= Eudora, Mississippi =

- Census-designated place
- Location within Mississippi
- Coordinates: 34°49′52″N 90°08′56″W
- Country: United States
- State: Mississippi
- County: Desoto

Area
  - Total: 4.01 sq mi (10.38 km^{2})
  - Land: 3.93 sq mi (10.19 km^{2})
  - Water: 0.073 sq mi (0.19 km^{2})
- Elevation: 305 ft (93 m)

Population (2020)
  - Total: 386
  - Density: 98.1/sq mi (37.89/km^{2})
- Time zone: UTC-6 (CST)
  - Summer (DST): UTC-5 (CDT)
- ZIP code: 38632 (Hernando)
- Area code: 662
- FIPS code: 28-23340
- GNIS feature ID: 2806370

Eudora is a census-designated place (CDP) and unincorporated community located in southwestern DeSoto County, Mississippi, United States, approximately 25 miles (40 km) south of Memphis, Tennessee. The intersection of Mississippi Highway 301 and old Mississippi Highway 304 has been the traditional heart of Eudora for decades.

The community has seen little growth in its history, unlike many other areas of Desoto County which have experienced tremendous development due to suburban sprawl from Memphis. The limited growth Eudora has seen, mostly new homes, likely results from its proximity to the casino district at Robinsonville, 10 miles (16 km) to the west. Also spurring interest in the area is the 2007 opening of the I-69 freeway which makes commuting to Memphis easier. Eudora is served by this new route with exits at Fogg Road and MS Hwy 301.

Per the 2020 Census, the population was 386.

== Demographics ==
Historical population
Census	Pop.	Note	%±
2020	386		—
U.S. Decennial Census; 2020

Eudora was first listed as a census designated place in the 2020 U.S. census.

=== 2020 census ===
Eudora CDP, Mississippi – Racial and ethnic composition Note: the US Census treats Hispanic/Latino as an ethnic category. This table excludes Latinos from the racial categories and assigns them to a separate category. Hispanics/Latinos may be of any race.
Race / Ethnicity (NH = Non-Hispanic)	Pop 2020	% 2020
White alone (NH)	341	88.34%
Black or African American alone (NH)	31	8.03%
Native American or Alaska Native alone (NH)	0	0.00%
Asian alone (NH)	0	0.00%
Native Hawaiian or Pacific Islander alone (NH)	0	0.00%
Other race alone (NH)	0	0.00%
Mixed race or Multiracial (NH)	9	2.33%
Hispanic or Latino (any race)	5	1.30%
Total	386	100.00%

== Attractions ==
- Camp Currier: A 650-acre (2.6 km^{2}) campground owned and operated by the Chickasaw Council of the Boy Scouts of America, serving scouts from all over the Memphis region.
- Arkabutla Lake: An 11,000-acre (45 km^{2}) reservoir built and managed by the U.S. Army Corps of Engineers. Popular with local fisherman, boaters and campers.
