= Mississippi Highway 302 =

Highway in Mississippi

Mississippi Highway 302
- Goodman Road

Route information
- Maintained by MDOT
- Length: 34.862 mi (56.105 km)
- Existed: 1984–present

Major junctions
- West end: MS 161 in Walls
- US 61 in Walls; US 51 in Horn Lake; I-55 / I-69 in Southaven; US 78 in Olive Branch; I-269 / MS 304 in Cayce
- East end: US 72 in Mount Pleasant

Location
- Country: United States
- State: Mississippi
- Counties: De Soto, Marshall

Highway system
- Mississippi State Highway System; Interstate; US; State
← MS 301	→ MS 304

Mississippi Highway 302 (MS 302), also known as Goodman Road, is the main east-west highway in DeSoto County, Mississippi, extending into Marshall County to the east. It runs approximately two miles (3.2 km) south of the Mississippi/Tennessee state line, from a western terminus at Mississippi Highway 161 (old U.S. Route 61 or US 61) in Walls to US 72 just west of Mount Pleasant.

== Route description ==
MS 302, along with Goodman Road, begins at the northern edge of the Mississippi Delta region in DeSoto County in the town of Walls at an intersection with MS 161. It heads due east as a four-lane divided highway to have an interchange with US 61 before leaving Walls, climbing out of the Delta, and narrowing to an undivided four-lane as it passes through the neighboring community of Lynchburg, where it has an intersection with MS 301. The highway now enters the city of Horn Lake and travels through suburban areas, as well as the city's main business district, before having an interchange with Interstate 55 (I-55) and I-69 (exit 289), where the highway crosses into neighboring Southaven. MS 302 travels a large business district, then suburbs, for a few miles before crossing into neighboring Olive Branch and having an interchange with US 78 (exit 2) and becoming an expressway. The highway immediately splits from Goodman Road as it bypasses downtown along its northern side, where it has a rather large interchange serving both MS 305 and MS 178, before rejoining Goodman Road to leave the city of Olive Branch, passing through the small community of Handy Corner before crossing into Marshall County.

MS 302 now travels through rural farmland for the next several miles as it passes through the communities of Barton, where it has an intersection with MS 309, and Cayce, where it has an interchange with I-269/MS 304 (exit 23), before coming to an end at an interchange with US 72 at the very western edge of the community of Mount Pleasant.

The entire length of Mississippi Highway 302 is at least four lanes wide.

== Major intersections ==
County	Location	mi	km	Destinations	Notes
DeSoto	Walls	0.0	0.0	MS 161 – Walls	Western terminus
DeSoto	Walls	0.2– 0.5	0.32– 0.80	US 61 – Memphis, Tunica	Interchange
DeSoto	Lynchburg	2.9	4.7	MS 301 – Memphis, Arkabutla, Arkabutla Lake	
DeSoto	Horn Lake	7.5	12.1	US 51 – Southaven, Hernando	
DeSoto	Southaven	8.3– 8.6	13.4– 13.8	I-55 / I-69 – Memphis, Jackson	I-55/I-69 exit 289
DeSoto	Olive Branch	16.6– 16.9	26.7– 27.2	US 78 – Memphis, Tupelo	US 78 exit 2
DeSoto	Olive Branch	17.2	27.7	Goodman Road - Downtown Olive Branch	Former MS 302 east
DeSoto	Olive Branch	17.5– 18.5	28.2– 29.8	MS 305 (Germantown Road / Cockrum Road) to MS 178 / Pigeon Roost Road – Downtown Olive Branch	Interchange
DeSoto	Olive Branch	20.0	32.2	Goodman Road - Downtown Olive Branch	Former MS 302 west
Marshall	Barton	26.3	42.3	MS 309 – Collierville, Byhalia	
Marshall	Cayce	28.9– 29.2	46.5– 47.0	I-269 / MS 304 – Tunica, Collierville	I-269 exit 23
Marshall	Cayce	30.4	48.9	Cayce Road – Cayce	
Marshall	Mount Pleasant	34.9	56.2	US 72 – Memphis, Corinth	Eastern terminus; interchange
1.000 mi = 1.609 km; 1.000 km = 0.621 mi
