= List of Interstate Highways in Tennessee =

Interstate Highways of the State Route System
- Highway markers for Interstate 40 and Interstate 840
- Interstate Highways highlighted in red

System information
- Maintained by TDOT
- Length: 1,233 mi (1,984 km)

Highway names
- Interstates: Interstate XX (I-XX)
- US Highways: U.S. Route XX (US XX)
- State: State Route XX (SR XX)

System links
- Tennessee State Routes; Interstate; US; State

The Interstate Highways in Tennessee are those parts of the Dwight D. Eisenhower National System of Interstate and Defense Highways owned and maintained by the Tennessee Department of Transportation (TDOT) the US state of Tennessee. Currently the state has 1,233 miles (1,984 km) of Interstate Highways. Tennessee's Interstate Highways are designated as the "Senator Albert Gore Sr. Memorial Interstate System" after a U.S. Senator from Tennessee who sponsored the Federal Aid Highway Act of 1956 that created the Interstate Highway System.

== Description ==
Tennessee contains a total of 1,233 miles (1,984 km) of Interstate Highways, all of which are maintained by the Tennessee Department of Transportation (TDOT). Tennessee's interstate system is designated as the "Senator Albert Gore Sr. Memorial Interstate System." Albert Gore Sr. was a three-term United States senator from Tennessee who co-sponsored the Federal Aid Highway Act of 1956, also known as the Interstate Highway Act.

The longest Interstate Highway in Tennessee is Interstate 40 (I-40), at a length of 454.81 miles (731.95 km). The segment of I-40 in Tennessee is also the longest segment of all of the states the route traverses. The shortest mainline Interstate Highway in Tennessee is I-55, at a length of 12.28 miles (19.76 km) in Memphis. The longest auxiliary Interstate Highway in Tennessee is I-840, an outer southern bypass around Nashville, at a length of 77.28 miles (124.37 km). The shortest Interstate Highway in Tennessee is the 1.97 miles (3.17 km) I-124 in Chattanooga, which is unsigned; the shortest signed Interstate Highway is I-275 in Knoxville, at 2.98 miles (4.80 km) long.

== History ==
Tennessee was allocated approximately 1,047.6 miles (1,685.9 km) of Interstate Highways by the Federal Aid Highway Act of 1956. I-24 was originally planned to run between Nashville and Chattanooga; it was approved to be extended to I-57 in southern Illinois in August 1964.

The first section of Interstate Highway in Tennessee was a short freeway in Knoxville, completed in two segments in 1952 and 1955, that was integrated into the Interstate Highway System, becoming part of I-40 and I-75. The first initial segment of Interstate Highway in Tennessee was a short portion of I-65 near the Alabama state line that opened on November 15, 1958.

The first section of Interstate to be complete between two major cities in Tennessee was I-40 between Memphis and Nashville, the last segment between these cities of which was dedicated on July 24, 1966. Most of I-40 between Nashville and Knoxville was also complete by this time. On December 20, 1974, the final segments of I-40, I-75, and I-81 in Tennessee opened to traffic, opening the final segments of mainline Interstate Highway initially allocated to Tennessee in 1956. At this time, however, work was not fully complete on these sections of I-81 and I-40; this occurred on August 27, 1975 and September 12, 1975, respectively. The last segment of I-24 in Tennessee, located west of Nashville, opened on January 5, 1978. The last segment of Interstate Highway in Tennessee to be completed that was planned by the Interstate Highway Act was on I-440 in Nashville, which opened on April 3, 1987.

Due to citizen opposition, a short segment of I-40 in Memphis planned to pass through the city's Overton Park was never built. Opposition began after the routing was proposed in the 1950s, and citizens waged a multi-year legal battle that culminated in the U.S. Supreme Court case Citizens to Preserve Overton Park v. Volpe in 1971. After this case, TDOT continued to explore options to construct this section until 1981, when it was abandoned, and a nearby section of I-240 was redesignated as part of I-40.

Since the completion of Tennessee's original Interstates, additional segments of highway in the state have been added to the system. An extension of I-26 into Tennessee was approved by AASHTO in 1988, and officially incorporated in August 2003. I-140 is a designation that was applied to a section of the Pellissippi Parkway in Knox and Blount counties that was constructed in the 1990s. I-840 was first proposed by the state legislature in 1986 and constructed between 1991 and 2012; it officially became an Interstate Highway on August 12, 2016. A segment of SR 385 in the Memphis area became I-269 in 2018.

An extension of I-69 into Tennessee was proposed in the 1990s. In 2005, I-3 was also proposed into Tennessee as a Third Infantry Division Highway.

== Primary Interstates ==
Number	Length (mi)	Length (km)	Southern or western terminus	Northern or eastern terminus	Formed	Removed	Notes
I-3	—	—	Georgia state line	Knoxville	—	—	Former proposal for the Third Infantry Division Highway
I-24	180.16	289.94	I-24 at Kentucky state line	I-75/US 74 in Chattanooga	1957	current	Noncontiguous; short segment extends into Georgia between both Tennessee segments.
I-26	54.5	87.7	US 11W/US 23 in Kingsport	I-26/US 23 at North Carolina state line	2003	current	
I-40	455.28	732.70	I-40 at Arkansas state line	I-40 at North Carolina state line	1957	current	
I-55	12.28	19.76	I-55/I-69 at Mississippi state line	I-55/US 61/US 64/US 70/US 78/US 79 at Arkansas state line	1957	current	
I-65	121.71	195.87	I-65/US 31 at Alabama state line	I-65 at Kentucky state line	1957	current	
I-69	—	—	I-55/I-69 at Mississippi state line	I-69/US 51 at Kentucky state line	proposed	—	Designation approved, but not adopted by TDOT, from Mississippi state line to I-40/SR 300
I-75	161.86	260.49	I-75 at Georgia state line	I-75 at Kentucky state line	1957	current	
I-81	75.66	121.76	I-40 in Dandridge	I-81 at Virginia state line	1957	current	
Proposed and unbuilt

Primary Interstates

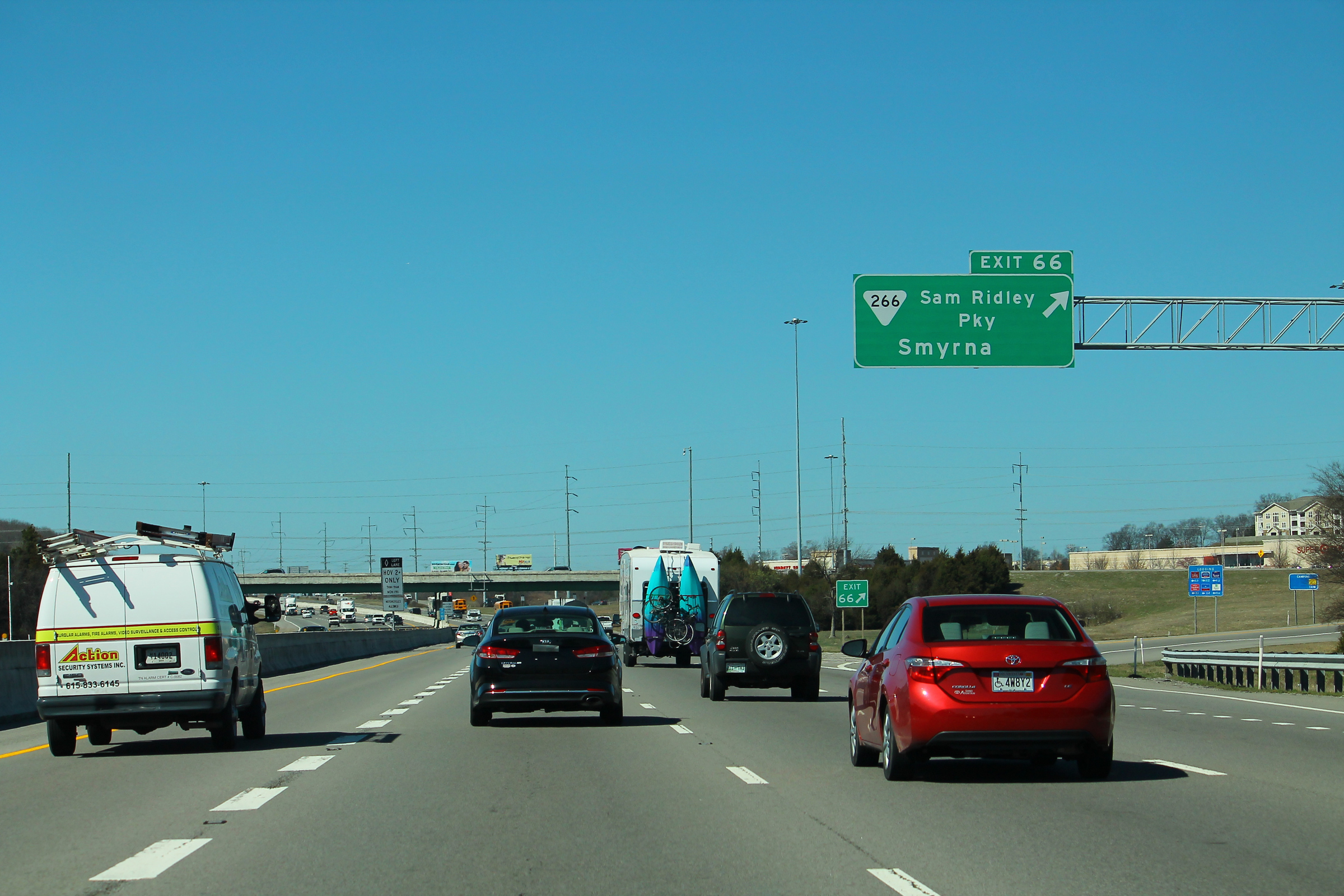
I-24 in Smyrna, a suburb of Nashville

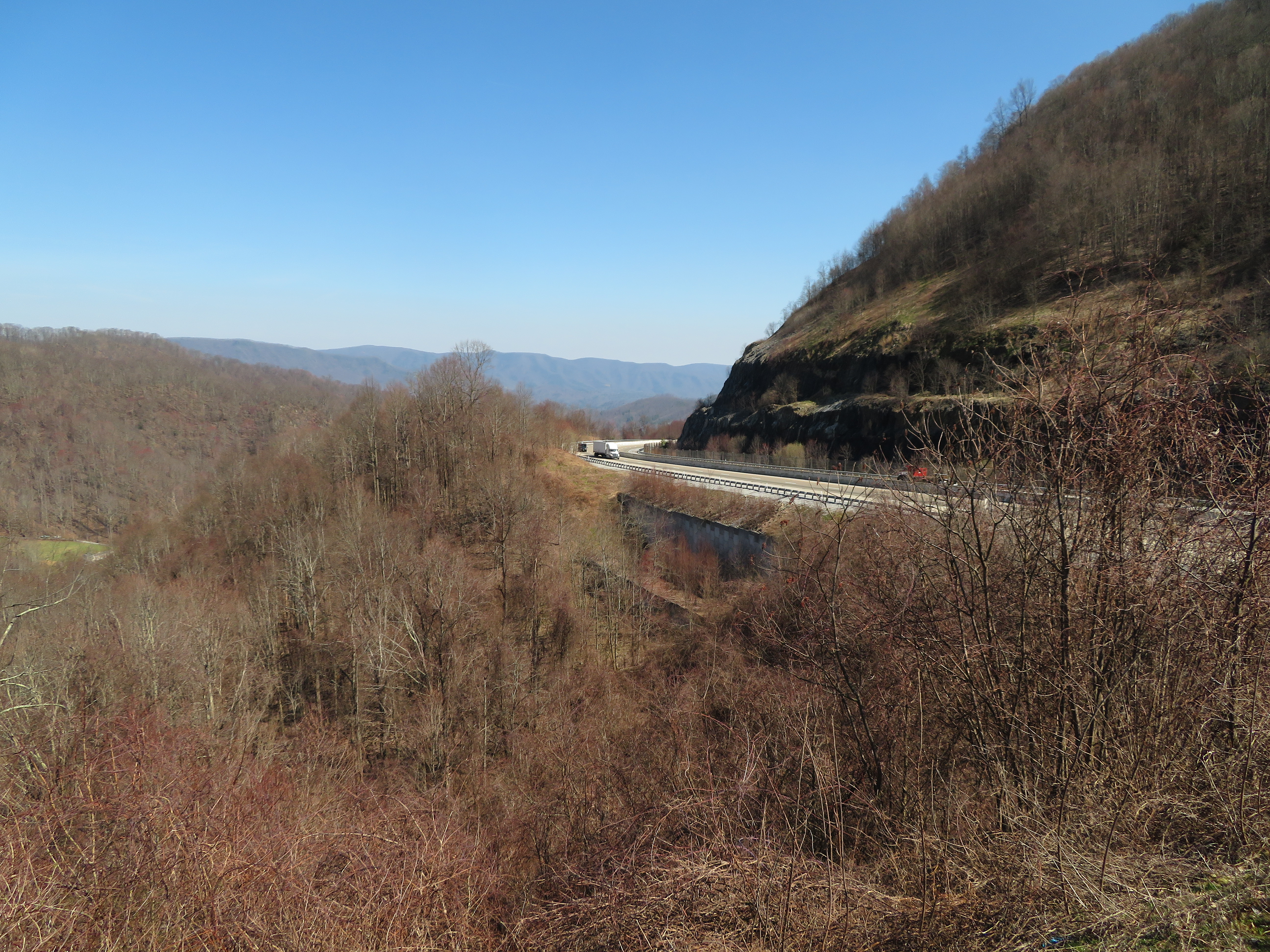
I-26 in the Bald Mountains

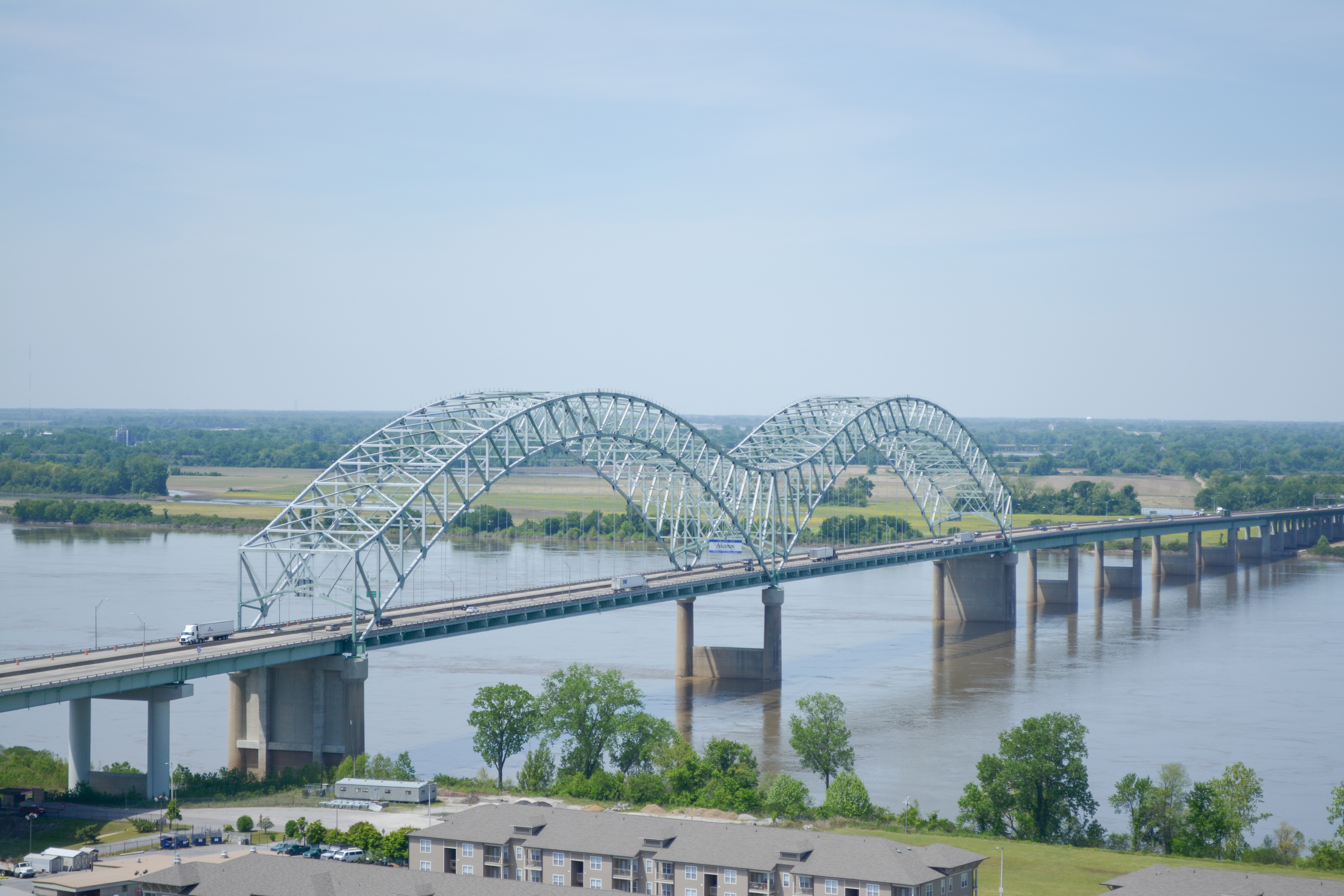
The Hernando de Soto Bridge, which carries I-40 across the Mississippi River between Memphis and West Memphis, Arkansas

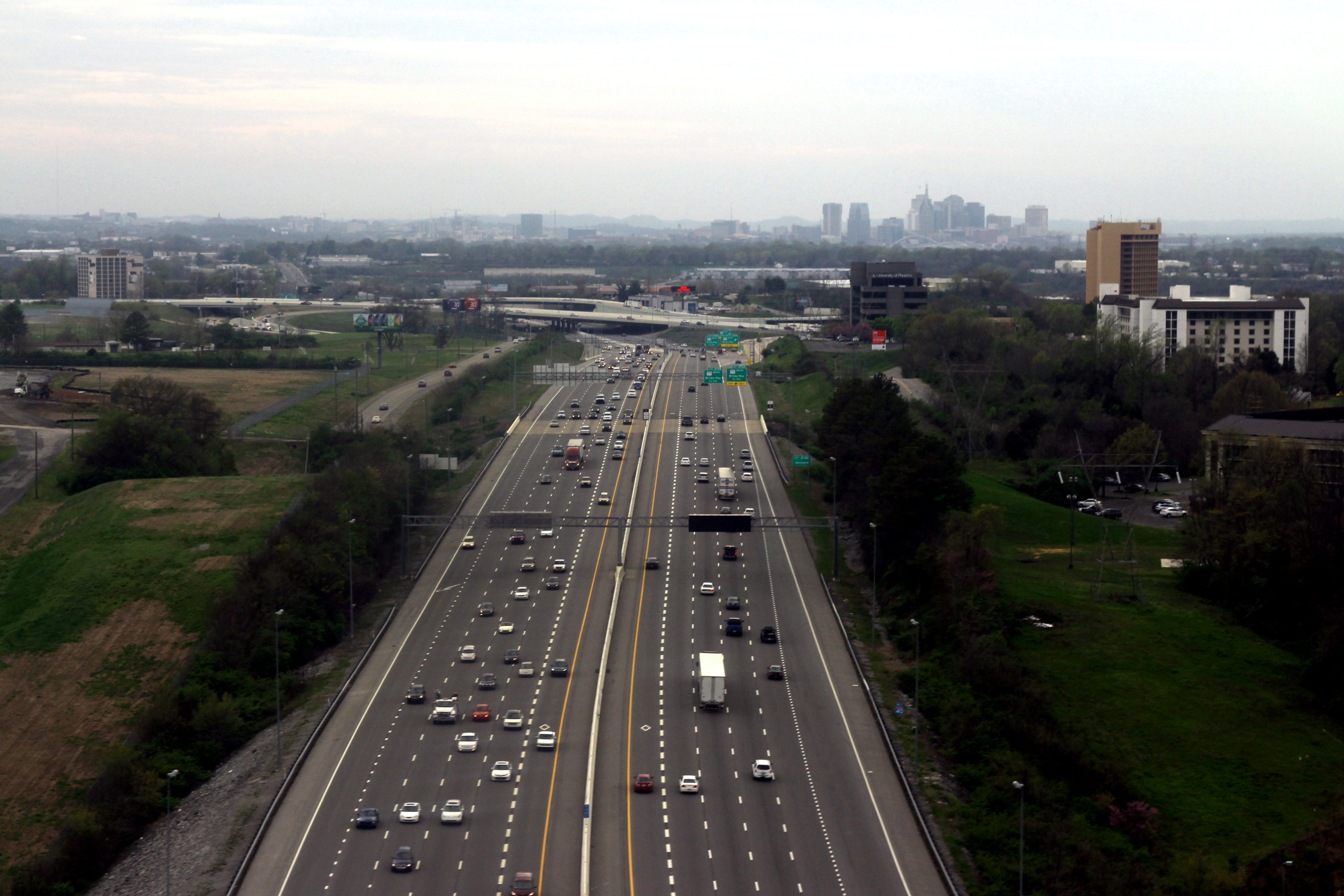
I-40 near the Nashville International Airport

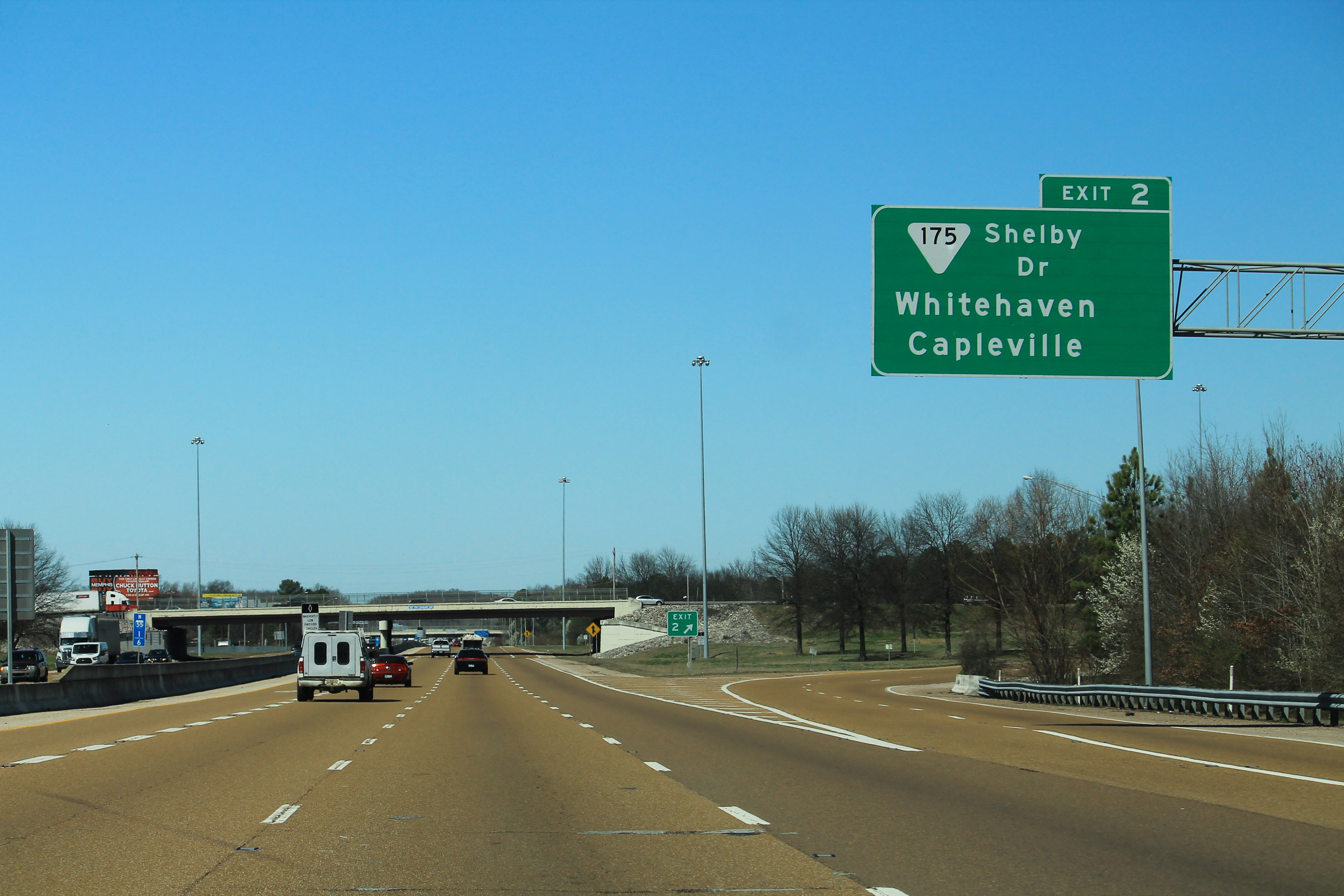
I-55 near exit 2

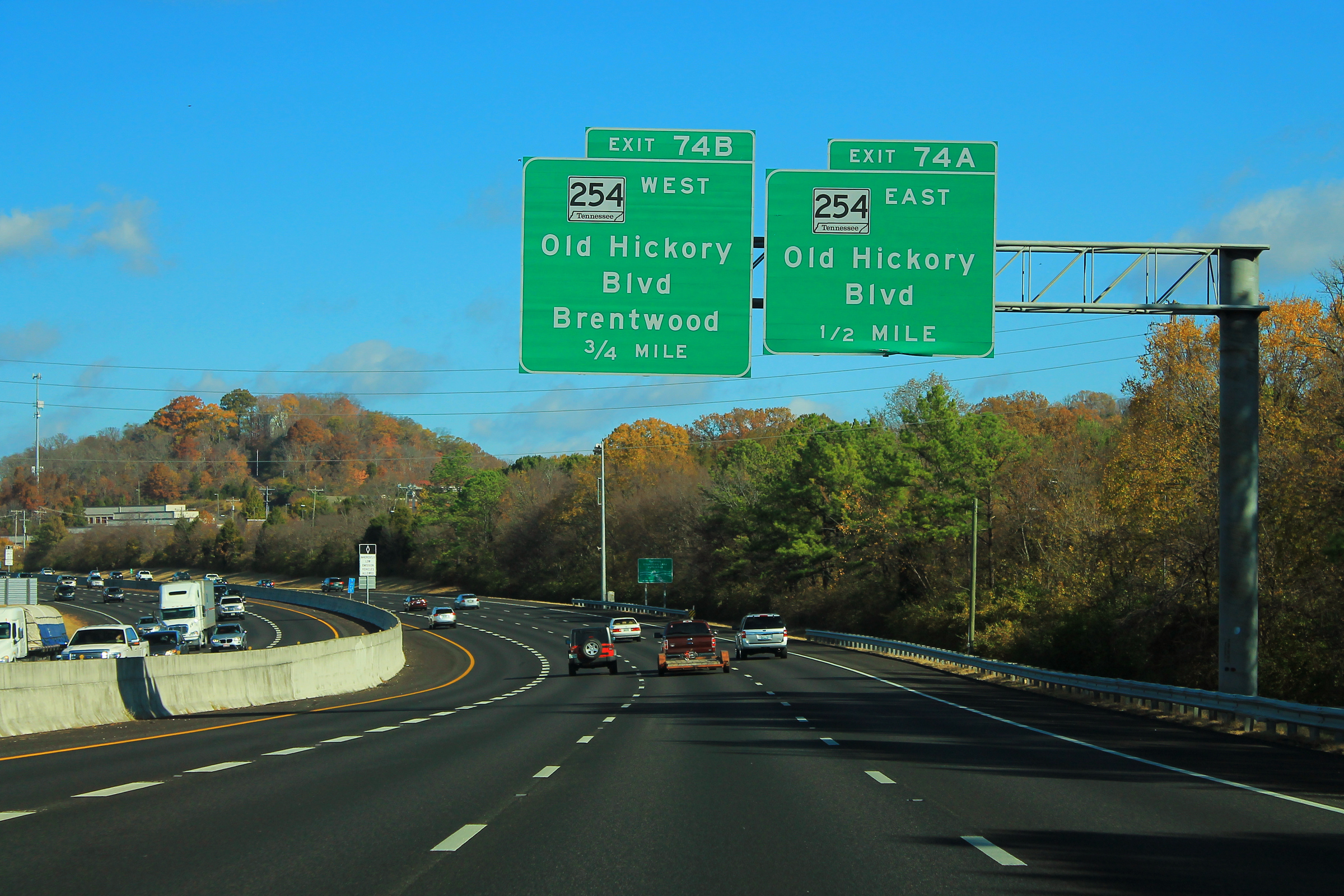
I-65 in Brentwood, a suburb of Nashville

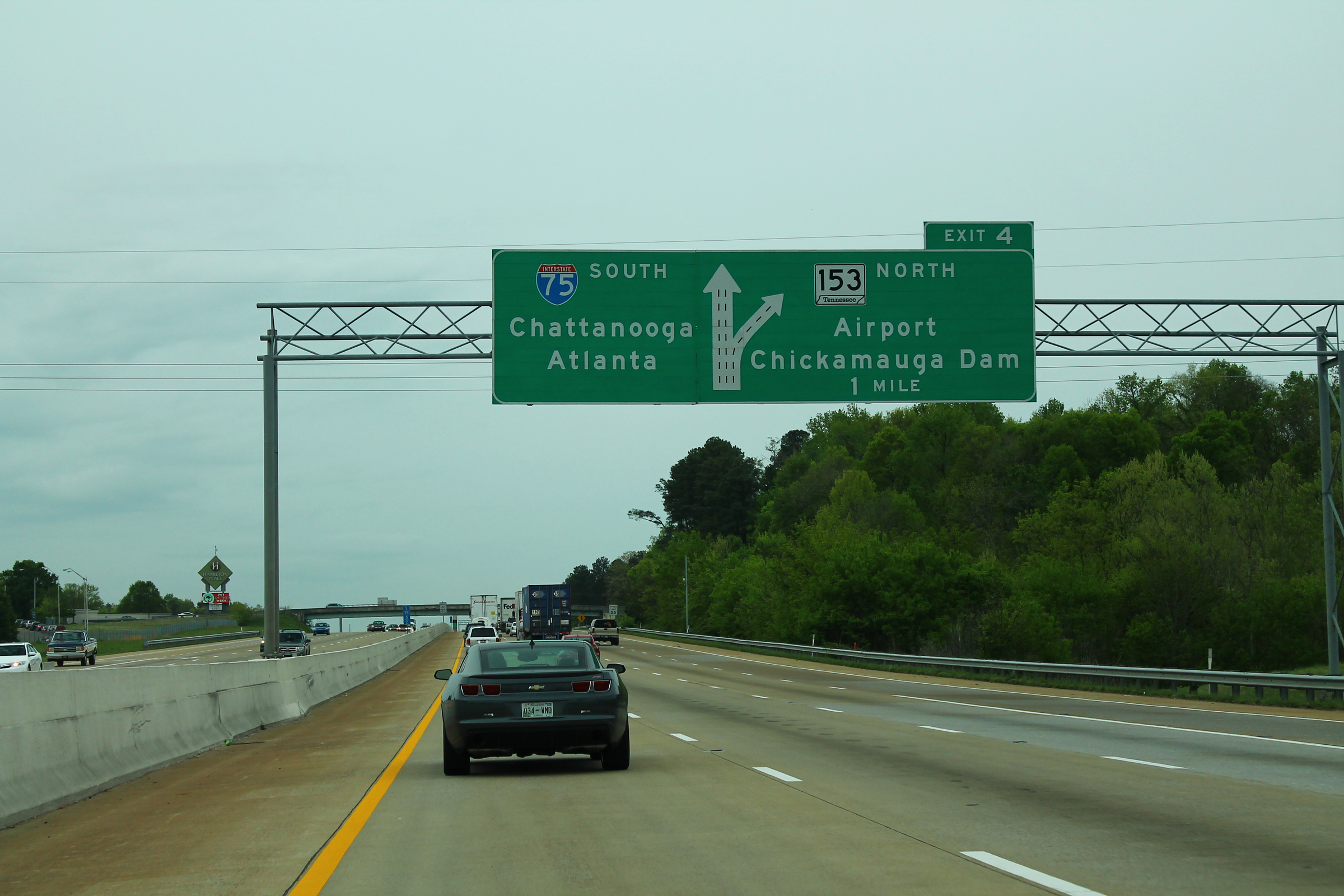
I-75 in Chattanooga

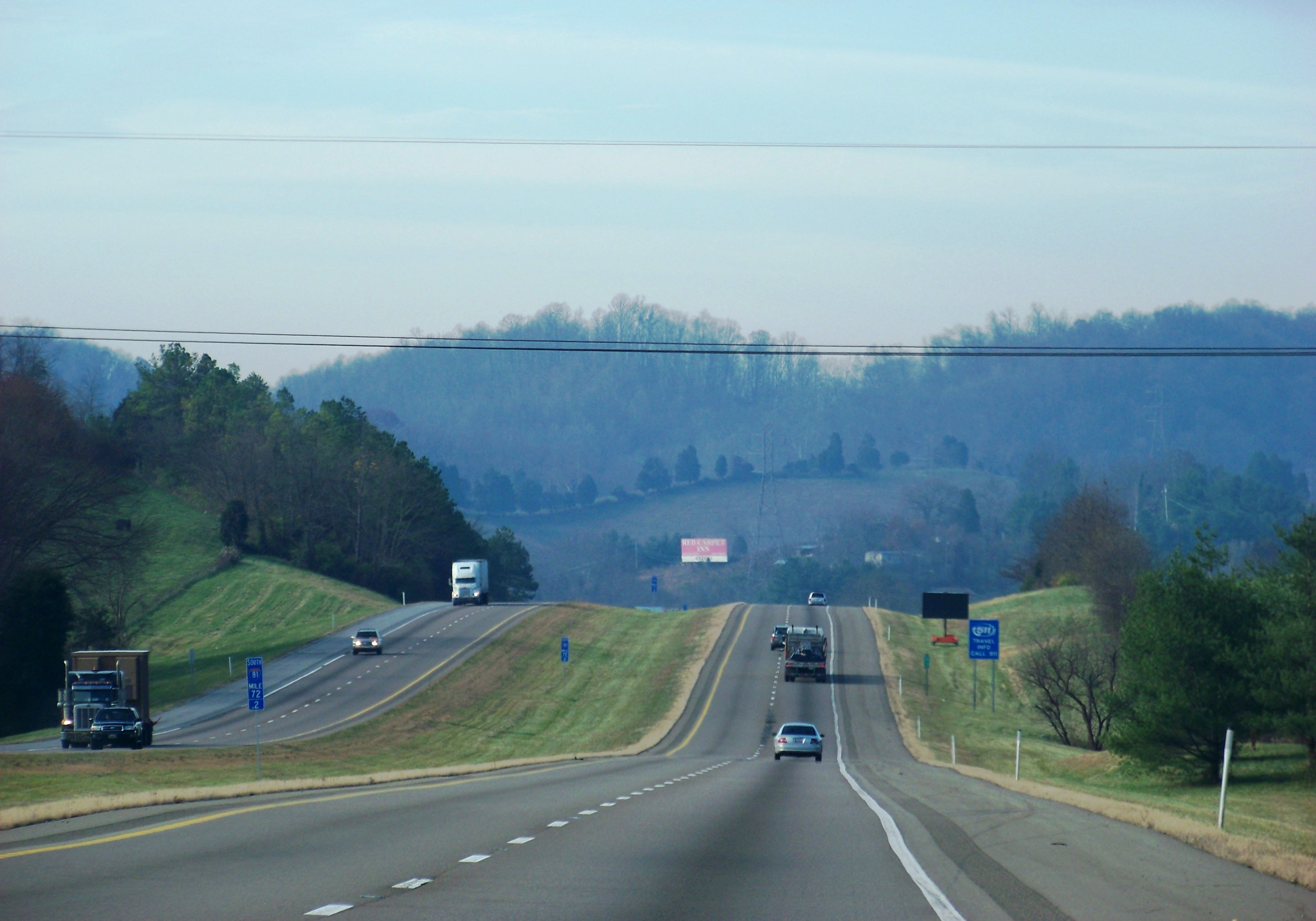
I-81 near Bristol

== Auxiliary Interstates ==
Number	Length (mi)	Length (km)	Southern or western terminus	Northern or eastern terminus	Formed	Removed	Notes
I-124	1.97	3.17	I-24 in Chattanooga	US 27 in Chattanooga	1958	current	Unsigned designation
I-140	11.18	17.99	SR 162 in Knoxville	US 129/SR 162 in Alcoa	1992	current	
I-155	15.93	25.64	I-155/US 412 at Missouri state line	US 51/US 412 in Dyersburg	1964	current	
I-169	—	—	I-69 / US 51 in Union City	SR 22 / SR 43 / US 45E in Martin	—	—	Will be renumbering the freeway portion of SR 22
I-181	15.93	25.64	US 19W/US 23/US 321 in Johnson City	US 11W/US 23 in Kingsport	1985	2007	Replaced by I-26
I-240	19.27	31.01	I-40 in Memphis	I-40 in Memphis	1958	current	Entire loop at one time proposed to be I-240. Northern side of loop designated as I-40 upon completion, due to abandonment of plans to build I-40 through Overton Park.
I-255	5.38	8.66	I-55/I-240 in Memphis	I-40/I-240 in Memphis	1958	1973	Original designation of I-240 between western I-40 interchange and I-55
I-265	2.41	3.88	I-24/I-65 in Nashville	—	1958	2000	Replaced by I-65
I-269	19	31	I-269 at Mississippi state line	I-40/SR 385 in Arlington	2015	current	Will replace SR 385 between Arlington and Millington in future.
I-275	2.98	4.80	I-40/US 441 in Knoxville	I-75/I-640/US 25W in Knoxville	1980	current	Original alignment of I-75 between I-40 and I-75/I-640
I-440	7.64	12.30	I-40 in Nashville	I-24 in Nashville	1958	current	
I-475	—	—	I-40/I-75 near Lenoir City	I-75 near Heiskell	1995	2010	Proposed I-75 bypass of Knoxville, also proposed to be extended to I-40 at exit 407 (SR 66) to provide a complete northern beltway of Knoxville and provide a more direct route to Sevier County/Great Smoky Mountains National Park
I-640	10.1	16.3	I-40/I-75 in Knoxville	I-40/US 25W in Knoxville	1958	current	
I-840	77.28	124.37	I-40 near Dickson	I-40 near Lebanon	2016	current	Redesignated from SR 840, the Nashville Southern Beltway.
Former; Proposed and unbuilt

Auxiliary Interstates

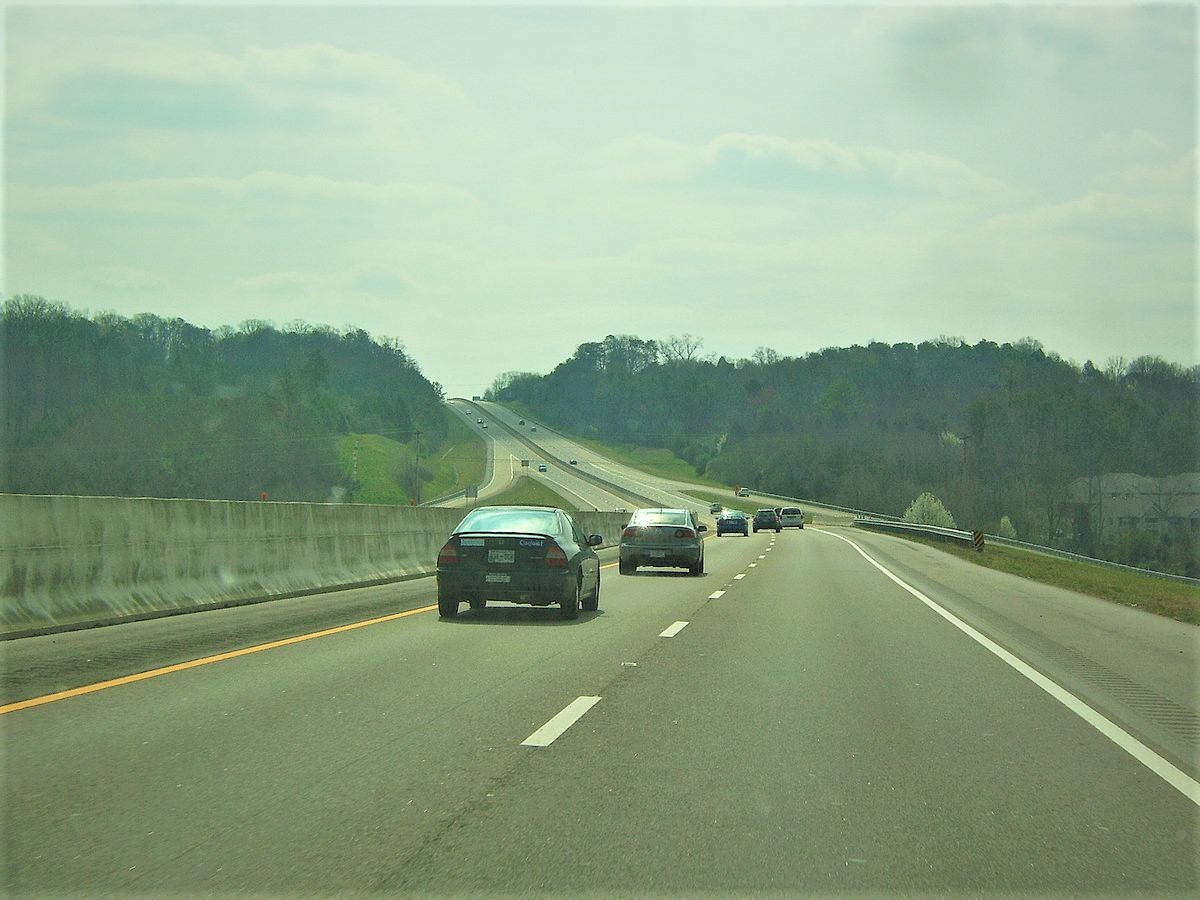
The Pellissippi Parkway (I-140) in West Knoxville

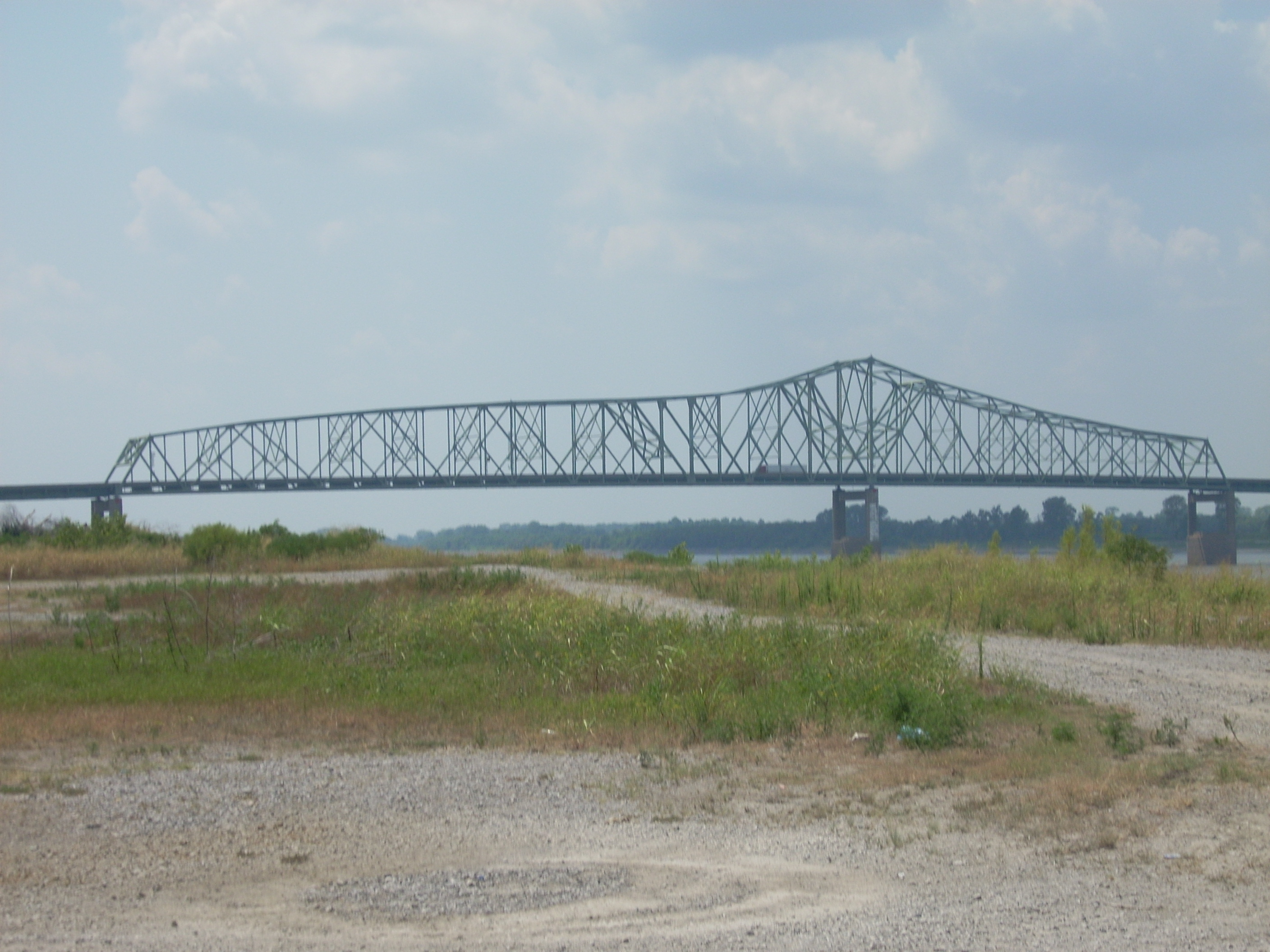
The Caruthersville Bridge carries I-155 across the Mississippi River

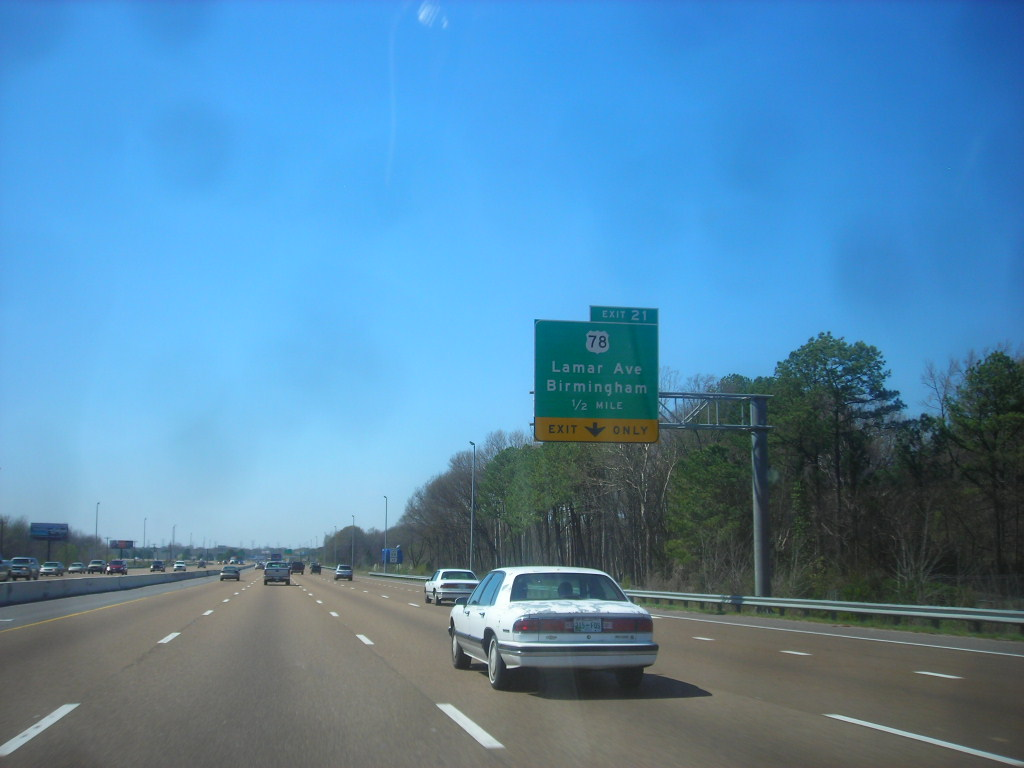
I-240 near US 78

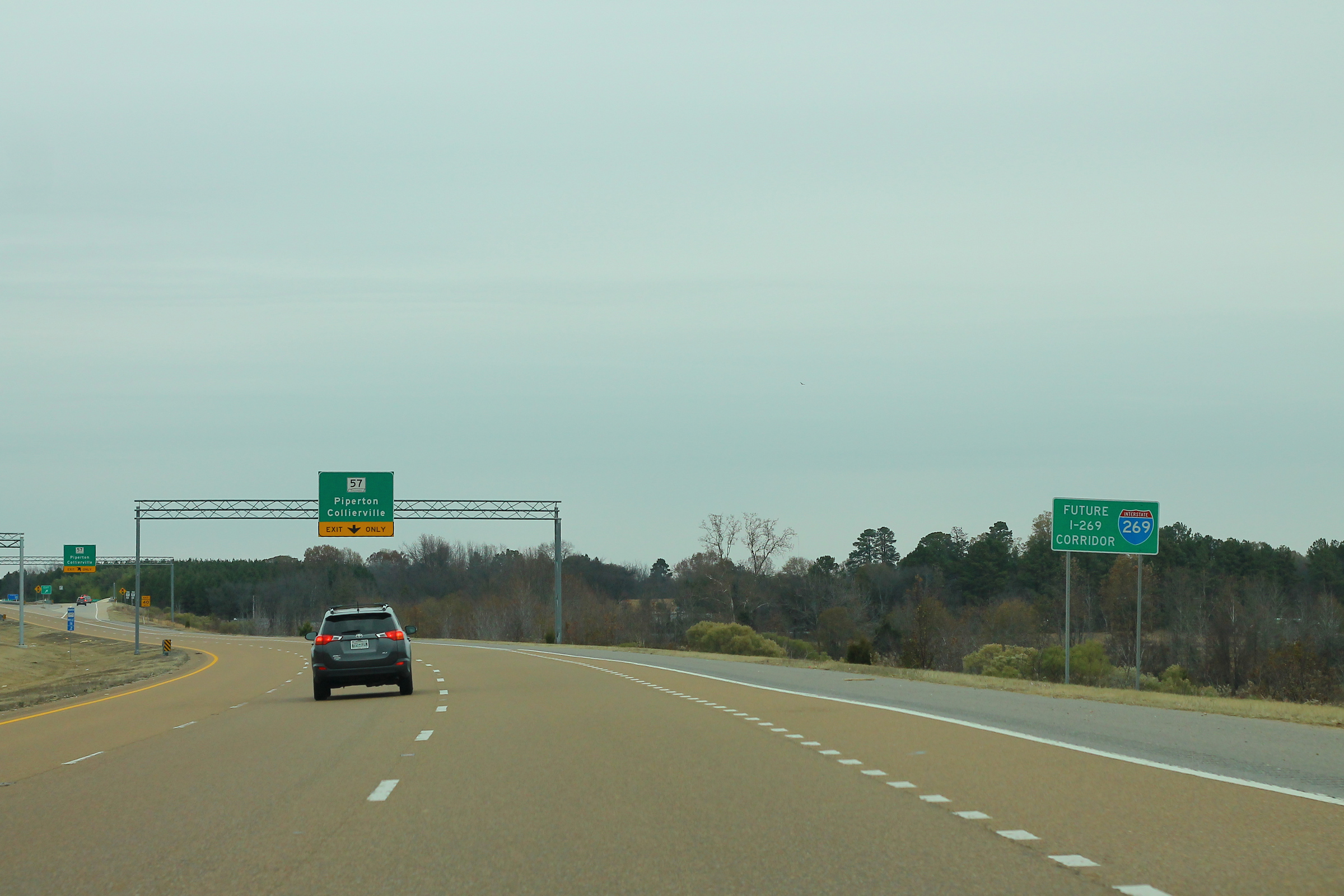
I-269 in 2016, displaying a "Future I-269 Corridor" sign

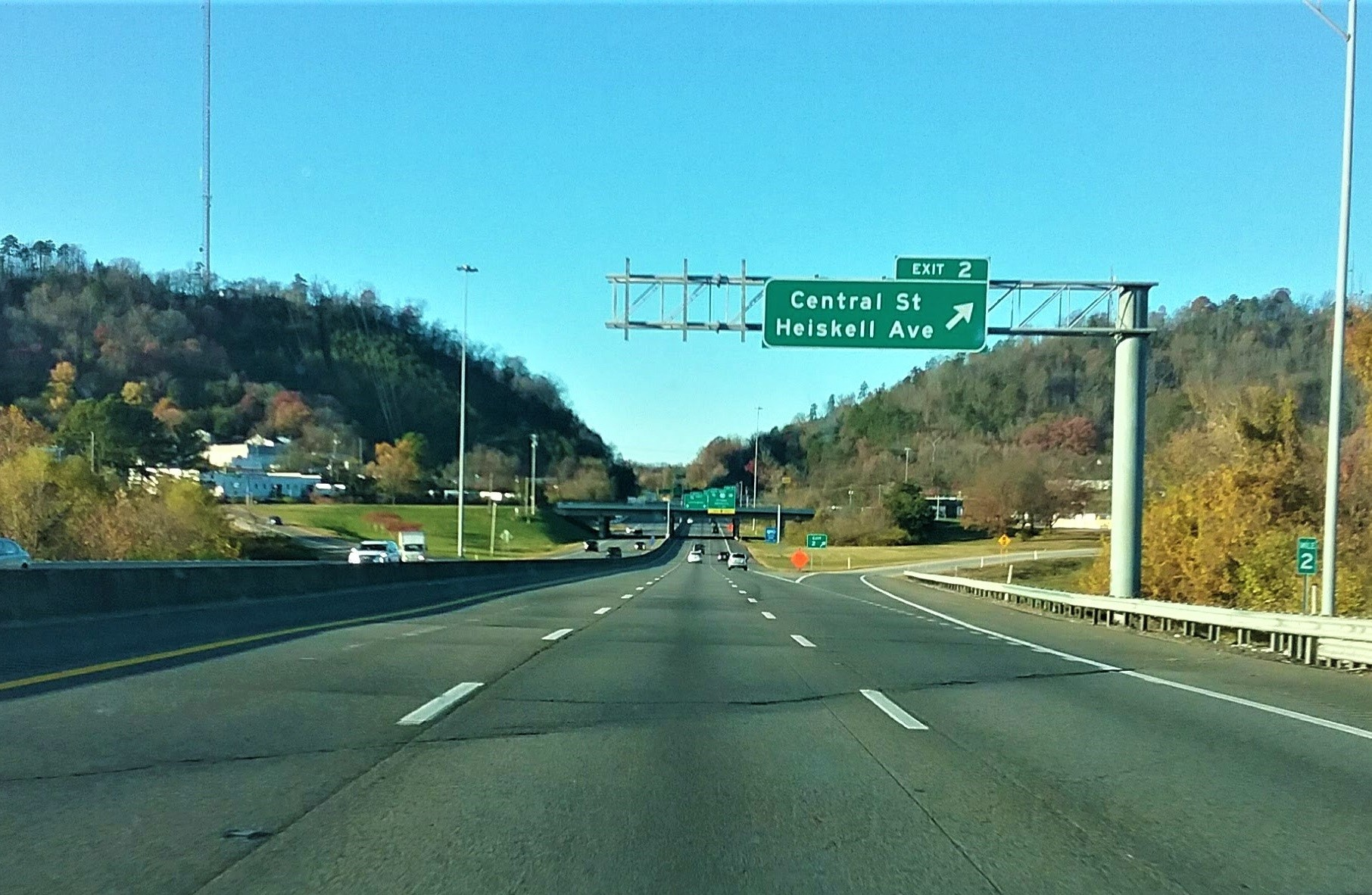
I-275 approaching Sharps Gap

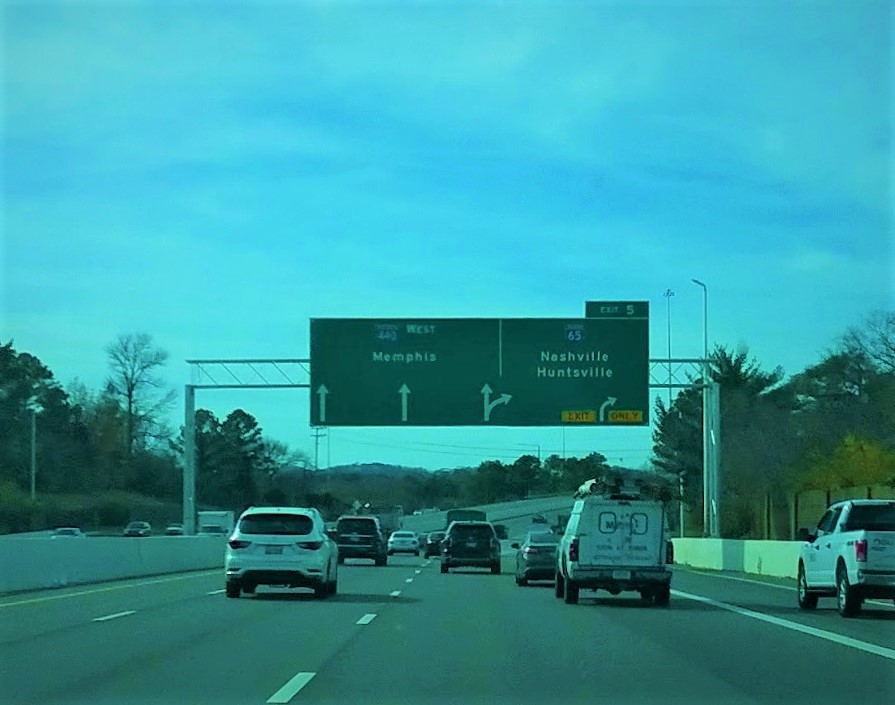
I-440 westbound near the junction with I-65

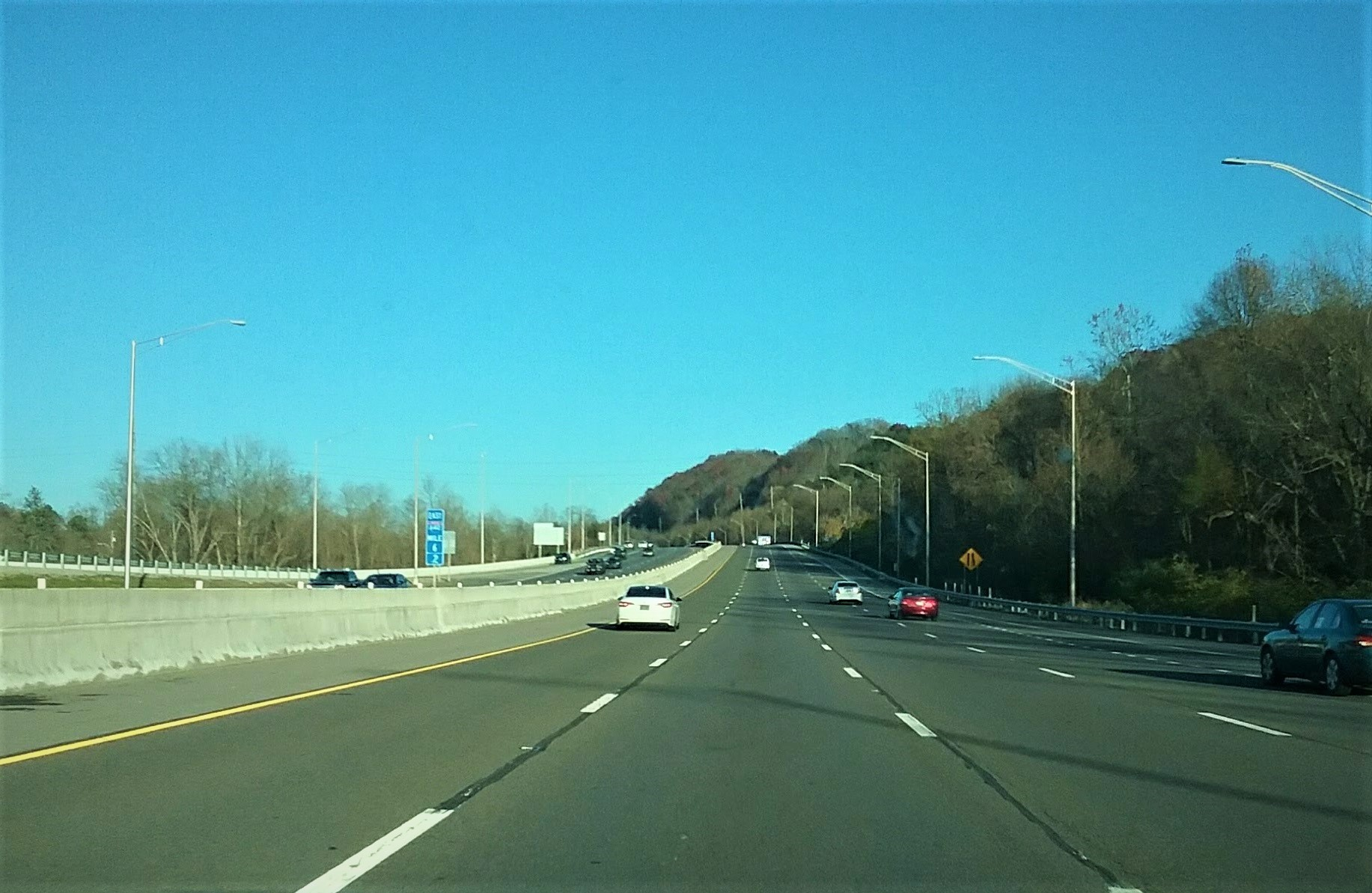
I-640 north of Downtown Knoxville

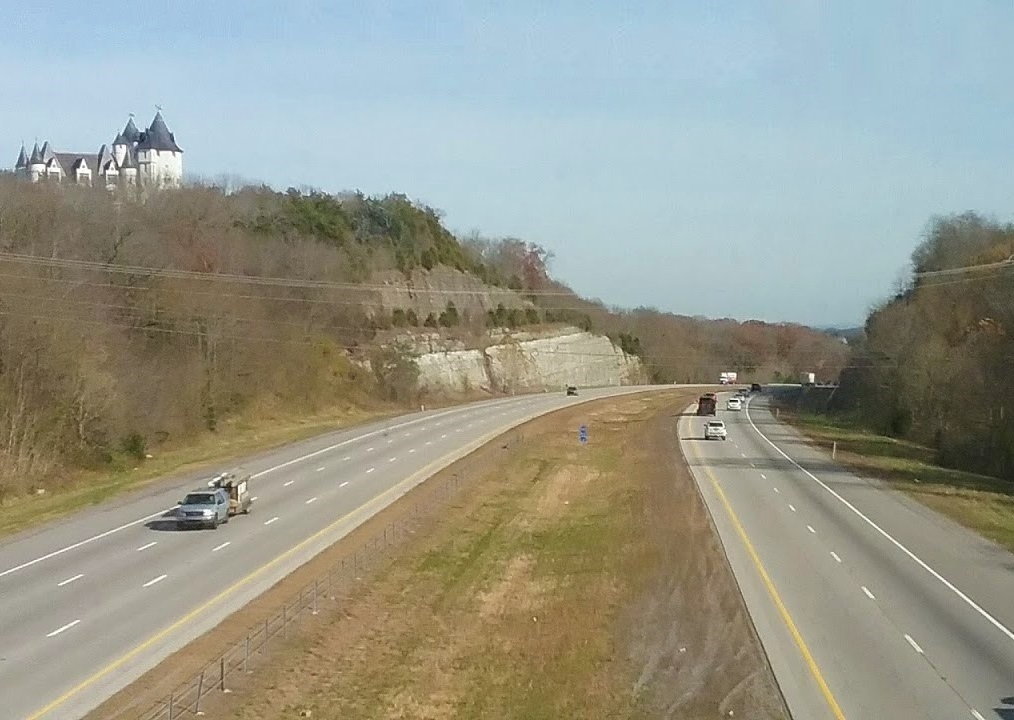
I-840 near the Williamson–Rutherford county line
