= Mississippi Highway 301 =

State Highway in Northwest Mississippi

Mississippi Highway 301

Route information
- Length: 23.336 mi (37.556 km)
- Existed: 1950–present

Major junctions
- South end: MS 304 Scenic near Arkabutla
- I-69 / MS 304 near Eudora; MS 302 in Lynchburg
- North end: SR 175 at the Tennessee state line near Memphis

Location
- Country: United States
- State: Mississippi
- Counties: Tate, DeSoto

Highway system
- Mississippi State Highway System; Interstate; US; State
← US 278	→ MS 302

Mississippi Highway 301 (MS 301) is a north-south state highway in northwestern Mississippi. It runs from the community of Arkabutla in Tate County, north across Arkabutla Dam, to the Tennessee border in DeSoto County, where it continues as Tennessee State Route 175 (SR 175 / Weaver Road).

== Route description ==
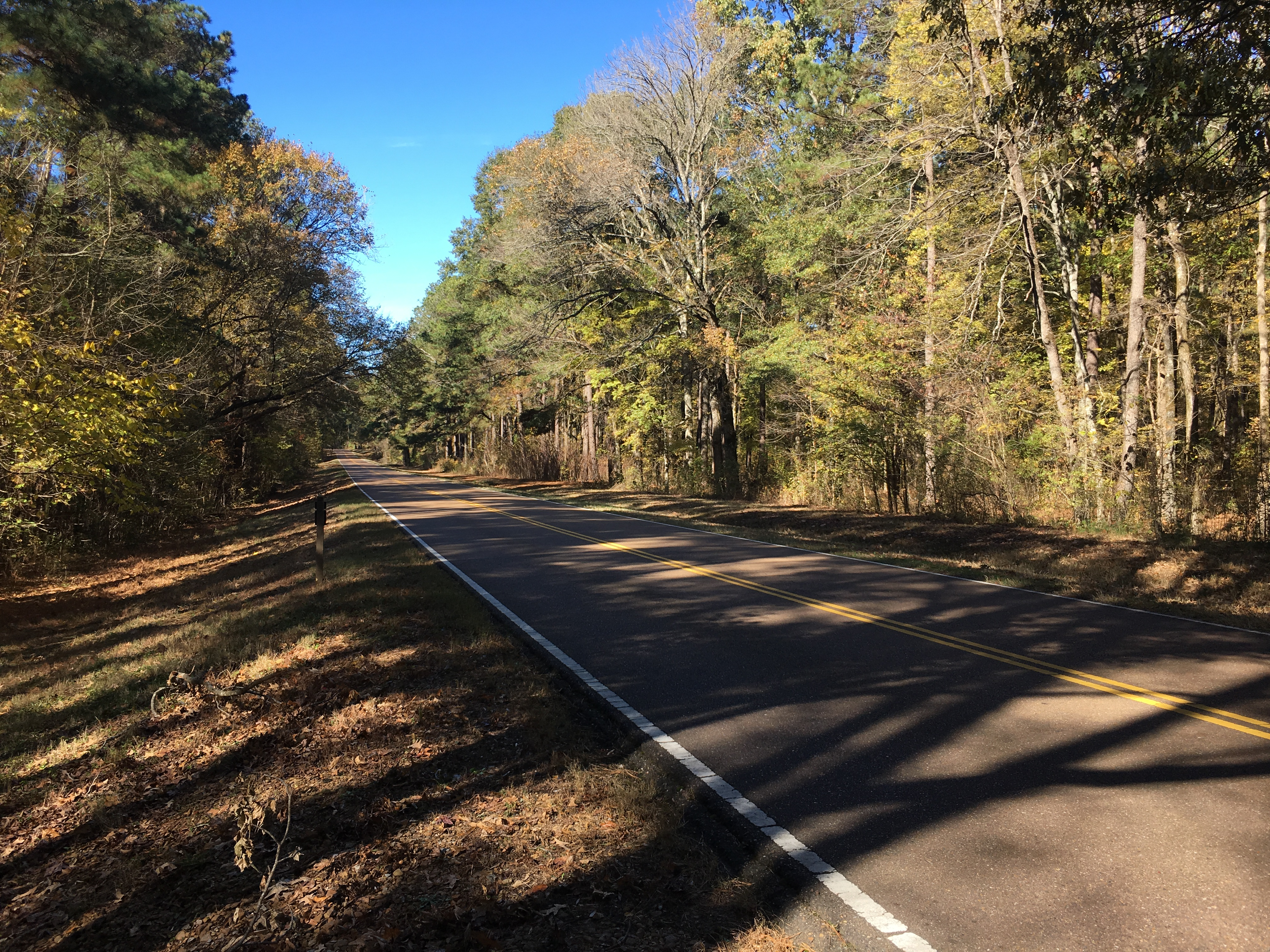
Mississippi Highway 301 near Arkabutla Lake

In Tate County, MS 301 begins at an intersection between Arkabutla Road and MS 304 Scenic in the community of Arkabutla. It travels northward, concurrent with MS 304 Scenic, through farmland to leave the community and wind its way through hilly woodlands for a few miles to pass along the shores of Sunfish Bay (part of Arkabutla Lake). The highway now passes along the western side of the Arkabutla Dam, where it crosses a bridge over the Coldwater River into DeSoto County. Officially, the MS 301 designation is discontinued across the foot of the dam but no signage for MS 301 appears along the road south of the dam.

MS 301/MS 304 Scenic now leaves the Dam area as they turn left onto Pratt Road and head west. They then cross Cub Lake Bayou before making a right turn and heading north again. They pass through the community of Eudora, where the road intersects the former alignment of MS 304. The concurrency with MS 304 ends as it travels eastward at the intersection. At this point, signage for MS 301 begins and the highway becomes maintained by the state after having been locally maintained to the south. MS 301 has an intersection with Green River Road, the route meets current MS 304 and Interstate 69 (I-69) at a diamond interchange (unnumbered exit). Past the interchange, MS 301 turns northeastward and it passes through the community of West Days at Days Road. At the intersection with Church Road, MS 301 widens to 5 lanes. The route intersects MS 302 in Lynchburg and continues northwards to the state line. MS 301 ends at the state line, and Tennessee State Route 175 (SR 175) continues past that point into the city of Memphis.

== Major intersections ==
County	Location	mi	km	Destinations	Notes
Tate	Arkabutla	0.0	0.0	MS 304 Scenic east to I-55 / US 51 – Coldwater Arkabutla Road to MS 3 – Savage	Southern terminus; southern end of MS 304 Scenic concurrency
Desoto	Eudora	10.1	16.3	MS 304 Scenic west to I-55 / US 51 – Hernando Old Highway 304 to MS 713 / US 61 – Tunica Resorts	northern end of MS 304 Scenic concurrency; former MS 304
Desoto		12.8	20.6	I-69 / MS 304 – Tunica, Collierville	Diamond interchange
Desoto	Lynchburg	21.0	33.8	MS 302 (Goodman Road) – Walls, Horn Lake	
Desoto	Barnesville	23.2	37.3	SR 175 east (Weaver Road) – Memphis	Northern terminus; Tennessee state line
1.000 mi = 1.609 km; 1.000 km = 0.621 mi: Concurrency terminus
