= Mississippi Highway 304 =

Highway in Mississippi

Mississippi Highway 304
- MS 304 in red, MS 304 Scenic in blue

Route information
- Maintained by MDOT
- Length: 40.387 mi (64.997 km)
- Existed: 1950–present

Major junctions
- West end: US 61 near Lake Cormorant
- I-69 / MS 713 in Banks; I-55 / I-69 in Hernando; I-22 / US 78 in Byhalia
- East end: I-269 at the Tennessee state line near Collierville, TN

Location
- Country: United States
- State: Mississippi
- Counties: DeSoto, Marshall

Highway system
- Mississippi State Highway System; Interstate; US; State
| ← MS 302 | → MS 305 |

Mississippi Highway 304 (MS 304) is an east-west state highway in the northwestern part of the U.S. state of Mississippi, running for 40.4 miles (65.0 km) as a four-lane freeway from U.S. Route 61 (US 61) in Tunica Resorts to the Tennessee state line near Collierville. It is mostly concurrent with Interstate 69 (I-69) and Interstate 269 (I-269).

== Route description ==
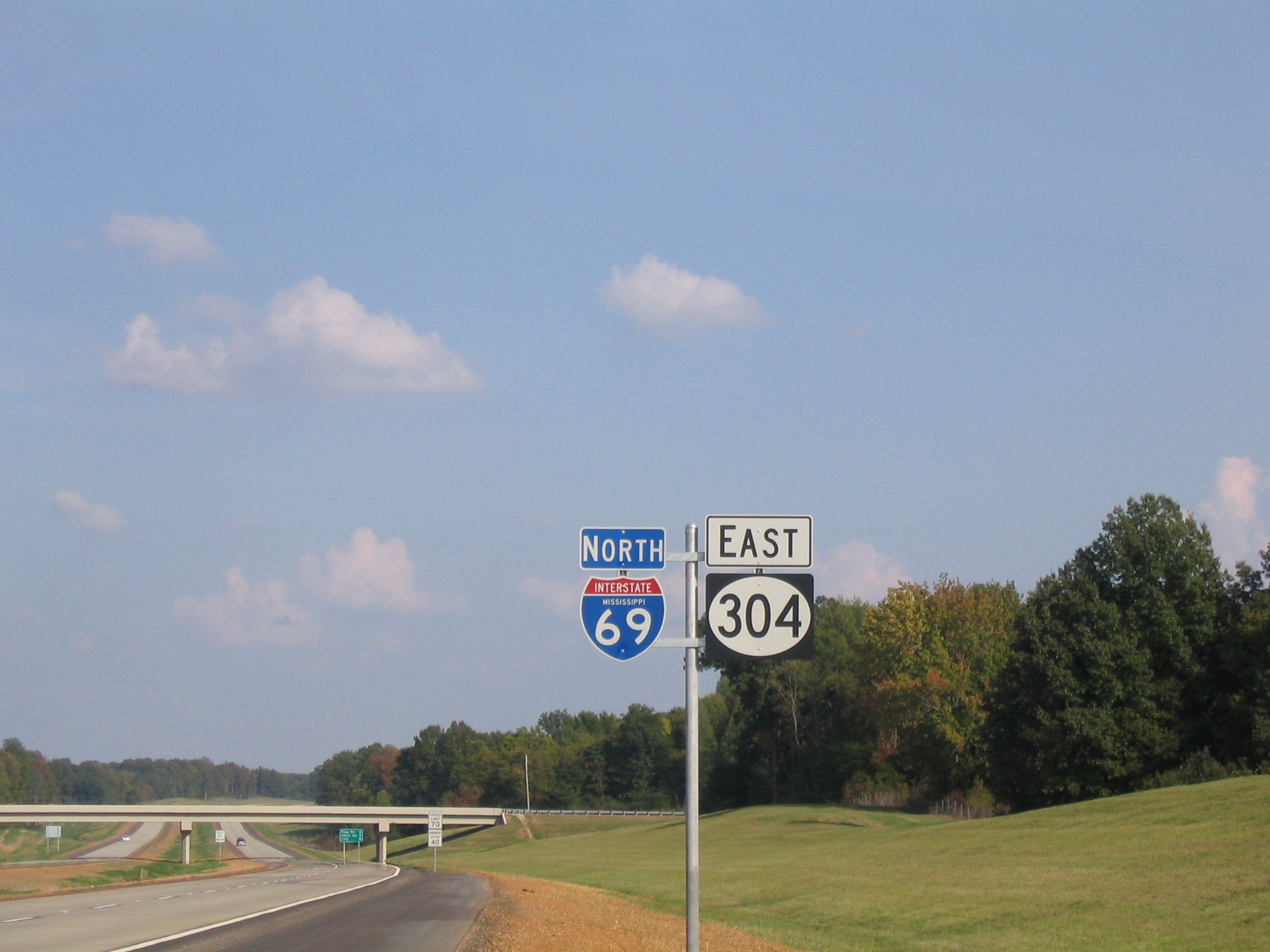
I-69 north/MS 304 east near the MS 301 interchange

MS 304 begins at a trumpet interchange with US 61 east of Tunica Resorts in the northern reaches of the Mississippi Delta region. The four-lane freeway has a half-diamond interchange with MS 3 that allows access to and from the east. MS 304 crosses over a rail line and has a partial interchange with a stub of I-69 that leads to MS 713 at Banks; the interchange includes a flyover from the westbound direction of the freeway. Immediately to the east of the interchange, I-69/MS 304 climbs some Loess bluffs to leave the Delta. The freeway has diamond interchanges with MS 301, Fogg Road, and Tulane Road. I-69/MS 304 crosses another rail line and passes over US 51 with no access just west of the state highway's terminus at I-55 on the northern end of Hernando, where I-69 joins I-55 heading north toward Memphis. The highways meet at a full cloverleaf interchange and then MS 304 runs east concurrent with Interstate 269 to the Tennessee state line.

== History ==
MS 304 was originally designated back in 1950 along a narrow, rural, two-lane highway running from US 61 in what was then known as Robinsonville (now Tunica Resorts) to I-55 in Hernando, in Tunica and De Soto counties respectively. Portions of this highway are still state maintained, including the new MS 713 (from Tunica Resorts to Banks) and MS 304 Scenic (from Eudora to Hernando). The portion in between (from Banks to Eudora) still exists and is county maintained, simply known as Old Highway 304.

The Mississippi Highway 304 Relocation project, completed in 2006, and extended in 2018, was a construction project that completely relocated the entire route of MS 304 onto a four-lane divided freeway, meant to connect the Tunica Resorts casino area to I-55. The I-69 designation was added to the project in 2000, with construction on the original portion (US 61 to I-55) being completed in 2006. When I-269 was given Federal approval in 2007, MS 304 was added to that project. When the Mississippi portion of I-269 was completed 2018, MS 304 was co-signed along the entire length of the Mississippi portion of I-269.

== Exit list ==
| County | Location | mi | km | Exit | Destinations | Notes |
|---|---|---|---|---|---|---|
| DeSoto | | 0.0 | 0.0 | | US 61 – Tunica, Memphis | Western terminus |
| DeSoto | | 0.9 | 1.4 | | MS 3 | Westbound exit and eastbound entrance |
| DeSoto | | 2.9– 3.2 | 4.7– 5.1 | | I-69 south / MS 713 south – Tunica | Westbound exit and eastbound entrance; western end of I-69 concurrency: northern terminus of MS 713 |
| DeSoto | | 4.9– 5.5 | 7.9– 8.9 | | MS 301 | |
| DeSoto | | 8.9– 9.4 | 14.3– 15.1 | | Fogg Road | |
| DeSoto | | 10.9– 11.5 | 17.5– 18.5 | | Tulane Road | |
| DeSoto | Hernando | 13.8– 14.7 | 22.2– 23.7 | | I-55 / I-69 north – Memphis, Southaven, Jackson I-269 begins | Eastern end of I-69 concurrency; southern terminus of I-269; exits 283A-B on I-55 |
| DeSoto | | 15.1– 15.8 | 24.3– 25.4 | 1 | McIngvale Road | Opened to traffic on October 13, 2021 |
| DeSoto | | 17.1– 17.8 | 27.5– 28.6 | 3 | Getwell Road | |
| DeSoto | | 19.2– 19.8 | 30.9– 31.9 | 5 | Laughter Road | |
| DeSoto | | 21.3– 22.0 | 34.3– 35.4 | 7 | Craft Road | |
| DeSoto | | 23.4– 24.0 | 37.7– 38.6 | 9 | MS 305 – Olive Branch, Independence | |
| DeSoto | | 27.4– 28.0 | 44.1– 45.1 | 13 | Red Banks Road | |
| DeSoto | Byhalia | 29.1– 30.8 | 46.8– 49.6 | 16 | I-22 east / US 78 – Holly Springs, Tupelo, Birmingham, Olive Branch, Memphis | Signed as exits 16A (east) and 16B (west); western terminus of I-22; exit 12 on I-22/US 78 |
| Marshall | | 31.9– 32.5 | 51.3– 52.3 | 18 | MS 309 – Byhalia | |
| Marshall | Cayce | 37.6– 38.4 | 60.5– 61.8 | 23 | MS 302 – Southaven, Olive Branch | |
| Marshall | | 40.4 | 65.0 | | I-269 north – Collierville | Continuation into Tennessee; eastern end of I-269 concurrency |
1.000 mi = 1.609 km; 1.000 km = 0.621 mi: Concurrency terminus; Incomplete access

== Scenic route ==
Mississippi Highway 304 Scenic
- Location: Coldwater - Hernando
- Length: 31.4 mi (50.5 km)

Mississippi Highway 304 Scenic (MS 304 Scenic) is a scenic route of MS 304, connecting the towns of Coldwater and Hernando with Arkabutla Dam and Lake.

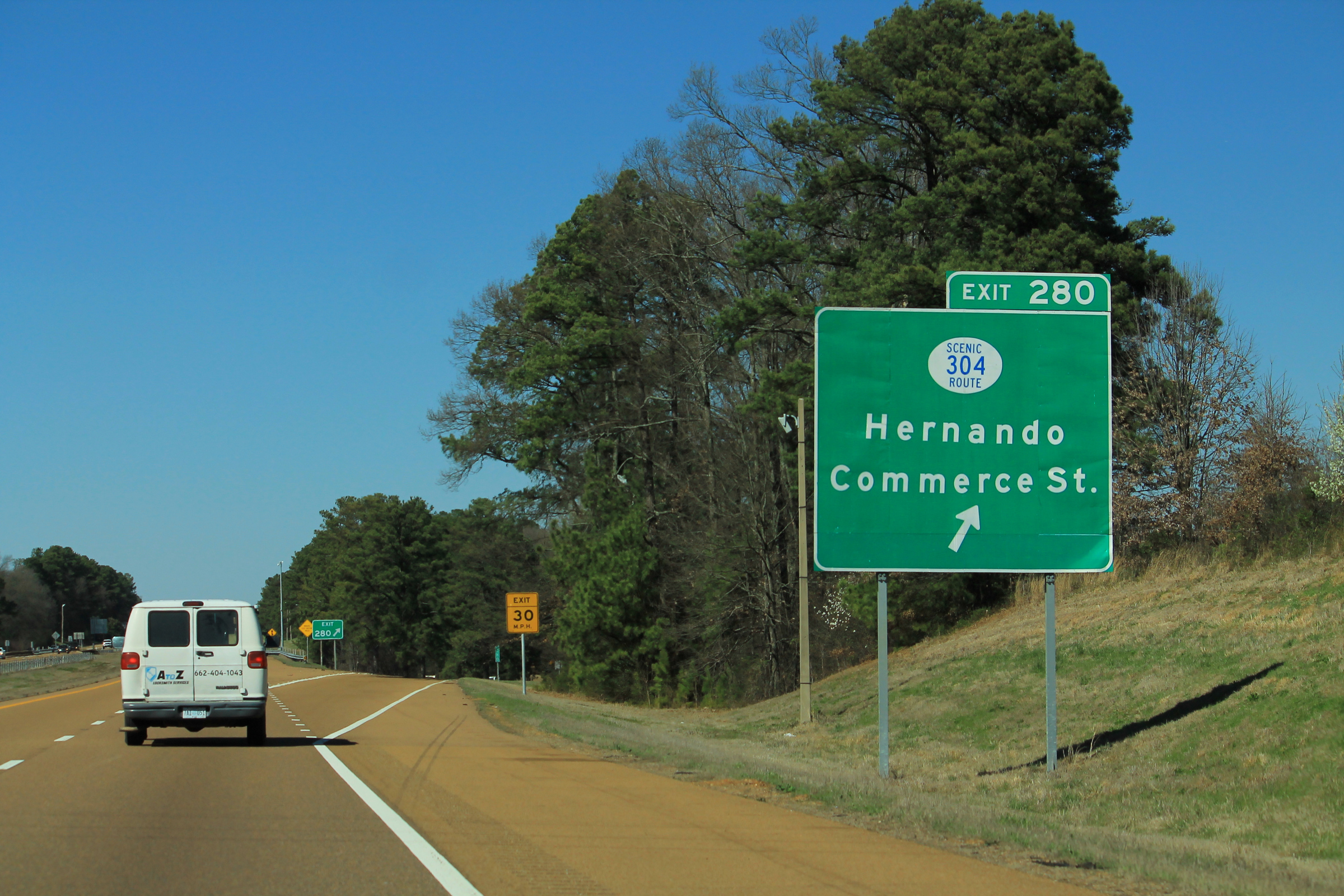
I-55 northbound at the exit for MS 304 Scenic in Hernando (exit 280)

MS 304 Scenic begins in Tate County in the town of Coldwater at an interchange with I-55 (exit 271). It heads west, concurrent with MS 306, as a two-lane through a wooded area on the northern edge of town for about a mile to an intersection with US 51, where MS 306 ends and MS 304 Scenic follows US 51 southbound to enter town. The highway passes through a business district, where they widen to four-lane divided, before passing through a neighborhood and entering downtown, where MS 304 Scenic splits off along W Central Avenue. MS 304 Scenic heads west as a two-lane through a neighborhood before leaving Coldwater and crossing Hickahala Creek. The highway travels through a mix of farmland and wooded areas for several miles to enter the community of Arkabutla, where it becomes concurrent with MS 301. MS 304 Scenic/MS 301 turn northward to Arkabutla and wind their way through some woodlands for a few miles, following along the coastline of the Sunfish Bay of Arkabutla Lake to pass along the western side of Arkabutla Dam, where they cross a bridge over the Coldwater River into De Soto County.

MS 304 Scenic/MS 301 make a sharp left onto Pratt Road for a few miles, where they cross Cub Lake Bayou, before making a sharp right turn and traveling through a mix of farmland and wooded areas to the community of Eudora, where MS 304 Scenic splits off and heads east along Old Highway 304. MS 304 Scenic crosses an extremely swampy area, which is an extension of the northern part of Arkabutla Lake, before traveling through farmland for several miles to enter the Hernando city limits. It enters town along W Commerce Street and passes through a suburb, then a neighborhood, before entering downtown and having another intersection with US 51 via a roundabout around the De Soto County Courthouse. MS 304 Scenic leaves downtown along E Commerce Street and passes through a major business district for several blocks before coming to an end at another interchange with I-55 (exit 280).

Prior to 2006, when mainline MS 304 was relocated onto its new four-lane divided freeway to the north, MS 304 Scenic previously actually met its parent route, with the two running concurrent with each other between Eudora and the I-55 interchange (exit 280) in Hernando, which served as the terminus for both highways.

| County | Location | mi | km | Destinations | Notes |
|---|---|---|---|---|---|
| Tate | Coldwater | 0.0 | 0.0 | I-55 – Grenada, Memphis MS 306 east – Independence | Southern terminus; I-55 exit 271; southern end of MS 306 concurrency |
| Tate | Coldwater | 0.9 | 1.4 | US 51 north – Hernando MS 306 ends | Western terminus of MS 306; southern end of wrong-way US 51 concurrency |
| Tate | Coldwater | 1.7 | 2.7 | US 51 south – Senatobia; E Central Avenue – Downtown | Northern end of wrong-way US 51 concurrency |
| Tate | Arkabutla | 10.2 | 16.4 | MS 301 begins | Southern terminus of MS 301; southern end of MS 301 concurrency |
| De Soto | Eudora | 21.4 | 34.4 | MS 301 north – West Days; Old Highway 304 west – Tunica Resorts | Northern end of MS 301 concurrency; MS 304 Scenic begins following former MS 304 |
| De Soto | | 25.4 | 40.9 | Fogg Road to I-69 / MS 304 – Days | |
| De Soto | | 27.4 | 44.1 | Tulane Road to I-69 / MS 304 – Horn Lake | |
| De Soto | Hernando | 30.3 | 48.8 | US 51 – Coldwater, Horn Lake, Southaven | Via roundabout around De Soto County Courthouse |
| De Soto | Hernando | 31.4 | 50.5 | I-55 – Grenada, Memphis | Northern terminus; I-55 exit 280; road continues east as East Commerce Street |
1.000 mi = 1.609 km; 1.000 km = 0.621 mi: Concurrency terminus
