= Interstate 3 (disambiguation) =

Interstate 3 may refer to either any of four unconnected Interstate Highways in the United States:

- Interstate 3, a former proposed route in Georgia and Tennessee, with a possible route through South Carolina and North Carolina
- Interstate A-3 in Alaska
- Interstate H-3 in Hawaii
- Interstate PRI-3 in Puerto Rico
