= Handy Corner, Mississippi =

- Unincorporated community
- Location within Mississippi Location within the United States
- Coordinates: 34°57′44″N 89°44′31″W
- Country: United States
- State: Mississippi
- County: Desoto
- Elevation: 381 ft (116 m)
- Time zone: UTC-6 (Central (CST))
  - Summer (DST): UTC-5 (CDT)
- Area code: 662
- GNIS feature ID: 690291

Handy Corner is a crossroads and unincorporated community in Olive Branch, in east-central DeSoto County, Mississippi, United States. It lies at the junction of Goodman and Center Hill roads.
