= Jimmie Mattern =

American aviator

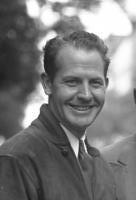
- Mattern in 1932
- Born: James Joseph Mattern; March 8, 1905; Freeport, Illinois, U.S.
- Died: December 17, 1988 (aged 83); Palm Desert, California, U.S.
- Known for: Aerial circumnavigation attempts

James Joseph Mattern (March 8, 1905 – December 17, 1988) was an American aviator. Mattern undertook a number of aviation world records, including twice attempting to break the world record for aerial circumnavigation set by Wiley Post and Harold Gatty. Both attempts failed; the second in 1933 resulted in a crash landing and subsequent rescue by Eskimos and Sigizmund Levanevsky in Chukotka. Mattern would go on to join the search for Levanevsky after he went missing in 1937. Levanevsky was never found.

== Personal life ==
James Mattern was born March 8, 1905, in Freeport, Illinois, to Phillip and Caroline (née Kennedy) Mattern. He also had two older brothers and an older sister. Mattern married Della M. in Los Angeles in 1927. He requested a divorce in Chicago, in 1937, stating that Della had left him in 1932 and was living in Washington.

On May 18, 1937, the day after his divorce was finalized, Mattern was married to Dorothy J. Harvey, a showgirl, at Berwyn Methodist Church. He remained married to Dorothy until his death in 1988. Dorothy died in January 2002.

== Career ==
In 1928, Mattern sold an air plane to an oil company in Texas owned by Michael Benedum. Benedum would later become a frequent financial backer of Mattern's flying activities. In 1937, Mattern was hired as the aeronautical director for the Benedum and Tree's oil company.

Starting in 1938, Mattern was a Lockheed test pilot on the P-38 Lightning and during the war helped develop the 'Piggyback' two-seat version that significantly reduced training accidents. In 1946 he was diagnosed at the Mayo Clinic with a ruptured blood vessel in his brain and was unable to fly again because of the condition. After losing his ability to fly, Mattern and his wife became real estate brokers and then operated a travel agency. He also supported the space program, attended three Apollo launches and had his pilot's license carried to the moon aboard Apollo 11. He also marketed aviation calculators known as the Mattern computer, a course and mileage slide rule, in the late 1940s.

=== Aerial circumnavigation attempts ===
July 5, 1932: Mattern and Bennett Griffin flew The Century of Progress, a Lockheed Vega, powered by a Pratt & Whitney Wasp engine, from Floyd Bennett Field, New York, to Harbor Grace, Newfoundland, and then non-stop to Berlin, in 18:41 hours. This failed round-the-world flight attempt ended in an emergency crash landing at Borisov, Belarus, on July 7, 1932. They did, however, set a record for crossing the Atlantic Ocean: 10 hours, 50 minutes.

June 3, 1933: Mattern flew a rebuilt Century of Progress. largely a different aircraft, and this time solo, from Floyd Bennett Field across the Atlantic. On June 14, 1933, he made a forced landing near Anadyr, in Chukotka, where the Century was abandoned. He was eventually rescued by Eskimos and flown to Nome, Alaska, by Sigizmund Levanevsky. Mattern flew the rest of the way back to New York.

== Honors ==
- 1973: National Aeronautic Association Wesley L. McDonald Elder Statesman Award
- 1981: Oklahoma Air and Space Hall of Fame
- Honorary fellow of the Society of Experimental Test Pilots

== Bibliography ==
- Cloud country Mattern, Jimmie. The Pure oil company. Chicago. 1936. (OCoLC)1369439. ASIN: B001PM7GYU.
- Allen, Thomas. "Guide to the James J. "Jimmie" Mattern Collection" (PDF). The James J. “Jimmie” Mattern Collection, History of Aviation Collection, McDermott Library. University of Texas at Dallas. Archived from the original (PDF) on September 8, 2014.
