= Interstate 269 =

Highway in Mississippi and Tennessee

Interstate 269
- I-269 highlighted in red

Route information
- Auxiliary route of I-69
- Length: 45.19 mi (72.73 km)
- Existed: 2015–present
- History: Opened in 1998 as SR 385
- NHS: Entire route

Major junctions
- South end: I-55 / I-69 / MS 304 in Hernando, MS
- I-22 / US 78 near Byhalia, MS
- North end: I-40 / SR 385 in Arlington, TN

Location
- Country: United States
- States: Mississippi, Tennessee
- Counties: MS: DeSoto, Marshall; TN: Fayette, Shelby

Highway system
- Interstate Highway System; Main; Auxiliary; Suffixed; Business; Future
- Mississippi State Highway System; Interstate; US; State
- Tennessee State Routes; Interstate; US; State
| ← MS 245 | MS | → US 278 |
| ← SR 268 | TN | → SR 269 |

Interstate 269 (I-269) is a partial beltway around the city of Memphis, Tennessee, and its adjacent suburban areas in southwestern Tennessee and northern Mississippi, completed in October 2018. I-269 was planned and built to serve as an outer bypass for the Memphis metropolitan area, funneling through traffic around the metro area while also functioning as a bypass of future I-69, which will run directly through the center of the metro area. I-269 currently connects to its parent route, I-69, at an interchange in Hernando, Mississippi, and will do so again in Millington, Tennessee, in the future.

== Route description ==
I-269 begins at an interchange with I-69 near Hernando, Mississippi. The highway travels eastward across rural areas to the town of Byhalia, Mississippi, where it has an interchange with I-22/U.S. Route 78 (US 78). Here, the highway continues northeastward, slowly veering north towards the Tennessee state line. Entering Tennessee, I-269 has an interchange with US 72 and the southern segment of State Route 385 (SR 385) in Collierville. The route then proceeds north along former SR 385 to an interchange with I-40 and the northern segment of SR 385 in Arlington.

== History ==
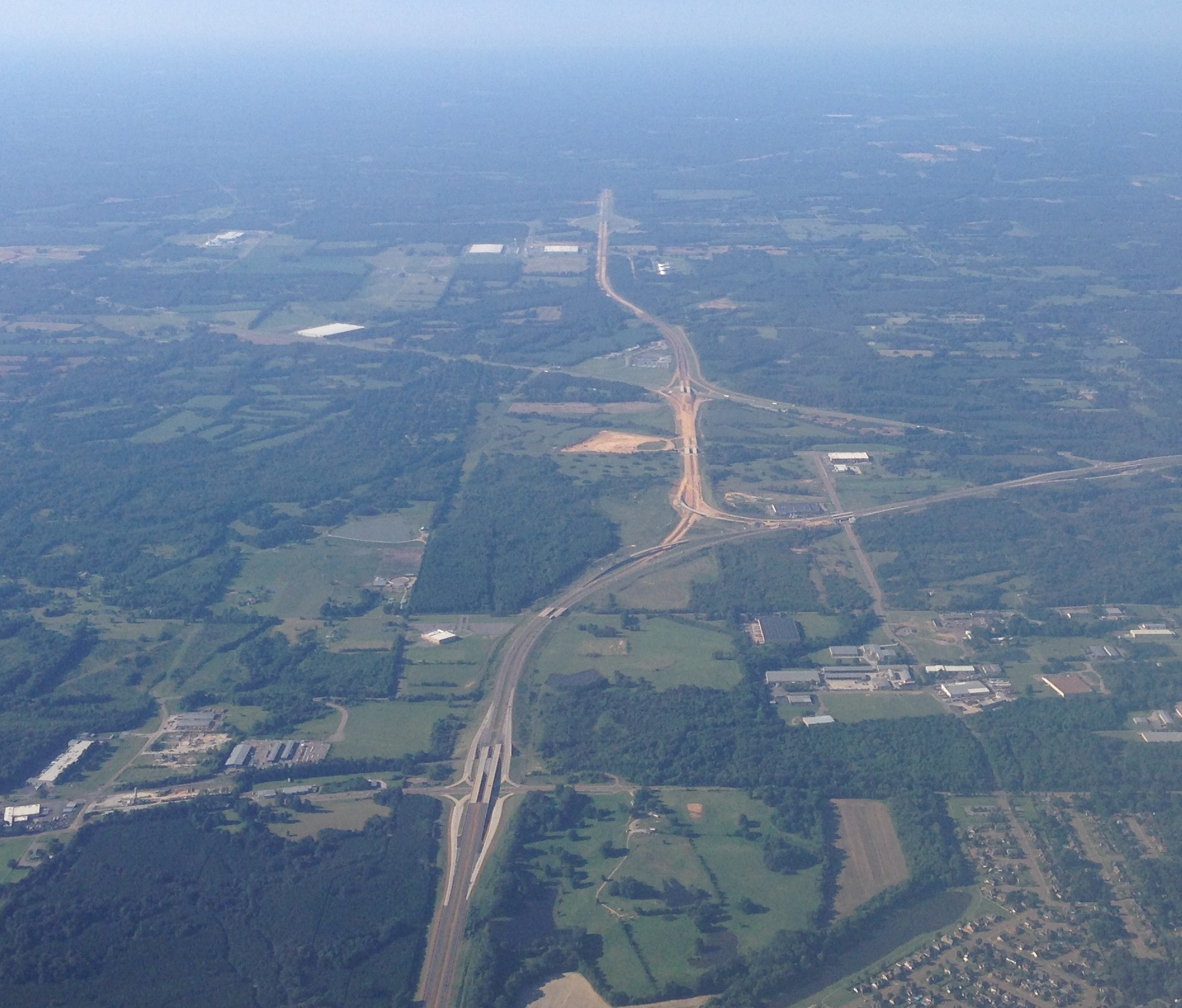
I-269 extension to Mississippi under construction

The Tennessee Department of Transportation's (TDOT) plans called for the two sections to be connected in phases. Plans had the portion extending south from an incomplete interchange with SR 385 south to the Mississippi state line to be completed in October 2015 to coincide with completion of the section in Mississippi from the Tennessee state line to Mississippi Highway 302 (MS 302). On January 29, 2007, the Federal Highway Administration (FHWA) issued a record of decision giving final federal approval for I-269, paving the way for the two states to design and construct the remaining section between Hernando and Collierville.

The first section of what is now I-269, the Winfield Dunn Parkway, from I-40 to US 64 opened on September 4, 2007, signed as SR 385. The segment between US 64 and to SR 193 (Macon Road) opened on June 15, 2009, and the segment between SR 193 and SR 57 opened on November 22, 2013. The last section of the Bill Morris Parkway, most of which remains signed as SR 385, was opened between US 72 and SR 57 on August 23, 2007. This section included provisions for the I-269 interchange that now serves as the eastern terminus of SR 385.

On October 18, 2007, the Mississippi Department of Transportation (MDOT) announced that a bond was successfully issued through the state's Highway Enhancements Through Local Partnerships (HELP) Program for $83 million (equivalent to $121 million in 2024) to cover planning and right-of-way acquisition costs for Mississippi's portion of the route. Mississippi began its part of I-269 construction on June 23, 2011, with the 25-mile (40 km) section from the state line to I-55 totaling construction costs of $640 million (equivalent to $833 million in 2024) as of 2014.

On October 23, 2015, the first signed segment of I-269 opened between the eastern terminus of SR 385 in Collierville and MS 302. On December 5, 2017, the second segment opened between MS 302 and MS 305, including the I-22 interchange.

In 2018, TDOT redesignated a portion of SR 385 between Collierville and I-40 in Arlington as I-269.

The segment of I-269 from the I-55/I-69 interchange in Hernando to MS 305 in Lewisburg, Mississippi, was completed on October 26, 2018, completing the connection between I-40 in Tennessee and I-55 in Mississippi.

The construction costs of the Tennessee portion of SR 385 from the 1980s until completion in 2013 was over $500 million (equivalent to $662 million in 2024). Both states' combined investments were over $1.2 billion (equivalent to $1.59 billion in 2024) for the 64.3-mile (103.5 km) I-269 project, including construction and rights-of-way expense listed above.

On October 13, 2021, a new interchange at McIngvale Road opened to traffic following a ribbon-cutting ceremony. The $8.7-million project also included realigning a 1.5-mile (2.4 km) section of McIngvale Road between Byhalia Road and Green T Road and widening it to five lanes.

== Exit list ==
| State | County | Location | mi | km | Exit | Destinations | Notes |
|---|---|---|---|---|---|---|---|
| Mississippi | DeSoto | Hernando | 0.00 | 0.00 | — | I-69 south / MS 304 west – Tunica, Casinos I-55 / I-69 north – Memphis, Southaven, Jackson | Southern terminus; exit 283A on I-55; southern end of MS 304 concurrency; cloverleaf interchange; freeway continues as I-69 south/MS 304 west |
| Mississippi | DeSoto | | 1.31 | 2.11 | 1 | McIngvale Road | Opened to traffic on October 13, 2021 |
| Mississippi | DeSoto | | 3.17 | 5.10 | 3 | Getwell Road | |
| Mississippi | DeSoto | | 5.18 | 8.34 | 5 | Laughter Road | |
| Mississippi | DeSoto | | 7.32 | 11.78 | 7 | Craft Road | |
| Mississippi | DeSoto | | 9.37 | 15.08 | 9 | MS 305 – Olive Branch, Independence | |
| Mississippi | DeSoto | | 13.41 | 21.58 | 13 | Red Banks Road | |
| Mississippi | DeSoto | Byhalia | 15.57 | 25.06 | 16 | I-22 east / US 78 – Holly Springs, Tupelo, Birmingham, Olive Branch, Memphis | Signed as exits 16A (east) and 16B (west); western terminus of I-22; I-22/US 78 exit 12 |
| Mississippi | Marshall | | 17.85 | 28.73 | 18 | MS 309 – Byhalia | |
| Mississippi | Marshall | Cayce | 23.79 | 38.29 | 23 | MS 302 – Southaven, Olive Branch | |
| Mississippi–Tennessee state line | | | | | MS 304 ends | | |
| Tennessee | Shelby–Fayette county line | Collierville–Piperton line | 27.24 | 43.84 | 1 | US 72 (SR 86) – Collierville, Corinth | |
| Tennessee | Shelby–Fayette county line | Collierville–Piperton line | 28.55 | 45.95 | 2 | SR 385 west (Bill Morris Parkway) – Memphis | Eastern terminus of SR 385 |
| Tennessee | Fayette | Piperton | 29.55 | 47.56 | 3 | SR 57 – Piperton, Collierville | |
| Tennessee | Fayette–Shelby county line | | 37.75 | 60.75 | 11 | SR 193 – Macon, Fisherville | |
| Tennessee | Shelby | Arlington | 41.70 | 67.11 | 15 | US 64 (SR 15) – Bartlett, Somerville | |
| Tennessee | Shelby | Arlington | 44.56 | 71.71 | 18 | Donelson Farms Parkway | |
| Tennessee | Shelby | Arlington | 45.19 | 72.73 | 19 | I-40 / SR 385 north – Memphis, Nashville | Signed as exits 19A (east) and 19B (west); exit 24A on I-40; freeway continues as SR 385 north |
1.000 mi = 1.609 km; 1.000 km = 0.621 mi: Concurrency terminus
