= Bennett Griffin =

American aviator (1895–1978)

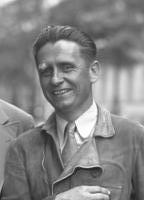
- Bennett Griffin in Berlin following an aborted attempt to fly around the world in 1932.
- Born: Bennett Hill Griffin; September 22, 1895; Barton, Mississippi, U.S.
- Died: April 26, 1978 (aged 82); Washington, D.C., U.S.
- Awards: Legion of Merit; Distinguished Flying Cross
- Aviation career
- Air force: U.S. Army Air Force
- Rank: Colonel

Bennett Hill Griffin (September 22, 1895 – April 26, 1978) was an American aviator. Griffin was born in Mississippi in 1895, but was raised in Oklahoma arriving around 1900. In 1932, Griffin along with Jimmie Mattern attempted to break the world record for aerial circumnavigation set by Wiley Post and Harold Gatty. In 1946 / 1947, he administered the relocation of the Civil Aeronautics Administration center from Houston to Oklahoma City, where it later became known as the FAA's Mike Monroney Aeronautical Center. He served as the Director of Washington National Airport from 1947 until 1959. In 1941, he was also the first pilot to land at National Airport, flying for American Airlines at the time. He died in 1978 and was buried in Arlington National Cemetery.

== Aerial circumnavigation record attempts ==
July 1932, Griffin and Jimmie Mattern flew "The Century of Progress", a Lockheed Vega, powered by a Pratt & Whitney Wasp engine, from Floyd Bennett Field, New York to Harbour Grace, Newfoundland, and then non-stop to Berlin, Germany in 18:41 hours. They continued as far as Borisov, Belarus, USSR in this failed round-the-world flight attempt. They did set a new record for crossing the Atlantic Ocean in 10 hours, 50 minutes.

== Honors ==
- 1973 National Aeronautic Association Wesley L. McDonald Elder Statesman Award
