= Barton, Mississippi =

- Unincorporated community
- Location within Mississippi Location within the United States
- Coordinates: 34°57′50″N 89°41′21″W
- Country: United States
- State: Mississippi
- County: Marshall
- Elevation: 394 ft (120 m)
- Time zone: UTC-6 (Central (CST))
  - Summer (DST): UTC-5 (CDT)
- Area code: 662
- GNIS feature ID: 691685

Barton is an unincorporated community in western Marshall County, Mississippi, United States. It is located at the intersection of State Highway 302 (Goodman Road) and State Highway 309 (Byhalia Road). A post office operated under the name Barton from 1884 to 1905. In 1900, Barton had a population of 45.

== Notable person ==
Aviator Bennett Griffin, who once held a record time for crossing the Atlantic, was born in Barton.
