= Coldwater River (Mississippi) =

River in Mississippi, United States

Coordinates: 34.3751077°N 90.3762077°W

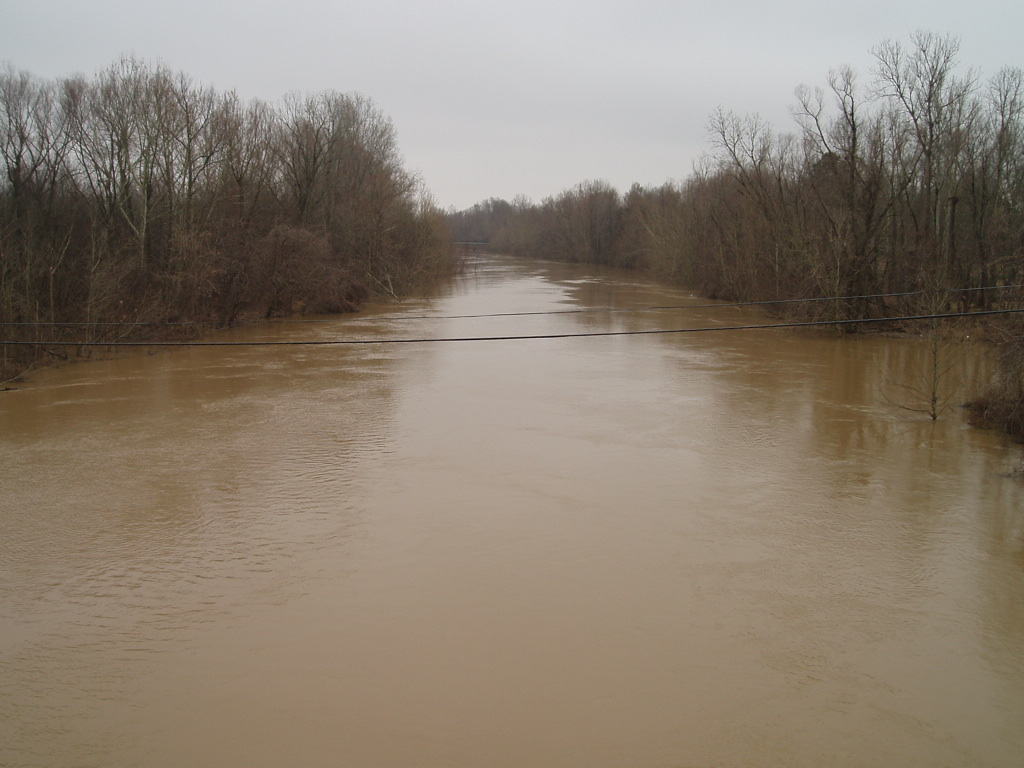
The Coldwater River in Marks

The Coldwater River is a river which flows for 220 miles (350 km) through northwestern Mississippi in the United States. It is a tributary of the Tallahatchie River, and part of the watershed of the Mississippi River, via the Yazoo River.

In the past, the Coldwater River has been referred to as the Okalopasaw, Copasaw, or Cold Water River. The one-word name "Coldwater" was officially settled upon in 1891.

== Course ==
The Coldwater River rises in Marshall County, Mississippi, along Mississippi Highway 4 near the Benton County line. The river then flows northwest through a corner of Benton County and then the breadth of Marshall county to a point just south of the unincorporated community of Barton, where it turns southwest as it enters DeSoto County. Along the Desoto County-Tate County line, the river is impounded by a U.S. Army Corps of Engineers dam to form Arkabutla Lake.

From Arkabutla Lake the Coldwater River takes a mostly southerly course, flowing roughly parallel to the nearby Mississippi River, as the Coldwater forms the boundary between Tate and Tunica counties, and then passes through Quitman County to its confluence with the Tallahatchie River south of the town of Marks. At Savage, the river averages a flow of 1,368 cubic feet per second.

== See also ==
- List of Mississippi rivers

== Sources ==
- US EPA Watershed assessment database Coldwater River watershed
