= Arkabutla Lake =

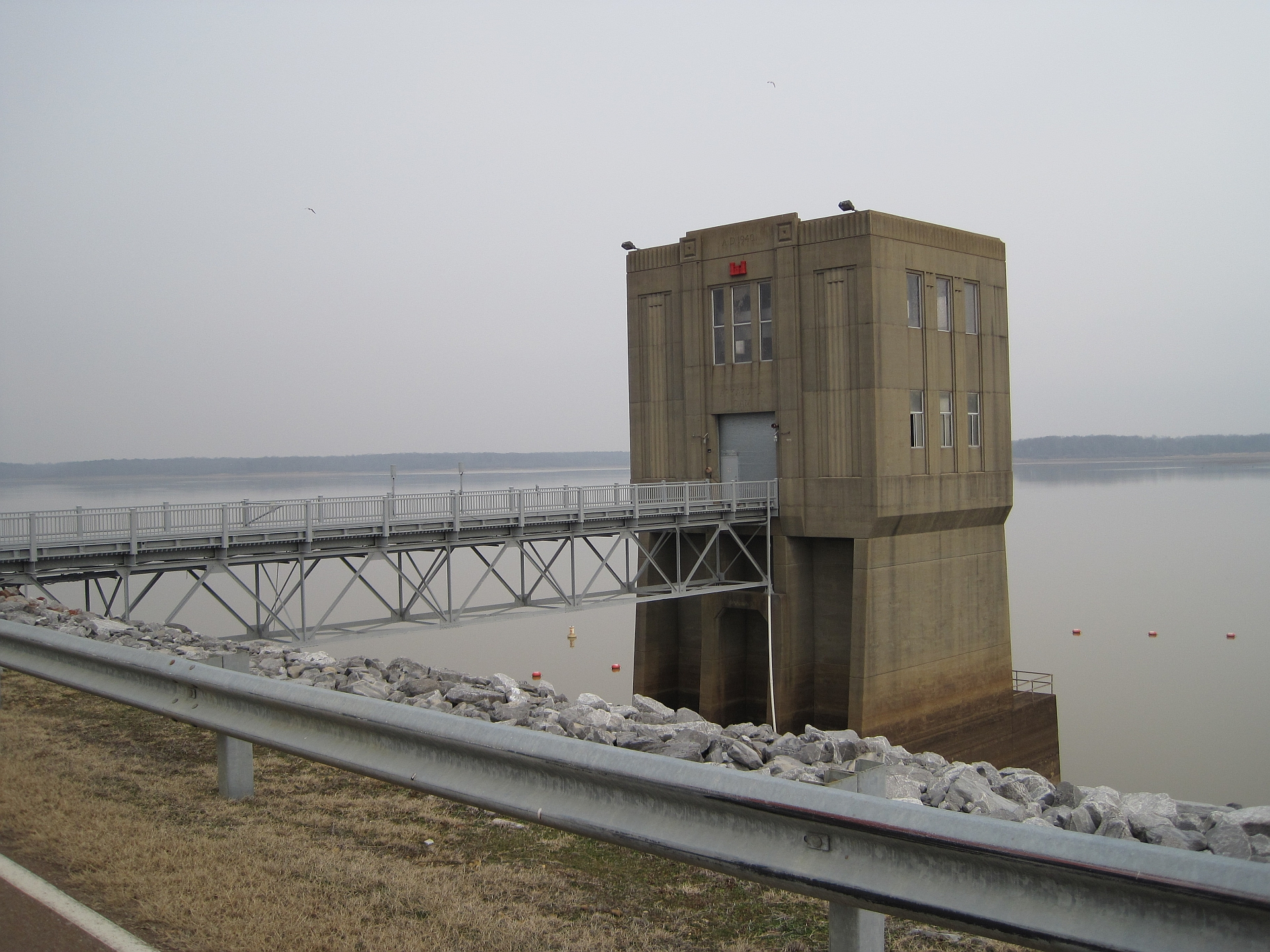
- Arkabutla Lake

- Location within Mississippi Location within the United States
- Location: DeSoto / Tate counties, Mississippi, United States
- Coordinates: 34°45′42″N 090°07′20″W
- Type: reservoir
- Primary inflows: Coldwater River
- Primary outflows: Coldwater River
- Basin countries: United States
- Surface elevation: 226 ft (69 m)

Arkabutla Lake is a reservoir on the Coldwater River in the U.S. state of Mississippi. It was created following the construction of the Arkabutla Dam in 1940 on the Coldwater River.

The dam is located on Arkabutla Dam Rd (Mississippi Highway 301/Mississippi Highway 304 Scenic) approximately 4 miles (6.4 km) north of the small community of Arkabutla. It is one of four Flood Damage Reduction reservoirs in northern Mississippi, the others being Sardis, Enid and Grenada lakes.

With an annual visitation exceeding 2 million people, Arkabutla Lake accommodates a wide variety of recreational interests and activities throughout the entire year. The Arkabutla Lake project includes 57,250 acres (231.7 km^{2}) of land and water. The dam is 11,500 ft (3,500 m) long with an average height of 67 ft (20 m). There are 37,700 acres (153 km^{2}) of land at the project which are open to the public for hunting.

On May 10, 2023, the United States Army Corps of Engineers warned residents to stay away from the reservoir as "potential breach conditions" had been found at the dam. The dam is undergoing emergency repairs. Though they stated that failure is not imminent, the National Weather Service forecast office in Memphis issued a flash flood watch through June 10 for areas of seven northwestern Mississippi counties located downstream of the dam.

== History ==
According to the U.S. Army Corps of Engineers website, after a series of disastrous floods during the mid-19th century and early 20th century, high priority was given to flood control projects. The worst flood in modern history of the Lower Mississippi Valley occurred in the Great Mississippi Flood of 1927; the resulting damage and destruction was a catalyst for a comprehensive program to be developed for flood control along the Mississippi River and its tributaries. The U.S. Army Corps of Engineers became the planners, designers and builders of the flood control projects. These projects were made possible by Congress passing the Flood Control Act of 1937.

Engineers determined the headwaters of the Yazoo River contributed to or caused much of the flooding that occurred in the Mississippi Delta region. In addition to the construction of levees along the Yazoo River, four flood control reservoirs were constructed in north Mississippi as part of the Yazoo Basin Headwater Project. Arkabutla Dam, the second of the dams to be built, was constructed in 1940 on the Coldwater River.

In 1942, the U.S. Government moved the town of Coldwater and approximately 700 residents, at a cost of $250,000, to its present location 1-mile (1.6 km) south of the original site. Today a monument dedicated to the old town of Coldwater, which was flooded and submerged by creation of the dam and reservoir, stands just west of the Coldwater exit off Interstate 55. A few remnants of the old town are visible, but a majority of the site remains underwater year round.

When completed, the Yazoo Headwater Project will protect 1,209,000 acres (4,890 km^{2}) of land against flooding and will partially protect another 303,000 acres (1,230 km^{2}). Benefits of the Headwater Project are reduced flooding around the cities of Greenwood, Yazoo City, Belzoni, and other smaller communities within the Yazoo River Basin. It has led to increased agricultural and industrial productivity because more land is available for these purposes. As a result, the region's national and international markets for produce have greatly increased, and families have benefited from the growing job market.

== Fish ==
The main fish that live in the lake are Largemouth bass, Channel catfish, Flathead catfish, Blue catfish, Black crappie, White crappie, Bluegill, Green sunfish, Longear sunfish, Redear sunfish, Warmouth, White bass.

== Representation in other media ==
The Coen brothers' movie, O Brother, Where Art Thou? (2000), set in 1937, has action taking place in a valley that is flooded during the construction of the (fictional) Arktabutta Reservoir, based on Arkabutla Lake. A brief still shot of a newspaper dated Tuesday, July 13, 1937, bears the headline "T.V.A. FINALIZING PLANS FOR FLOODING OF ARKTABUTTA VALLEY". The character Everett McGill claimed to have buried treasure at a cabin located in that valley.

== Sources ==
- U.S. Geological Survey Geographic Names Information System: Arkabutla Lake
