= Interstate 69 in Mississippi =

Highway in Mississippi

Interstate 69
- I-69 highlighted in red

Route information
- Maintained by MDOT
- Length: 23.39 mi (37.64 km)
- NHS: Entire route

Major junctions
- South end: MS 713 near Banks
- I-55 / I-269 / MS 304 in Hernando; MS 302 in Southaven
- North end: I-55 at the Tennessee state line in Southaven

Location
- Country: United States
- State: Mississippi
- Counties: Tunica, DeSoto

Highway system
- Interstate Highway System; Main; Auxiliary; Suffixed; Business; Future; Mississippi State Highway System; Interstate; US; State
← MS 67	→ MS 69

The proposed Interstate 69 (I-69) extension from Indianapolis southwest to Texas currently has a short piece completed in the US state of Mississippi, south of Memphis, Tennessee. The south end is an at-grade intersection with the former route of Mississippi Highway 304 (MS 304) near Tunica Resorts, where MS 713 continues west to U.S. Highway 61 (US 61), and the route continues north to the Mississippi state line. Much of the route overlaps MS 304, which intersects US 61 farther north than MS 713. MS 304 continues east from I-55, connecting to State Route 385 (SR 385) in Tennessee, forming part of the I-269 Memphis outer beltway.

== Route description ==
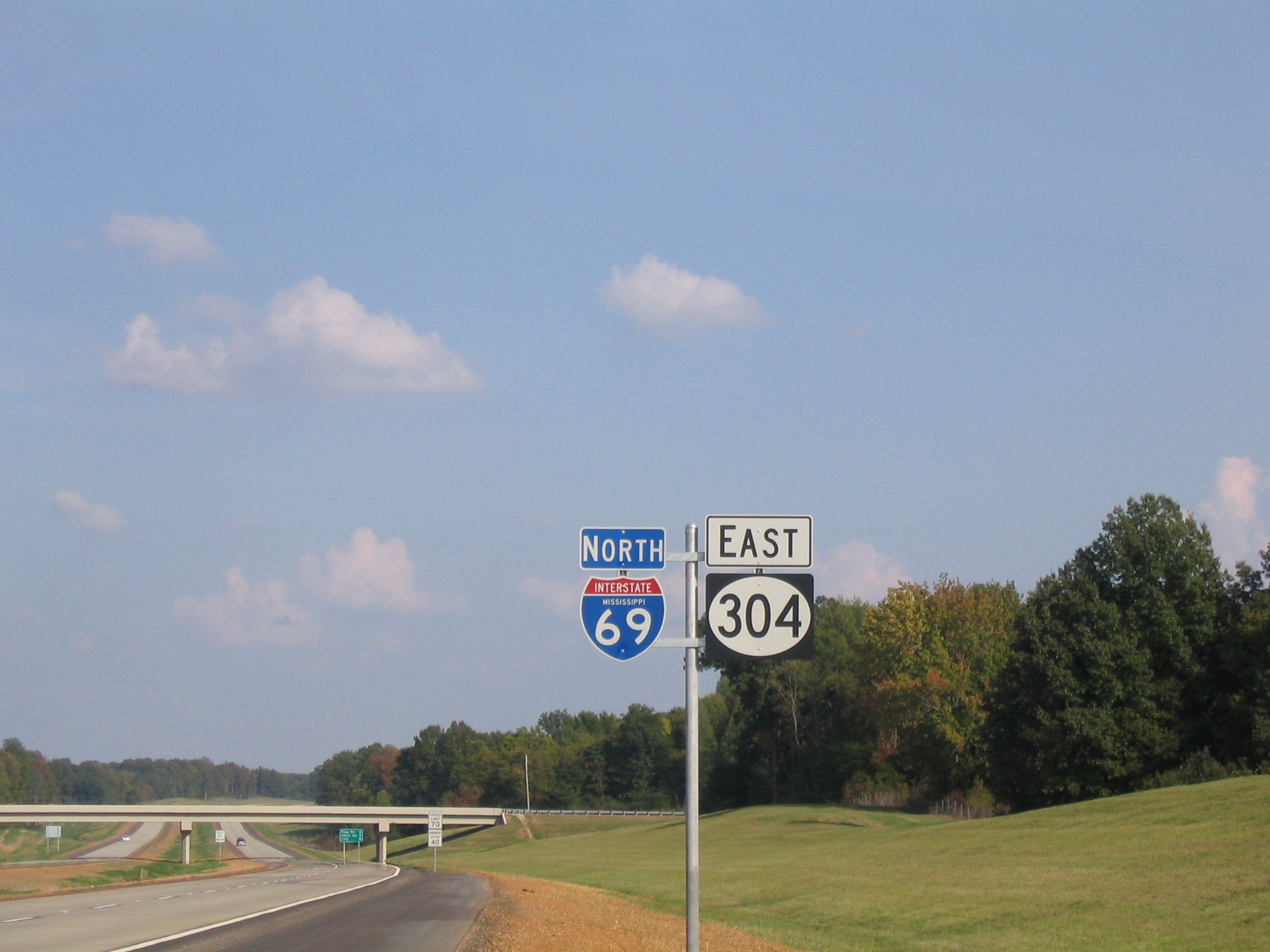
A portion of I-69 cosigned with MS 304

I-69 has been divided into a number of sections of independent utility (SIUs).

=== SIU 9 (Mississippi portion) ===
At the Mississippi–Tennessee state line, I-69 enters Mississippi from the north concurrently with I-55 and follows the previously constructed route of I-55 south to Hernando, Mississippi, for approximately eight miles (13 km), where it meets I-269.

On January 18, 2008, the Federal Highway Administration (FHWA) authorized the states of Mississippi and Tennessee to extend I-69 from the I-40/SR 300 interchange in north Memphis to the I-55/I-69 interchange in Hernando; in late May 2008, Mississippi began posting signs reflecting the extension of the route. Tennessee signed I-69 along I-55 north to I-240 for a few months and then removed the I-69 shields.

=== SIU 10 ===
Segment 10 of the I-69 extension was originally planned and built as part of the MS 304 relocation project to link the Tunica County casinos to I-55. Planning of the MS 304 Bypass predates I-69 planning in Mississippi, and federal and state officials opted to route I-69 over this segment in 2000 since it was nearing the start of construction. It also eliminated the need for constructing a new highway while still accomplishing the intended goals for the I-69 corridor.

In Hernando, I-69 diverges from I-55 at the interchange with I-269 and turns west for approximately 16 miles (26 km) to the area around the Tunica County casinos. A ribbon-cutting ceremony took place at 2:00 pm CST on October 3, 2006, at which point the road was opened to traffic. This segment's opening also coincided with Mississippi's Statewide Transportation Conference, held in Tunica. The state's HELP program, with funding raised from Tunica County's casino gaming revenues, enabled this segment to be completed three years ahead of schedule.

This portion of I-69 mostly coincides with the relocated route of MS 304; both routes are cosigned between I-55 and the MS 713 spur, where the two routes split: MS 304 continues due west to US 61, while I-69 (cosigned with MS 713) turns south to connect to the old routing of MS 304 near Banks, Mississippi. The MS 713 portion of the route opened to traffic December 18, 2006.

I-55 and I-69 meet at a cloverleaf interchange near Hernando; with I-269 and MS 304 continuing to the east. To accommodate the volume of traffic anticipated to pass through this interchange and meet current FHWA standards for cloverleaf interchanges, collector–distributor roads were added to the I-55 mainline in the vicinity of the interchange.

As of December 18, 2006, all work on SIU 10 is complete and the entire segment is open to traffic. Because I-69 is still incomplete through the remainder of Mississippi (SIUs 11 and 12), exits are unnumbered on the Hernando–Tunica segment. The two control cities used on the SIU 10 segment are Memphis and Tunica, although the route does not yet reach the town of Tunica. The additional control city of Southaven is used at the interchange with I-55 and I-269 along the northern duplex.

== Future ==
=== SIU 11 ===
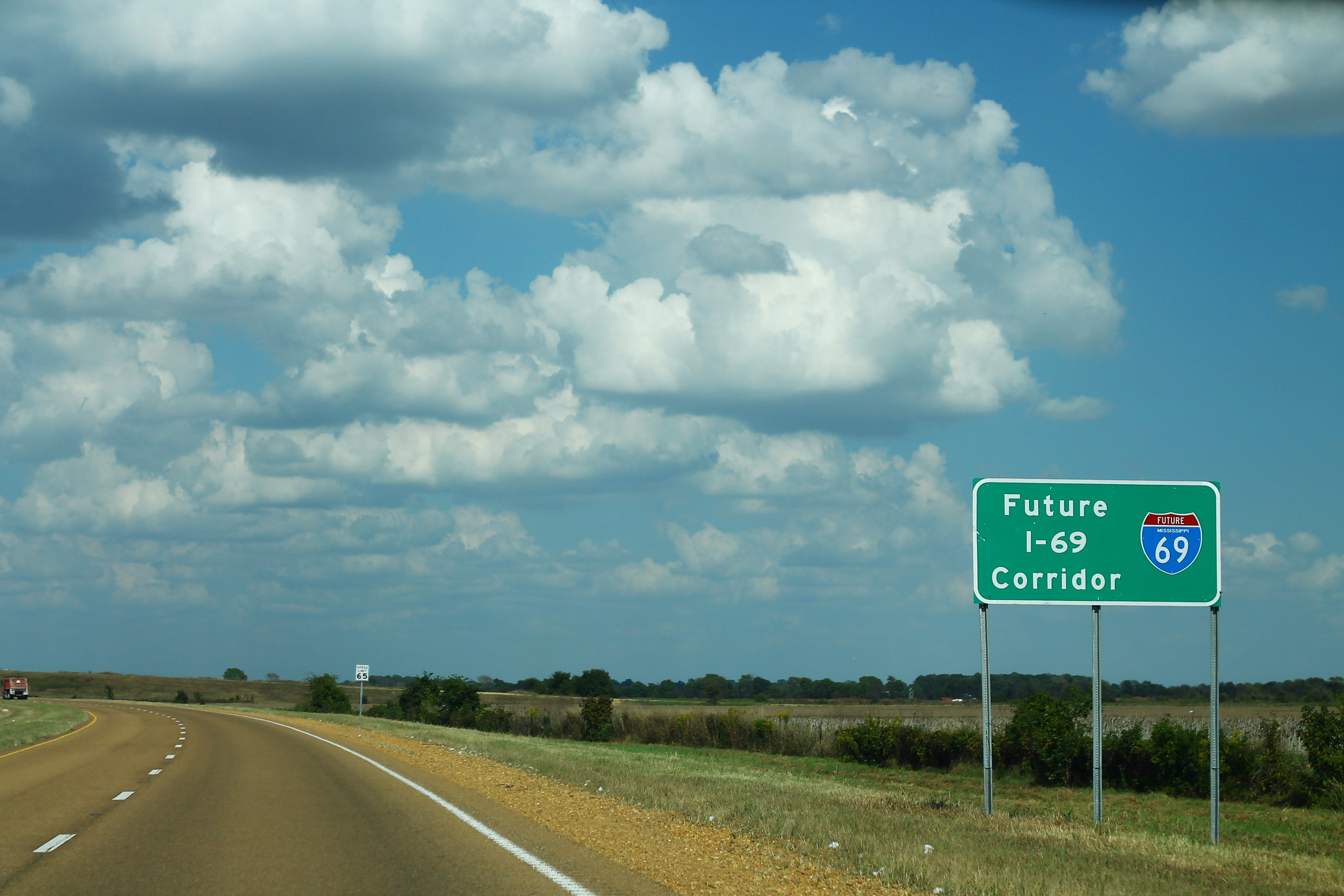
"Future I-69 Corridor" sign along US 61/US 278 in Clarksdale

Continuing south from its present (temporary) terminus at MS 3 near Banks, I-69 will bypass the town of Tunica to the east (serving the Tunica Municipal Airport), then veer to the west and merge with US 61 route to Clarksdale, also merging with US 49 near Rich. In 2006, the Mississippi Department of Transportation (MDOT) decided to incorporate the recently completed Clarksdale Bypass into the future I-69 alignment through the Clarksdale vicinity, since the bypass was already at Interstate standards.

In Clarksdale, I-69 will merge with US 278 and continue south, serving Shelby and following the existing US 61 route. I-69 and US 278 will diverge from US 61 near Merigold, bypassing Cleveland to the west, and continue south to near Shaw, then west to Benoit where it will intersect MS 1. The final environmental impact statement (EIS) for SIU 11 was approved in August 2010, and the record of decision (ROD) was issued in September 2010. Due to funding issues, no major construction on this section of I-69 is expected for the time being.

In March 2026, a proposal called for I-69 to be extended from current terminus to State Route 4 east of Tunica.

=== SIU 12 (Mississippi portion) ===
From Benoit, I-69 and US 278 will cross the planned Charles W. Dean Bridge (sometimes referred to as the Great River Bridge) over the Mississippi River into Arkansas. Mississippi's portion of SIU 12 consists of the eastern end of the Dean Bridge; Arkansas's portion will continue from the Dean Bridge to US 65 near McGehee. Environmental studies for this segment, including the Dean Bridge, have been completed and the FHWA issued an ROD approving the route through SIU 12 in 2004. SIU 12 and the Dean Bridge are considered "shovel ready", pending the availability of funding and completion of right-of-way acquisition for the Mississippi approach to the bridge.

== Exit list ==
Exits along I-69 are currently unnumbered.

County	Location	mi	km	Exit	Destinations	Notes
Tunica	Tunica				MS 4	proposed
Tunica	Tunica				Arkabutla Dam Rd	proposed
Tunica	Tunica				Prichard Rd	proposed
Tunica	Tunica				Kirby-Counce Road	proposed
Tunica	Tunica	0.00	0.00		MS 713 south	Continuation south; southern end of MS 713 concurrency; future I-69 south
DeSoto		3.73	6.00	—	MS 304 west MS 713 ends	Southbound exit and northbound entrance; southern end of MS 304 concurrency; northern terminus of MS 713
DeSoto		5.51	8.87	—	MS 301	
DeSoto		9.44	15.19	—	Fogg Road	
DeSoto	Hernando	11.44	18.41	—	Tulane Road	Formerly signed as Odom Road
DeSoto	Hernando	14.46	23.27	283	I-55 south / I-269 north / MS 304 east – Jackson, Grenada, Collierville	Signed as exits 283A (north) and 283B (south); exit nos. not signed northbound; northern end of MS 304 concurrency; southern end of I-55 concurrency
DeSoto	Hernando	15.89	25.57	284	Nesbit Road	
DeSoto	Southaven	19.28	31.03	287	Church Road – Southaven, Horn Lake	
DeSoto	Southaven	21.32	34.31	289	MS 302 (Goodman Road) – Southaven, Horn Lake, Olive Branch	
Mississippi–Tennessee line		23.39	37.64	291	Southaven	Access via Main Street/Stateline Road
Mississippi–Tennessee line		23.39	37.64		I-55 north / Future I-69 north – Memphis	Continuation into Tennessee; northern end of I-55 concurrency; future I-69 north
1.000 mi = 1.609 km; 1.000 km = 0.621 mi: Concurrency terminus; Unopened

Interstate 69
Previous state: Arkansas	Mississippi	Next state: Tennessee
