= Interstate 3 =

Proposed Interstate Highway in Georgia and Tennessee in the United States

Future Interstate 3
- 3rd Infantry Division Highway
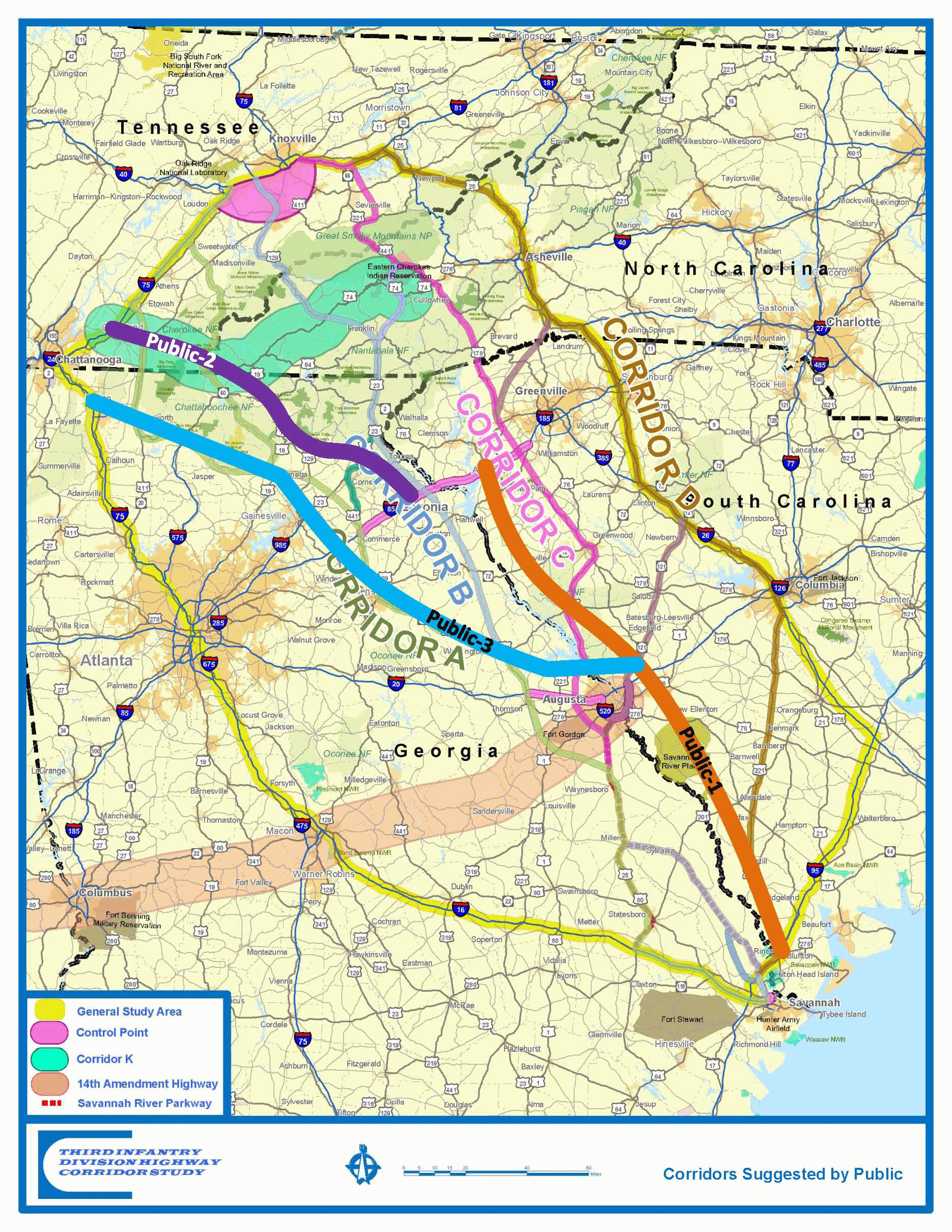

Major junctions
- South end: Bulloch County or Savannah, Georgia
- North end: Knoxville, Tennessee

Location
- Country: United States

Highway system
- Interstate Highway System; Main; Auxiliary; Suffixed; Business; Future

Interstate 3 (I-3), the 3rd Infantry Division Highway, was a proposed Interstate Highway in the United States to run from Savannah, Georgia, north to Augusta, Georgia, and Knoxville, Tennessee. The roadway was proposed in the same federal highway measure that led to a proposal for I-14.

== History ==
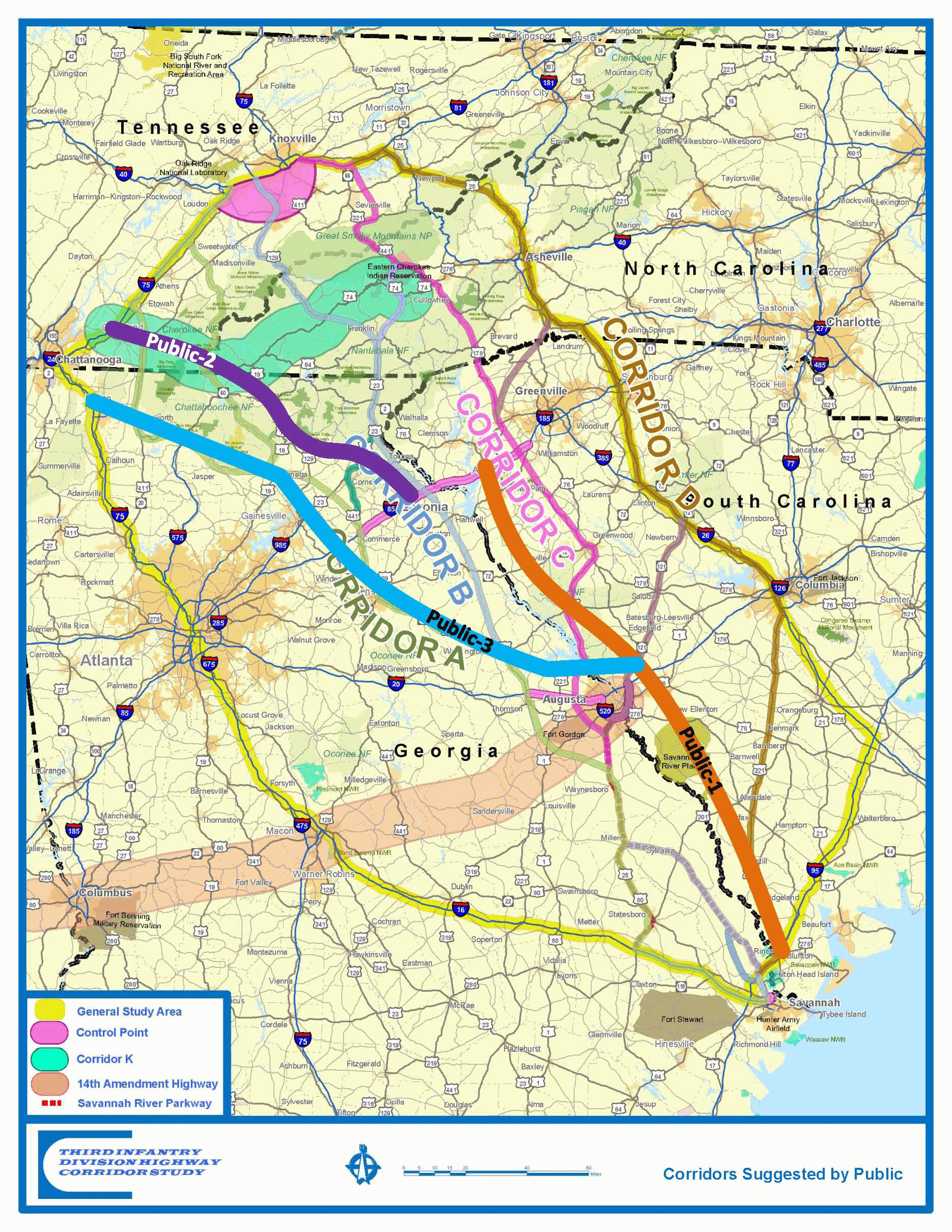
Map of the study area with the four corridors proposed by the Federal Highway Administration and three corridors suggested by members of the public during the study

In 2005, the Safe, Accountable, Flexible, Efficient Transportation Equity Act: A Legacy for Users (SAFETEA-LU) was signed into law by then-President George W. Bush. The act included the proposed corridors for the planned I-14 (specifically as the 14th Amendment Highway), and I-3 (as the 3rd Infantry Division Highway). The legislation did not provide the official numbering nor did it provide funding for the highways.

The proposed numbering of the highway did not follow the pattern of the existing Interstate Highway grid but is noted to salute and honor the 3rd Infantry Division of the US Army, based at Fort Stewart, near Savannah, Georgia.

According to the Georgia Department of Transportation, the existing Savannah River Parkway, which carries the unsigned designations State Route 555 (SR 555) and SR 565, was open to traffic. It begins just northwest of Savannah at the intersection of I-95 and SR 21/SR 30. It travels northwesterly along SR 21, paralleling the Savannah River, to Millen, where it meets US Route 25 (US 25). From Millen, the roadway follows US 25 to I-520 in Augusta. A western branch of the Savannah River Parkway travels from I-16 south of Statesboro north and northwestward (following US 25) to meet the main parkway roadway in Millen.

The proposal faced local opposition from groups concerned about the environmental impact of the Interstate Highway. No date for construction of the highway was set. The federal government began a study of the proposed route in July 2010. In early 2012, the Federal Highway Administration released a report to the US Congress noting the potential financial and environmental costs of the highway as well as the public opposition, concluding that constructing the highway was infeasible.

== Route description ==
The actual route of I-3 was unknown. However, the 2005 SAFETEA-LU legislation indicated that, in Georgia, I-3 would've followed the existing Savannah River Parkway from Savannah to Augusta.

Due to the difficulties of building a new highway through the Appalachian Mountains, the highway's proposed route north of Augusta was less clear. In early 2008, officials introduced the possibility of routing I-3 through Greenwood, South Carolina, and continuing on to Greenville. Other potential routes continued in Georgia along US 441, US 129 (along the Dragon, an 11-mile-long (18 km) stretch of road in North Carolina and Tennessee adjoining Great Smoky Mountains National Park with 318 curves), or SR 77.

The proposed numbering of the highway did not fit within the usual conventions of the existing Interstate Highway grid, where primary north–south highways are assigned odd numbers, and such odd route numbers increase from west to east. Under the normal Interstate Highway grid, I-3 should instead be located on the West Coast between the Pacific Ocean and I-5. All odd numbers between I-75 and I-95 are already assigned, but most of them are confined to states well north of the proposed route. The 2017 approval of the second I-87 in North Carolina in addition to the I-87 in New York may indicate willingness to duplicate other north–south route numbers.

== See also ==
- Central Savannah River Area
