= Lynchburg, Mississippi =

Census designated place in DeSoto County, Mississippi, United States

- Census-designated place
- Location of Lynchburg, Mississippi

- Location in the United States
- Coordinates: 34°57′44″N 90°06′19″W
- Country: United States
- State: Mississippi
- County: DeSoto

Area
  - Total: 1.97 sq mi (5.10 km^{2})
  - Land: 1.93 sq mi (5.01 km^{2})
  - Water: 0.035 sq mi (0.09 km^{2})
- Elevation: 295 ft (90 m)

Population (2020)
  - Total: 2,466
  - Density: 1,275.4/sq mi (492.45/km^{2})
- Time zone: UTC-6 (Central (CST))
  - Summer (DST): UTC-5 (CDT)
- FIPS code: 28-42840
- GNIS feature ID: 2403250

Lynchburg is a census-designated place (CDP) in DeSoto County, Mississippi, United States. As of the 2020 census, Lynchburg had a population of 2,466.

== Geography ==
Lynchburg is bordered to the east by the city of Horn Lake.

According to the United States Census Bureau, the Lynchburg CDP has a total area of 2.0 square miles (5.1 km^{2}), of which 1.9 square miles (5.0 km^{2}) is land and 0.04 square miles (0.1 km^{2}), or 1.80%, is water. The area of the CDP decreased from 3.5 square miles (9.1 km^{2}) at the 2000 census due to annexation of the eastern part of the CDP by the city of Horn Lake.

== Demographics ==
Historical population
Census	Pop.	Note	%±
2000	2,959		—
2010	2,437		−17.6%
2020	2,466		1.2%
U.S. Decennial Census

=== 2020 census ===
As of the 2020 census, Lynchburg had a population of 2,466. The median age was 38.0 years. 24.5% of residents were under the age of 18 and 13.4% of residents were 65 years of age or older. For every 100 females there were 95.7 males, and for every 100 females age 18 and over there were 98.8 males age 18 and over.

83.9% of residents lived in urban areas, while 16.1% lived in rural areas.

There were 871 households in Lynchburg, of which 30.8% had children under the age of 18 living in them. Of all households, 51.2% were married-couple households, 15.8% were households with a male householder and no spouse or partner present, and 27.0% were households with a female householder and no spouse or partner present. About 26.2% of all households were made up of individuals and 9.1% had someone living alone who was 65 years of age or older.

There were 911 housing units, of which 4.4% were vacant. The homeowner vacancy rate was 0.9% and the rental vacancy rate was 15.4%.

Racial composition as of the 2020 census
Race	Number	Percent
White	1,580	64.1%
Black or African American	657	26.6%
American Indian and Alaska Native	11	0.4%
Asian	20	0.8%
Native Hawaiian and Other Pacific Islander	4	0.2%
Some other race	44	1.8%
Two or more races	150	6.1%
Hispanic or Latino (of any race)	105	4.3%

=== 2000 census ===
As of the census of 2000, there were 2,959 people, 1,037 households, and 850 families residing in the CDP. The population density was 859.9 inhabitants per square mile (332.0/km^{2}). There were 1,087 housing units at an average density of 315.9 per square mile (122.0/km^{2}). The racial makeup of the CDP was 93.17% White, 1.99% African American, 0.34% Native American, 1.05% Asian, 0.10% Pacific Islander, 2.91% from other races, and 0.44% from two or more races. Hispanic or Latino of any race were 4.12% of the population.

There were 1,037 households, out of which 41.0% had children under the age of 18 living with them, 67.4% were married couples living together, 9.4% had a female householder with no husband present, and 18.0% were non-families. 13.5% of all households were made up of individuals, and 3.4% had someone living alone who was 65 years of age or older. The average household size was 2.85 and the average family size was 3.11.

In the CDP, the population was spread out, with 28.1% under the age of 18, 8.1% from 18 to 24, 34.9% from 25 to 44, 22.1% from 45 to 64, and 6.8% who were 65 years of age or older. The median age was 33 years. For every 100 females, there were 101.8 males. For every 100 females age 18 and over, there were 99.7 males.

The median income for a household in the CDP was $54,714, and the median income for a family was $61,495. Males had a median income of $41,586 versus $25,332 for females. The per capita income for the CDP was $20,455. About 5.9% of families and 9.0% of the population were below the poverty line, including 10.1% of those under age 18 and 8.9% of those age 65 or over.

== Education ==
Lynchburg is served by the DeSoto County School District.

== See also ==
- List of census-designated places in Mississippi
