= Mississippi River in the American Civil War =

Strategically significant waterway

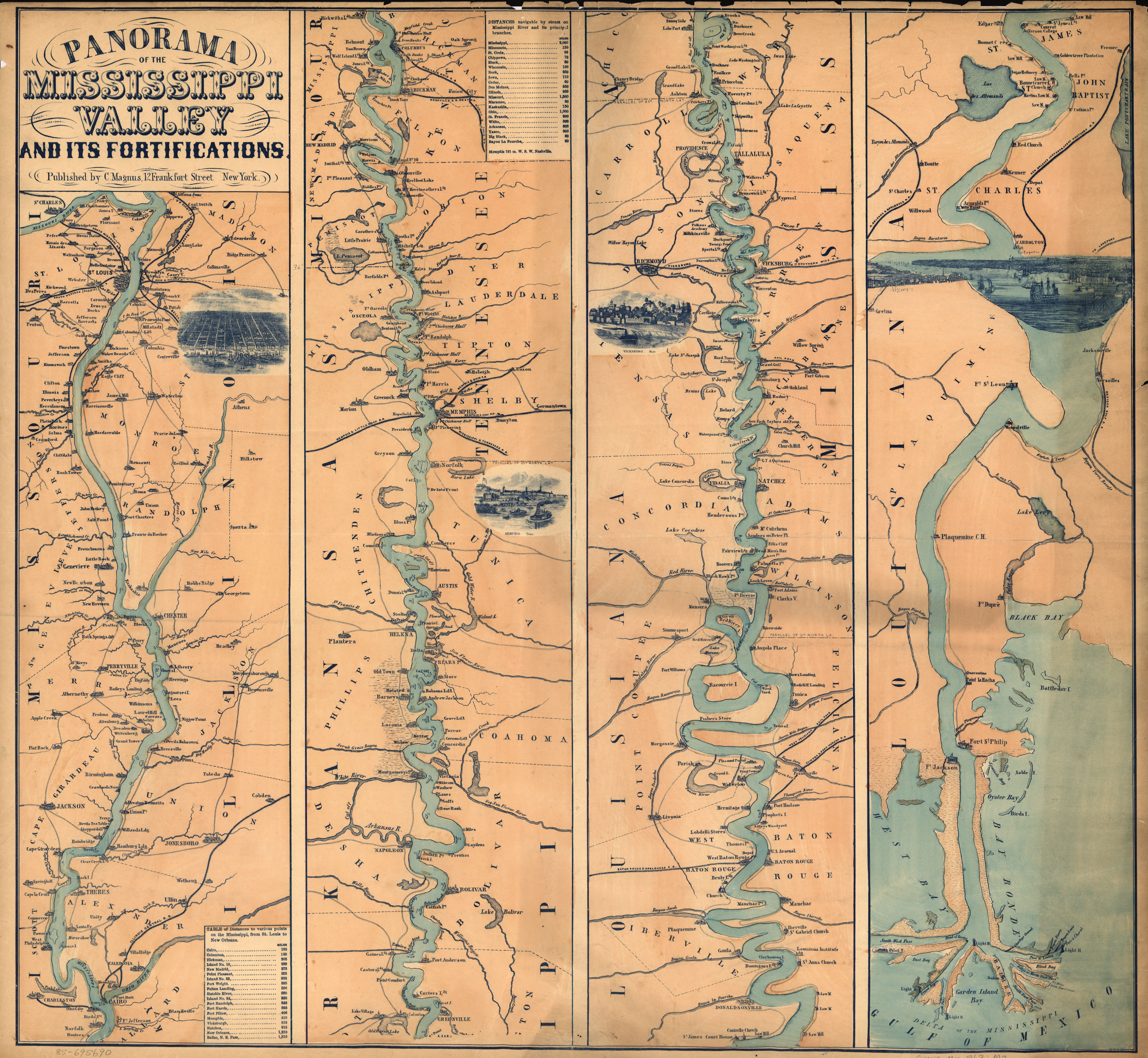
Panorama of the Mississippi Valley - and its fortifications (1863)

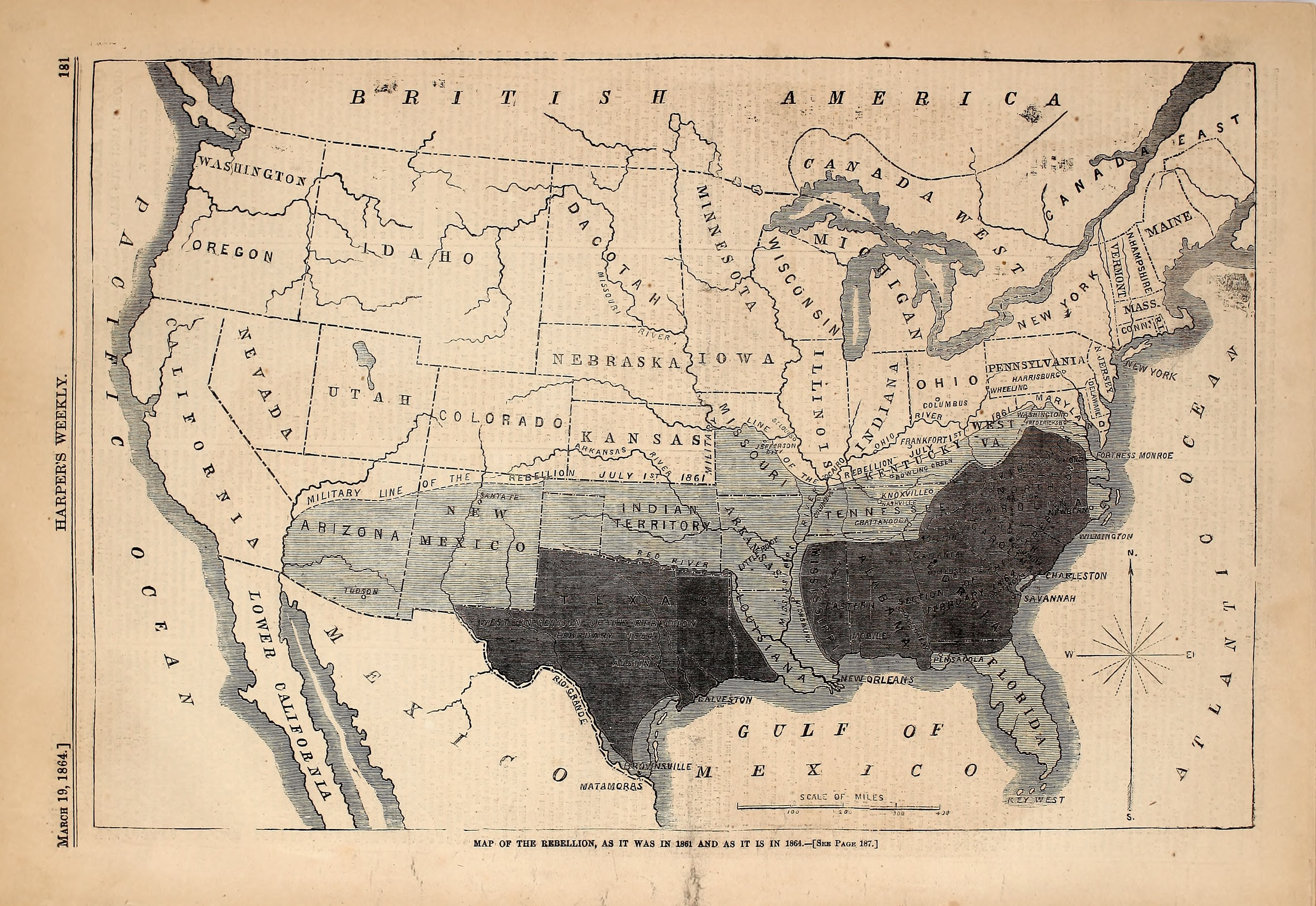
"Map of the rebellion as it was in 1861 and as it is now" depicts the consequences for the Confederacy of the seizure of Memphis in 1862 and the fall of Vicksburg in 1863 (Harper's Weekly, March 19, 1864)

The Mississippi River was an important military highway that bordered ten states, roughly equally divided between Union and Confederate loyalties.

Both sides soon realised that control of the river was a crucial strategic priority. Confederate general Braxton Bragg said "The river is of more importance to us than all the country together." In April 1862, the Union secured two key points, New Orleans at the mouth of the river and a double-bend on the Kentucky-Tennessee line, leaving only the middle section in Confederate hands. When the major river-ports of Memphis and Vicksburg fell (followed automatically by Port Hudson), the liberation of the Mississippi was complete, and Abraham Lincoln declared "The Father of Waters again goes unvexed to the sea."

This split the Confederacy in two, with the western half forced to operate as a separate department, the Trans-Mississippi Theater, greatly inhibiting supplies and communications, and tilting the odds decisively in favor of the Union.

== State loyalties ==
Minnesota, Wisconsin, Iowa and Illinois were solidly pro-Union, despite some "Copperhead" (Peace Democrat) sentiment in the last-named. Missouri was a slave-state, beset with guerrilla fighting throughout the war, with a Confederate government-in-exile. Kentucky, also a slave-state (and Lincoln's birthplace), was briefly claimed by the Confederacy during a short-lived dual government, but never left the Union. Slave-holding Tennessee was Confederate, though the eastern counties harboured much pro-Union sentiment. Arkansas had initially stayed in the Union, but resented Lincoln's demand for troops, and seceded. Mississippi was deeply Confederate, as was Louisiana, though in the latter case, New Orleans came under a Union government within a Confederate state, following the fall of the city in April 1862.

== Plans for control of the river ==
At the outbreak of war, the Union General-in-Chief, Winfield Scott, proposed an advance down the Mississippi that would cut the Confederacy in two, though the necessary rivercraft had yet to be built. Along with the policy of blockading the entire Southern coastline, the plan was derided as the ‘Anaconda’, slowly constricting the life out of the Confederacy. Most Union generals believed that the war could be won quickly by an early march on Richmond, while the commander in the west, General Henry Halleck, considered the Tennessee River to be more significant than the Mississippi. Also Winfield Scott would soon be retiring. Eventually, however, the strengths of the plan were increasingly recognised, and it became Union strategy.

As the Confederate Navy had to build almost its entire fleet from scratch, its operations on the Mississippi would be largely defensive.

== Battles ==
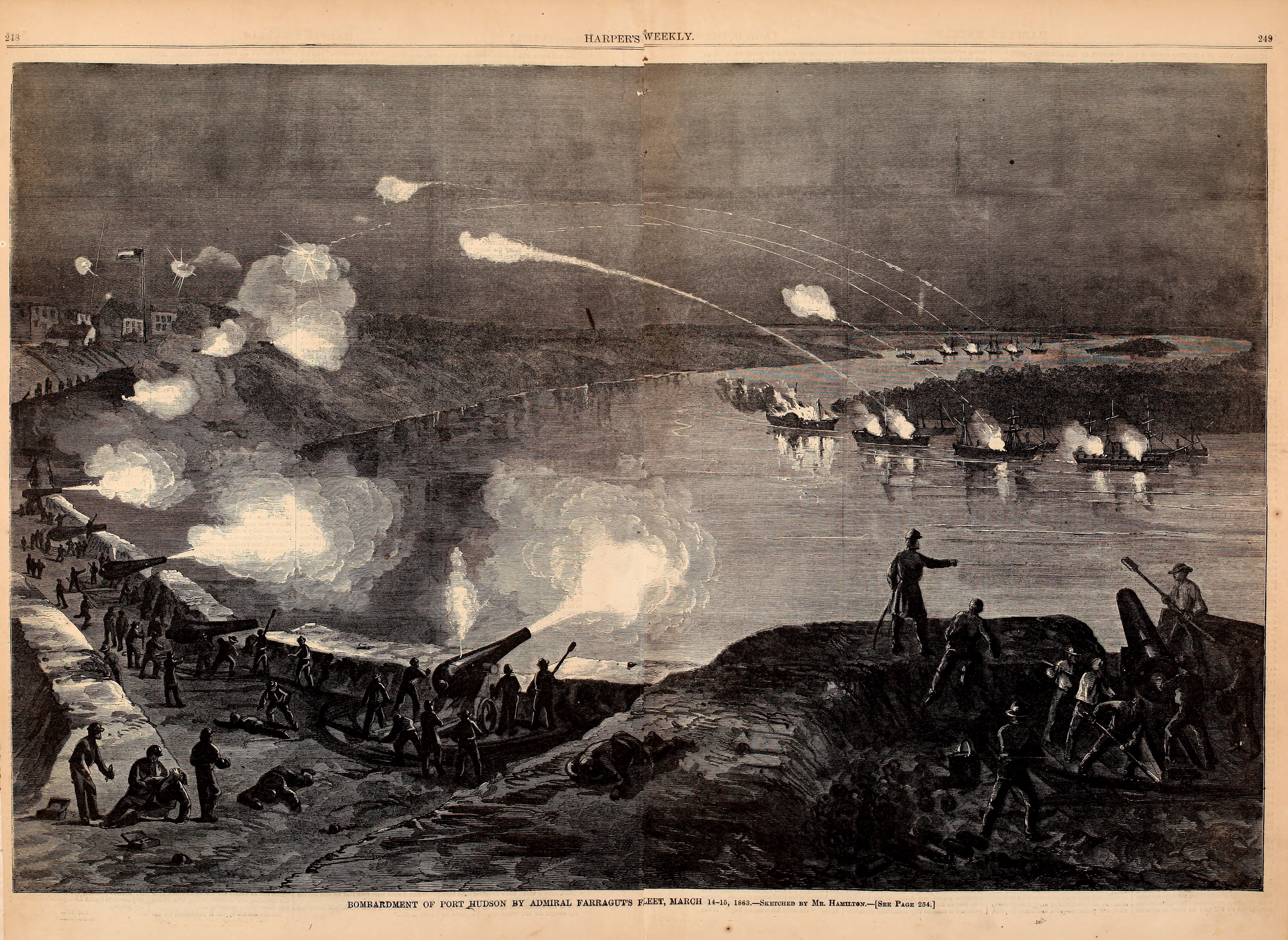
"Bombardment of Port Gibson by Admiral Farragut's Fleet, March 14–15, 1863" (Sketched by Mr Hamilton; Harper's Weekly)

=== New Madrid/Island Number Ten (February 28 – April 8, 1862) ===
The Confederates had fortified a tight double-bend in the river, with garrisons at New Madrid, Missouri, and Island Number Ten. Union Major-General John Pope arrived unexpectedly, before winter was over, easily took New Madrid, and then ordered two gunboats to run the island batteries, covering his crossing to the east (Tennessee) bank, whereupon the outnumbered enemy surrendered.

=== New Orleans (April 16-28, 1862) ===
Captain David Farragut of the Union Navy's West Gulf Blockading Squadron attacked the city's outer fortifications, Fort Jackson and Fort St. Philip, at first obstructed by a defensive boom. When the boom was broken by gunboats, the fleet forced its way in, opposed by ironclads and fire-rafts, eventually enabling the infantry to occupy the city and set up a Union government for the rest of the war.

=== Memphis (June 6, 1862) ===
The Memphis garrison had been much depleted, following the Union capture of the rail junction at Corinth, so the Union fleet was opposed only by Confederate gunboats and rams, poorly equipped, which were destroyed in two hours. One Union boat, Queen of the West, was disabled. The Union forces were able to capture and repair four Confederate craft for their own use.

=== Baton Rouge (August 5, 1862) ===
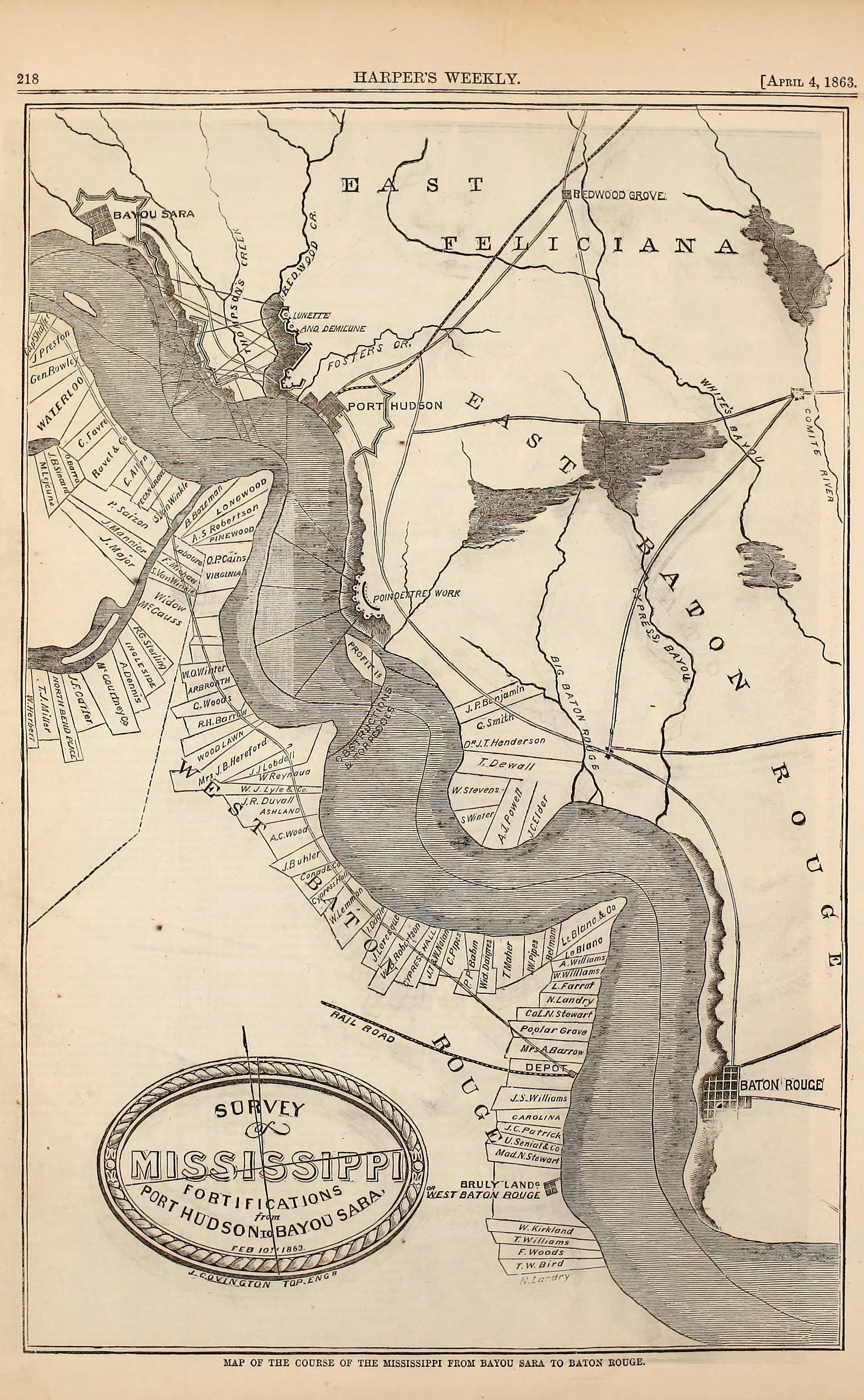
Mississippi Fortifications from Port Hudson to Bayou Sara (1863)

Confederate area commander Earl Van Dorn had been hoping to re-take Louisiana's abandoned state capital Baton Rouge. A force under Maj. Gen. John C. Breckinridge attacked at dawn, killing Union commander Thomas Williams, and driving his men into defensive lines, protected by their gunboats. But the Confederate ram CSS Arkansas had broken down and it became a one-sided naval battle, forcing Breckinridge to withdraw.

=== Vicksburg (December 26, 1862 - July 4, 1863) ===
After several failed initiatives, including an attempt to divert the river itself, General U.S. Grant marched down the west (Louisiana) bank, accompanied by gunboats that managed to run the Vicksburg batteries and ferry his army across to the east bank. From there, he pursued the enemy into their lines and besieged them until they surrendered.

Principal actions:

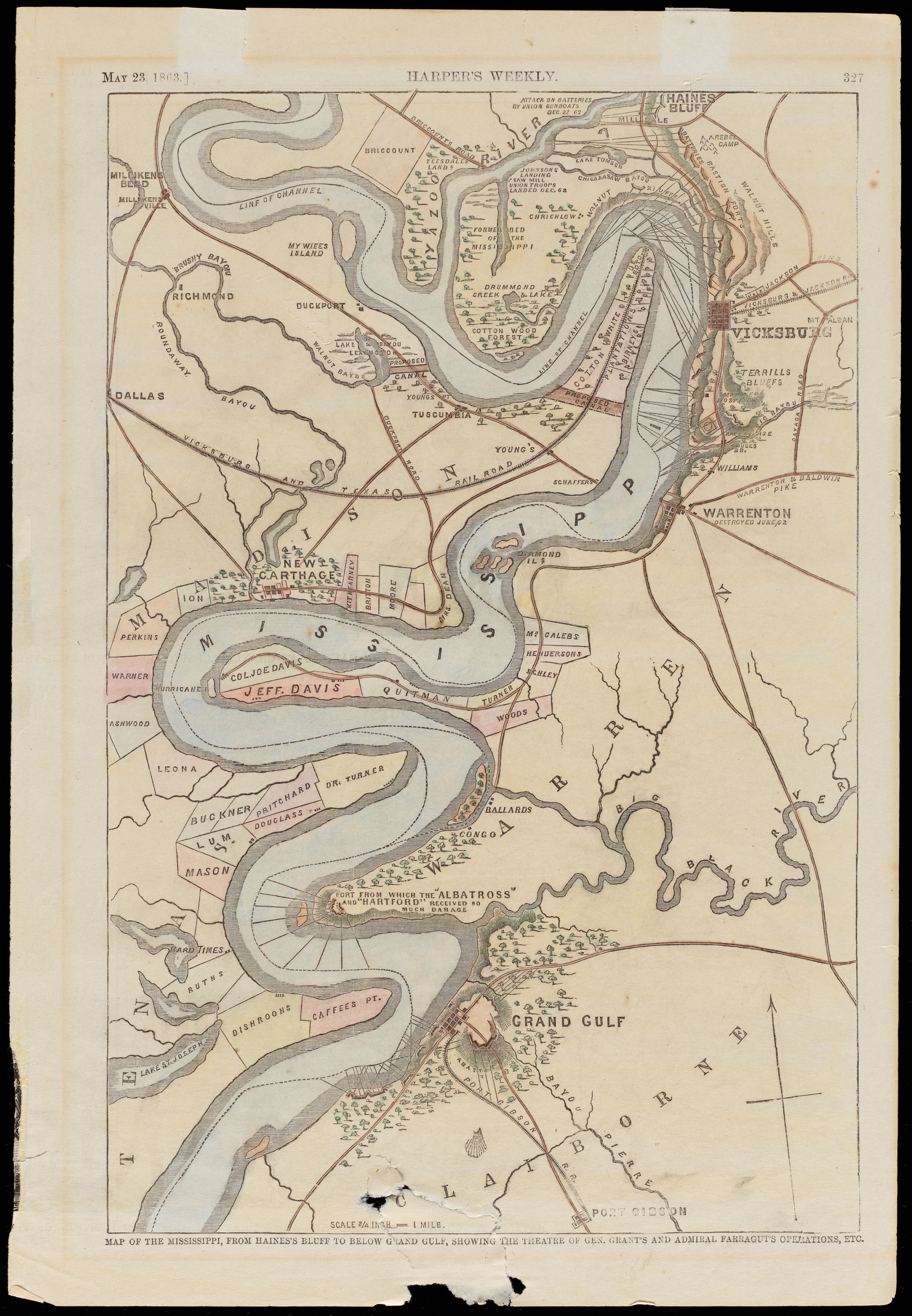
Map of the Mississippi, from Haines' Bluff to below Grand Gulf, showing the theatre of Gen. Grant's and Admiral Farragut's operations, etc.

- Snyder’s Bluff (April 29 – May 1)
Diversionary feint to distract the Confederates from sending support downstream to Grand Gulf. A Union fleet moved up the Yazoo, attracting heavy fire, before retreating through the swampy terrain.

- Port Gibson (May 1)
After crossing to the east bank at Bruinsburg, Grant drove the Confederates back from one defensive position to the next, establishing a beachhead and forcing the enemy to abandon the port of Grand Gulf.

- Jackson (May 14)
Grant’s move on the Mississippi state capital caused Confederate General Joseph E. Johnston to evacuate the city, enabling Grant to destroy its factories and rail communications.

- Champion Hill (May 16)
Seen as the pivotal battle of the campaign. The Confederates occupied a high vantage-point, led by Brig. Gen. Lloyd Tilghman, who died in action, but Grant swept them off the crest.

- Big Black River Bridge (May 17)
Confederates’ last chance to avoid being driven back into their lines. General Pemberton took a position on the river, but was routed by Grant, burning the bridges as he went, but losing many prisoners.

=== Port Hudson (May 22 – July 9, 1863) ===
General Nathaniel Banks had been ordered upstream to aid General U.S. Grant who was besieging Vicksburg. His orders were to capture Port Hudson, the only other remaining Confederate stronghold on the river, but his assault failed, and he settled into a siege - at 48 days, the longest in American history up till then. The eventual Confederate surrender completed the liberation of the river.

== List of locations and landmarks ==
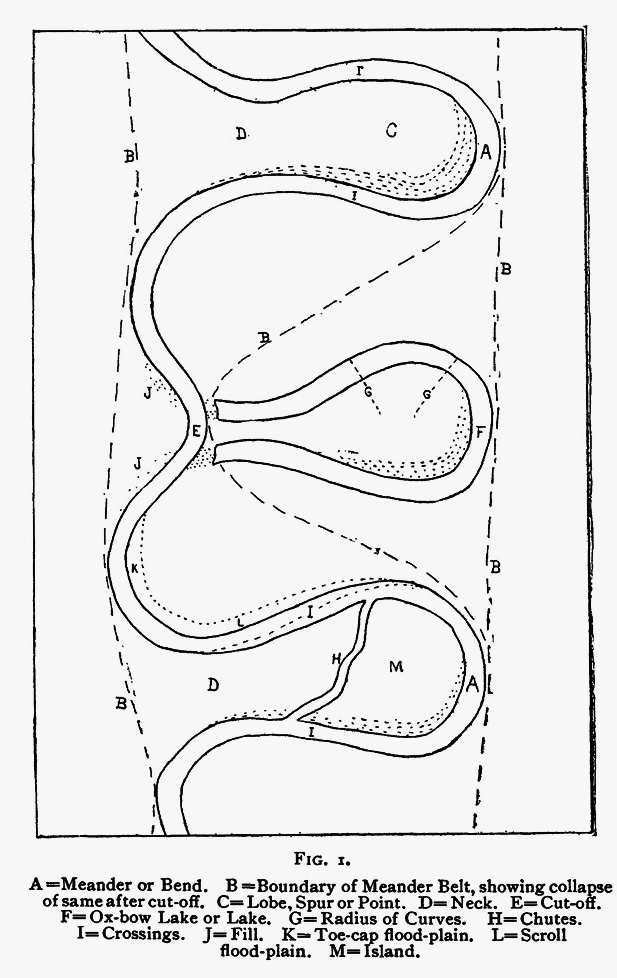
Visual guide to Mississippi River nomenclature

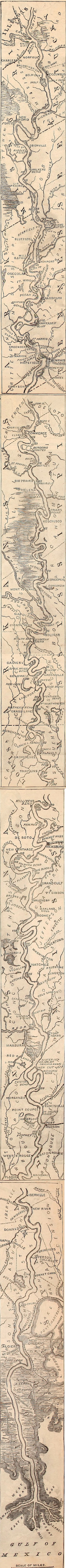
1862 map of the Mississippi published in Harper's Weekly

This is a list of notable places on the Mississippi River between roughly St. Louis, Missouri, and the Gulf of Mexico at the time of the American Civil War, listed from north to south. Where locations are opposite each other at the same point along the river, the westernmost is listed first. Steamboats of the era were fueled by wood (and coal as well) and the wood-fueled steamers burned something like 70 cords of wood per day. Therefore, there were "hundreds of wood yards" along the Mississippi during the steamboat era, "one every several miles on the busiest sections of the river."

- Columbia, Missouri
- Chippewa, Illinois
- Venice, Illinois
- Brooklyn, Illinois
- St. Louis, Missouri
- Illinoistown, Illinois
- Cahokia, Illinois
- Carondolet, Missouri
- Jefferson Barracks
- Columbia, Illinois
- Oakville, Missouri
- Finestown, Missouri
- Jefferson, Missouri
- Kimmswick, Missouri
- Dicksons, Illinois
- Widow Beard's Island
- Smiths, Illinois
- Huger, Illinois
- Clifton, Missouri
- Illinois, Missouri
- Harlow, Illinois
- Peverlys, Missouri
- Harrisonville, Illinois
- Herculaneum, Missouri
- Joachim Creek
- Platin Bock, Missouri
- Selma, Missouri
- Hardscrabble, Illinois
- Cliffdale, Missouri
- Rush Tower, Missouri
- Penitentiary (Illinois)
- Isle du Bois Creek
- Fort de Chartres
- Establishment Creek
- Prairie du Rocher, Illinois
- Frenchmans, Missouri
- Little Rock, Missouri
- Rivière au Vases
- Kaskaskia, Illinois
- St. Mary's Landing, Missouri
- Prattes Landing, Missouri
- Chester, Illinois
- St. Mary's River
- Mancoes, Illinois
- Liberty, Illinois
- St. Omer's Island
- Baileys Landing, Missouri
- Lagoarses Island
- Devil's Bakeoven
- Breesville, Illinois
- Big Muddy River
- Apple Creek
- Birmingham, Missouri
- Crawfords Ferry, Missouri
- Union Point, Illinois
- Devils Tea Table (?!!!)
- Sheppards Landing, Missouri
- Bainbridge, Missouri
- Hamburg Landing, Illinois
- Devil Island
- Clear Creek
- Clear Creek Landing, Missouri
- Cape Girardeau, Missouri
- Rock Island, Illinois
- Cape La Croix, Missouri
- Thebes, Illinois
- Commerce, Missouri
- Santa Fe, Illinois
- Powers Island
- West Philadelphia, Missouri
- Goose Island
- Mound City, Illinois
- Fort Holt
- Cairo, Illinois
- Cairo and Fulton Railroad
- Bird's Point, Missouri
- Fort Jefferson
- Little Mayfield Creek
- Ohio City, Missouri
- Bickwiths Landing, Missouri
- First Chickasaw Bluff
- Mayfield River
- Norfolk, Missouri
- Iron Bank
- Baldwinsville, Missouri
- Columbus, Kentucky
- Belmont, Missouri
- Wolf Landing, Missouri or Wolf Island Landing
- Wolf Island
- St. James, Missouri
- Chalk Bank
- James Landing, Missouri
- Taylor Landing, Kentucky
- Mills Point, Missouri
- Second Chickasaw Bluff
- Little Obion River
- Hickman, Kentucky
- James Bayou
- New Madrid, Missouri
- Smith's Landing, Missouri
- Point Pleasant, Missouri
- Island No. 10
- Obionville, Tennessee
- Donaldson Point
- Island No. 10
- Madrid Bend
- Chepousa Creek
- Smiths Landing
- Point Pleasant, Missouri
- Obionville, Tennessee
- Reelfoot Lake
- Mrs. Merrifeather's Landing
- Cypress Bend
- Riddles Point, Missouri
- Solitude, Missouri
- Gayoso, Missouri
- Walkers Bend
- Little Prairie, Missouri
- Booths Point, Tennessee
- Mitchell Landing
- Reelfoot River
- Cottonwood Point, Missouri
- Bearfield Point
- Dyersburg, Tennessee
- Needham's Cutoff
- Hales Store
- Redfoot River
- Hales Point
- Canadian Reach
- Deer River
- Mill Bayou
- Ashport, Tennessee
- Friendship Bar
- Plum Point
- Osceola, Arkansas
- Fort Wright
- Flour Island
- First Chickasaw Bluff
- Fulton, Tennessee
- Fort Randolph
- Randolph, Tennessee
- Pecan Point
- Second Chickasaw Bluff
- Bentons
- Devils Race
- Third Chickasaw Bluff
- Devil's Elbow
- Oldham, Arkansas
- Fort Harris
- Greenock, Arkansas
- Mound City, Arkansas
- Fort Rectory
- Woppenaughkee Bar
- Paddy's Hen and Chickens
- Fort Pillow
- Hopefield, Arkansas
- Memphis and Arkansas Railroad
- Memphis, Tennessee
- Memphis and Ohio Railroad
- Railroad to Charleston
- Ft. Pickering
- Presidents Island
- Grayson, Arkansas
- Norfolk, Mississippi
- Dark Corner, Mississippi
- Blue Point, Mississippi
- Bledsoe's Landing, Arkansas
- Cow Island
- Cat Island
- Buck Island
- Coldwater River
- Commerce, Mississippi
- Council Bend, Arkansas
- Walnut Bend, Arkansas
- Austin, Mississippi
- Sterling, Arkansas
- Clarks Bar
- Burdows Chutes
- Ship Island
- Battle Island
- St. Francis Island
- St. Francis River
- Big Prairie, Arkansas
- Prairie Island
- Helena, Arkansas
- Delta, Mississippi
- Hunts Bar
- Yazoo Pass
- Horseshoe Bend
- Friars Point, Mississippi
- Kosciusco, Mississippi
- Old Town, Arkansas
- Lavonia, Arkansas
- Laconia, Arkansas
- Barneys, Arkansas
- Concepcion, Mississippi
- Concordia, Mississippi
- Victoria, Mississippi
- Montgomery's Point
- White River
- Monty's Landing, Arkansas
- Arkansas River
- Napoleon, Arkansas
- Prentiss, Mississippi
- Indian Point
- Cypress Bend
- Bolivar, Mississippi
- Willow Bar
- Choctaw Bend
- Williams Bayou
- Masons Bayou
- Gaines Landing, Arkansas
- Greenville, Mississippi and Old Greenville, Mississippi
- Spanish Moss Bend
- Columbia, Arkansas
- Chicot Island
- Point Chicot
- Physic Island
- Lake Village, Arkansas
- Lakeport, Arkansas
- Eggs Bend
- Kentucky Bend
- Point Worthington
- Mathers Bend
- Grand Lake, Arkansas
- Princeton, Mississippi
- Searahs Island
- Bunch's Bend
- Stack Island Reach
- Stack Island
- Talalula, Mississippi
- Providence, Louisiana
- Pecan Grove, Louisiana
- Tompkins, Louisiana
- Milliken's Bend, Louisiana
- Paw Paw Island
- Yazoo River
- Young's Point
- Vicksburg and Shreveport Railroad
- De Soto, Louisiana
- Walnut Hills
- Vicksburg and Jackson Railroad
- Vicksburg, Mississippi
- Warrenton, Mississippi
- Bayou Vidal
- New Carthage, Louisiana
- Palmyra Bend and Palmyra Island
- Point Pleasant
- Big Black Island
- Big Black River
- Grand Gulf, Mississippi
- Railroad to Port Gibson, Mississippi
- Bayou Pierre
- Bruinsburg, Mississippi
- St. Joseph, Louisiana
- Rodney, Mississippi
- St. Joseph, Louisiana
- Coles Creek
- Fairchild Creek and Selsertown, Mississippi
- Rifle Point
- Vidalia, Louisiana
- Natchez, Mississippi
- Natchez Island
- Catherine Creek
- Hutchins Landing, Mississippi
- Glasscock Island
- Ellis Cliff
- Dead Mans Bar
- Deep Bar
- Union Point, Louisiana
- Red River
- Homochitto River
- Fort Adams
- Mansura, Louisiana
- Red River Landing, Louisiana
- Sister Island ("washed away")
- New Cut-Off
- Tunica Bend
- Ragourci Bend
- The Village, Louisiana
- Morganzia, Louisiana
- Bayou Sara
- Point Coupee, Louisiana
- Road to Woodville
- St. Francisville, Louisiana
- Point Coupee Reach
- Waterloo, Louisiana
- Hermitage, Louisiana
- Lake Fausse
- Port Hudson, Louisiana
- Prophet Island (aka Profit Island)
- West Baton Rouge, Louisiana
- Baton Rouge, Louisiana
- Atchafalaya River
- Bruly Landing, Louisiana
- Plaquemine, Louisiana
- Manchac, Louisiana
- Iberville, Louisiana
- Bayou Goule, Louisiana
- Khorassan, Louisiana
- Claiborne Island
- New River, Louisiana
- Bayou Fourche
- Port Barrow, Louisiana
- Donaldsonville, Louisiana
- Bringiers, Louisiana
- Convent, Louisiana
- Jefferson College
- Cantrells, Louisiana
- Edgard, Louisiana
- Bonnet Carre, Louisiana
- Red Church, Louisiana
- Germantown, Louisiana
- Kenner Landing, Louisiana
- Carrollton, Louisiana
- New Orleans and Jackson Railroad
- New Orleans
- New Orleans and Opelousas Railroad
- Lafayette, Louisiana
- Cosmopolite, Louisiana
- McDonough, Louisiana
- Algiers, Louisiana
- Fort Ieon (?)
- English Turn
- Woodville, Louisiana
- Fort St. Philip
- Jackson, Louisiana
- Gulf of Mexico

== See also ==
- Wisconsin in the American Civil War
- Iowa in the American Civil War
- Illinois in the American Civil War
- Missouri in the American Civil War
- Kentucky in the American Civil War
- Tennessee in the American Civil War
- Arkansas in the American Civil War
- Mississippi in the American Civil War
- Louisiana in the American Civil War
