= Brunswick, Mississippi =

- Ghost town
- Location within Mississippi
- Coordinates: 32°33′16″N 91°03′42″W
- Country: United States
- State: Mississippi
- County: Warren
- Elevation: 98 ft (30 m)
- Time zone: UTC-6 (Central (CST))
  - Summer (DST): UTC-5 (CDT)
- GNIS feature ID: 691733

Brunswick is a ghost town in Warren County, Mississippi. Brunswick Landing, north of the community, was located directly on the Mississippi River.

Brunswick originated as a postal village. A steamship delivering mail in 1853 left Memphis, Tennessee, each evening at 8 pm, and traveled south stopping at Grayson, AR, Blues' Point, AR, Commerce, MS, Bledsoe's Landing, AR, Austin, MS, Wayne, AR, Sterling, AR, Helena, AR, Delta, MS, Friars Point, MS, Barneys, AR, Island No. 66, Laconia, AR, Victoria, MS — and arrived at Napoleon, AR at 7 pm the next evening.

The Buena Vista Plantation was located between Brunswick and Eagle Lake to the south. In 1860, the plantation's owner had a levee built using Irish laborers, his own slaves too busy planting cotton.

In 1900, Brunswick had churches, a school, stores, cotton gins, and a population of 100.

The U.S. Army Corps of Engineers began construction in 1934 of the Newman Cutoff, which created Chotard Lake and Albemarle Lake, both oxbow lakes, and removed Brunswick from the contiguous Mississippi River.

Today, the Mississippi Levee lies between Brunswick, now agricultural land, and Brunswick Landing, of which nothing remains.
