= Kienstra, Mississippi =

Kienstra
- Ghost town
- Location within Mississippi
- Coordinates: 31°13′34″N 91°36′21″W
- Country: United States
- State: Mississippi
- County: Adams
- Elevation: 56 ft (17 m)
- Time zone: UTC-6 (Central (CST))
  - Summer (DST): UTC-5 (CDT)
- GNIS feature ID: 691978

Kienstra (also Kienstra Store) is a ghost town located in Adams County, Mississippi, United States. South of the town was Kienstra Landing, located on the Mississippi River.

The community was situated on a barren peninsula called "Jackson Point", at a bend in the river called "Palmetto Bend", named for the palmetto plant which grew abundantly in the hardwood swamps across the river in Louisiana.

Kienstra had a post office from 1871 to 1957. The Morrisana Plantation was located at Kienstra. North of the town, midway to Arnot, was the Kienstra School. The "Kienstra Store Light" was a navigation beacon on the river, located near the landing as early as 1879.

In 1900, Kienstra had a population of 35.
