= Willis Davis (Mississippi politician) =

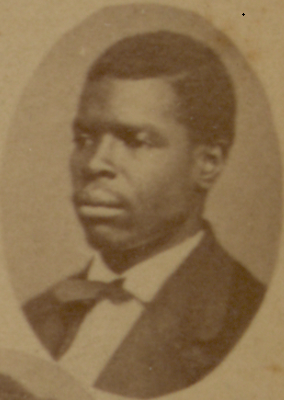

Willis Davis was a state legislator in Mississippi. He served in the Mississippi House of Representatives from 1874 to 1876 from Adams County, Mississippi. He represented Adams County, Mississippi. He was born in Mississippi.l

== See also ==
- African American officeholders from the end of the Civil War until before 1900
