= William W. Hence =

Mississippi state politician (1835–?)

William Washington Hence (born July 1835), was an American justice of the peace and a state legislator in Mississippi. He served in the Mississippi House of Representatives representing Adams County, Mississippi from 1880 to 1882. He was a Republican.

During the American Civil War he served in the U.S. Colored Troops, a Union Army regiment. In 1873, the Natchez Democrat reported that he was a "black Modoc" who lost his campaign for treasurer. Testimony was given that he had been deputy marshal in Natchez.
