= Sibley, Mississippi =

- Unincorporated community
- Hamlet of Sibley
- Location within Mississippi Location within the United States
- Coordinates: 31°22′46″N 91°23′55″W
- Country: United States
- State: Mississippi
- County: Adams
- Elevation: 161 ft (49 m)
- Time zone: UTC-6 (Central (CST))
  - Summer (DST): UTC-5 (CDT)
- ZIP code: 39165
- Area codes: 601 & 769
- GNIS feature ID: 677766

Sibley is an unincorporated community in Adams County, Mississippi, United States. There is a post office located on U.S. Route 61 in Sibley, ZIP code 39165.

== Places ==
The St. Catherine Creek National Wildlife Refuge is located west of Sibley, and the Mazique Archeological Site is located 2.5 mi (4.0 km) north. East of the hamlet are the "Sibley Oil Fields", and to the south is the 80 acres (32 ha) "Plantation Oaks Landfill", opened in 1991.

== Notable people ==
Sibley is the birthplace of brothers Theodis, YZ, and Melwyn Ealey, whose musical achievements are acknowledged on a Mississippi Blues Trail marker in Natchez.

== In popular culture ==
Sibley is mentioned in Peter Orner's award-winning novel Esther Stories.
