= Charles D. Foules =

American state legislator in Mississippi

Charles D. Foules was a state legislator in Mississippi. He represented Adams County, Mississippi, in the Mississippi House of Representatives. He was involved in a legal dispute over an inheritance left to his brother William D. Foules from their father William B. Foules. Their father owned Mandamus plantation.
