= Felix L. Cory =

Mississippi state legislator

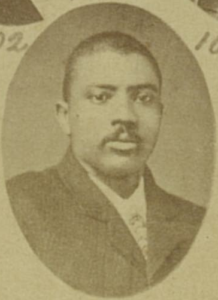

Felix L. Cory was a teacher and state legislator in Mississippi. He represented Adams County, Mississippi in the Mississippi House of Representatives from 1884 to 1886. Chas. D. Foules served with him from the county.

== See also ==
- African American officeholders from the end of the Civil War until before 1900
