= Sand Hill, Mississippi =

Sand Hill, Mississippi may refer to the following places in Mississippi:

- Sand Hill, Attala County, Mississippi, a ghost town
- Sand Hill, Copiah County, Mississippi, an unincorporated community
- Sand Hill, Greene County, Mississippi, an unincorporated community
- Sand Hill, Jones County, Mississippi, an unincorporated community
- Sand Hill, Rankin County, Mississippi, an unincorporated community
