= Middleton, Mississippi =

- Ghost town
- Location within Mississippi Location within the United States
- Coordinates: 33°29′10″N 89°45′03″W
- Country: United States
- State: Mississippi
- County: Montgomery
- Elevation: 436 ft (133 m)
- Time zone: UTC-6 (Central (CST))
  - Summer (DST): UTC-5 (CDT)
- GNIS feature ID: 683319

Middleton is a former town in Montgomery County, Mississippi, United States. Once a thriving commercial and educational center, Middleton was bypassed in 1859 when the Mississippi Central Railway (later Illinois Central) built its line through nearby Winona. Businesses and residents followed the railroad, and Middleton was abandoned. Little remains of the town today but its cemetery, which was restored in 1992 by the Lions Club of Winona.

Originally located in Carroll County, Middleton was one of the earliest settlements in the area. Montgomery County was organized in 1871, and old Middleton was included in its boundaries.

== History ==
The first known European American to settle at this site was Irelton C. DeVane. In 1790 he built a small log store used for trading with the Choctaw, whose territory this was, and with the occasional traveler. Other settlers included William Pace and his wife, who came from Kentucky in the 1820s. Mail was sent from the community by stagecoach as early as 1824.

Following the Treaty of Dancing Rabbit Creek with the United States in 1830, most of the Choctaw from the area were removed to west of the Mississippi River in Indian Territory. Those who remained in the state became state and US citizens.

Many new European-American settlers began to arrive, hungry for land. Some brought enslaved African Americans with them or purchased others as workers. The "Little Log Store", located at the junction of the Carrollton and Shongalo roads, became a well-known trading post.

Several businesses opened during the 1830s, included two general merchandise stores, two doctor's offices, a tavern, a furniture maker, a shoe factory, a large store called "The Big Store", a tailor, and a clock shop. Middleton's businesses were located around a town square. The town's residents established Baptist, Methodist, Presbyterian, and Christian churches.

The town was incorporated in 1837 as "Irwin", but in 1840 its named was changed to Middleton . Unofficial names included "Oxford" and "Bowling Green".

By 1840, Middleton's population had grown to 2,900. A newspaper called The Family Organ began publishing in 1843. Later businesses included The Middleton Hotel, a photographer's shop, a blacksmith shop, a carriage factory, and law offices. Industrial sites were developed along the river for waterpower: on the outskirts of town a wool mill, flour mill, cotton mill, leather tannery, and cotton factory were built. A stage coach ran from Holly Springs to Durant by way of Middleton.

Middleton was one of seven locations selected in 1841 as a possible site for the University of Mississippi, and it was also considered as a site for the Mississippi capital.

The Middleton Cemetery is one of the oldest in the country. It was built with a deep ditch around it resembling a moat. In 1992, the Winona Lion's Club restored the cemetery and many of its markers.

Two well-regarded private schools were established in Middleton. The Judson Institute was a female academy, and The Peoples Academy was a boys school.

In 1859, the Mississippi Central Railway (later Illinois Central) completed a rail line through Winona, located 1.5 mi (2.4 km) east. As a result of being bypassed, Middleton was abandoned in favor of the new railway town of Winona, which was designated as the county seat. Many of Middleton's business and residents relocated there. Some families returned to Tennessee and Kentucky, or moved to nearby Carrollton.

During the Civil War, the town's mills were converted to manufacture products for the Confederate army. Benjamin Grierson and about 1,000 Union soldiers camped near Old Middleton before traveling to nearby Vaiden on January 1, 1863. They plundered the town.
