= Camargo, Mississippi =

- Ghost town
- Location within Mississippi Location within the United States
- Coordinates: 34°04′15.39″N 88°38′55.18″W
- Country: United States
- State: Mississippi
- County: Monroe
- Elevation: 223 ft (68 m)
- GNIS feature ID: 709319

Camargo is a ghost town in Monroe County, Mississippi, United States. Once a thriving river port, Camargo declined following the completion of a nearby railway.

== History ==
Camargo was laid out in 1847, and was named by a veteran of the Mexican–American War, after a war camp near Camargo, Tamaulipas, Mexico. Located on Old Town Creek, it was described as a "flourishing port", with schools, stores, a steamboat landing, a church, post office, cemetery, and Masonic Lodge. The Confederate States Army won a skirmish at Camargo on July 14, 1864.

The Mobile and Ohio Railroad opened about 4 mi (6.4 km) west of Camargo in the late 1840s. A plan to build a railway line from Camargo to the Mobile and Ohio mainline was prepared, and in 1854, the Camargo Branch Railroad Company was established, though the line was never constructed. With the success of the nearby railway, Old Town Creek was neglected and became filled with trees and debris, making it impractical as a transport route. "Under the new conditions of competition the little river ports suffered heavily and tended to dry up", and Camargo was abandoned by the 1870s.
