= Dogtown, Mississippi =

- Ghost town
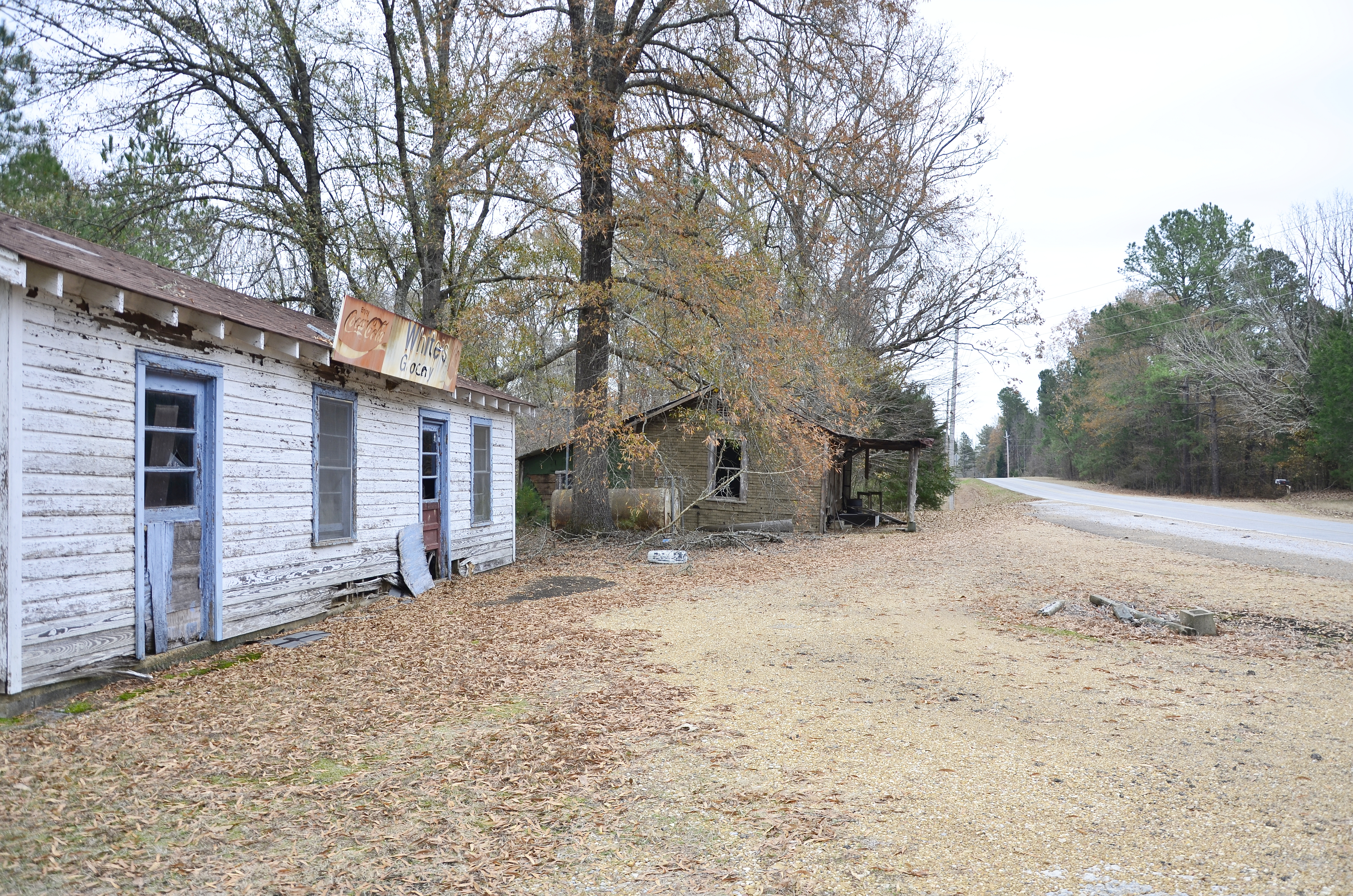
- Abandoned buildings in Dogtown

- Location within Mississippi Location within the United States
- Coordinates: 34°15′53″N 89°17′09″W
- Country: United States
- State: Mississippi
- County: Lafayette
- Elevation: 423 ft (129 m)
- Time zone: UTC-6 (Central (CST))
  - Summer (DST): UTC-5 (CDT)
- Area code: 662
- GNIS feature ID: 693095

Dogtown is a ghost town in Lafayette County, Mississippi, United States, located on Highway 334, 17.6 miles (28.3 km) southeast of Oxford. At one time it was the location of Dogtown School.

All that remains of Dogtown is the abandoned White's Grocery.
