= Adams County Correctional Center =

Federal prison in Mississippi, United States

- Location in Mississippi
- Location: 20 Hobo Fork Road, Natchez, Mississippi, USA; 31°33′24″N 91°13′17″W
- Status: Open
- Capacity: 2260
- Population: 2162 (FY 2026 (YTD))
- Opened: FY 2019
- Former name: Adams County Correctional Center; Adams County Detention Center
- Managed by: CoreCivic
- Warden: Jason Streeval

Adams County Correctional Center (ACCC) is a medium security prison for men located in unincorporated Adams County, Mississippi, near Natchez, It is owned and operated by CoreCivic under contract with U.S. Immigration and Customs Enforcement since 2019. After striking ground in August 2007 at 20 Hobo Fork Road, Adams Correctional Center opened in July 2009 under contract with the Federal Bureau of Prisons.

The facility has a capacity of around 2,260 inmates. Most of its prisoners are illegal immigrants charged with re-entering the United States after a deportation. It currently holds the largest number of illegal migrants of all detention facilities in the United States with an average daily population of 2,154 CoreCivic has owned the prison since 2007; the facility did not open until late in 2009.

According to an FBI affidavit dated to 2012, the majority of those incarcerated were Mexican nationals. The largest group of prisoners were "Paisas", an influential group of Mexican nationals who hold power over the prison population.

== History ==
In May 2012 a riot at the facility claimed the life of Corrections Officer Catlin Hugh Carithers and left sixteen other staff members and three prisoners injured. Twenty-five employees were held hostage during the disturbance, which was ultimately quelled by facility staff with assistance from the Mississippi Highway Patrol and the Federal Bureau of Prisons. According to a company statement, the fatality was the second time an employee had "lost his life to inmate assault."

A federal court affidavit filed by the FBI claims the riots were triggered by protests against the abysmal food and medical care provided at the facility. In January 2017, the last of 23 prisoners who were tried for organizing the May 2010 riot was sentenced to an additional 10 years in prison.

In August 2016, Justice Department officials announced that the FBOP would be phasing out its use of contracted facilities, on the grounds that private prisons provided less safe and less effective services with no substantial cost savings. The agency expects to allow current contracts on its thirteen remaining private facilities to expire.

Average daily population at Adams County Detention Center (Mississippi)
Fiscal year	ADP
FY 2019	109
FY 2020	891
FY 2021	716
FY 2022	830
FY 2023	909
FY 2024	1,536
FY 2025	2,171
FY 2026	2,162

== See also ==
- List of immigrant detention sites in the United States
