= Baleshed, Mississippi =

Unincorporated community in Mississippi, United States

- Ghost town
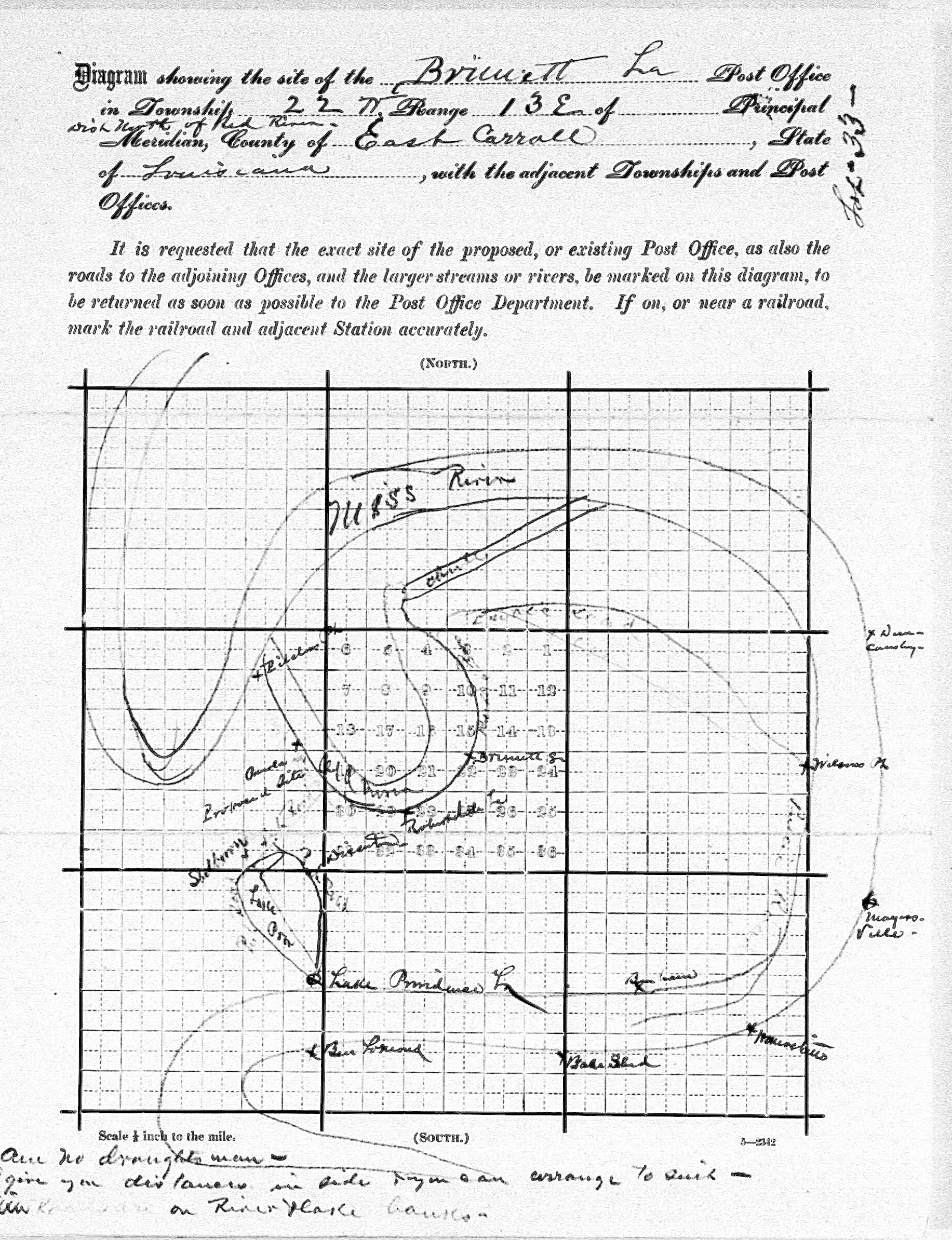
- Locations in East Carroll Parish, Louisiana, and Issaquena County, Mississippi; Baleshed on bottom right

- Location within Mississippi Location within the United States
- Coordinates: 32°50′34″N 91°06′19″W
- Country: United States
- State: Mississippi
- County: Issaquena
- Elevation: 105 ft (32 m)
- Time zone: UTC-6 (Central (CST))
  - Summer (DST): UTC-5 (CDT)
- GNIS feature ID: 711144

Baleshed (also Baleshed Landing and Stack Landing) is a ghost town in Issaquena County, Mississippi, United States. Baleshed was located on the Mississippi River.

Baleshed was established on land which had been granted to Stephen Duncan in 1833. The town was named for a shed located there where bales of cotton were stored prior to shipping.

Baleshed had a post office, and a population of 24 in 1900. The post office operated under the name Baleshed from 1888 to 1917.

In 2000, an extant stone vault used to store money remained there.
