= List of ghost towns in Mississippi =

This is an incomplete list of ghost towns in Mississippi.

- Arcadia
- Arnot
- Artonish
- Baleshed
- Bankston
- Beatties Bluff
- Ben Lomond
- Brewton
- Briers
- Bruinsburg
- Brunswick
- Camargo
- Colony Town
- Commerce
- Concordia
- Cotton Gin Port
- Delta
- Dogtown
- Duncansby
- Eutaw
- Fort Adams
- Gainesville
- Gin
- Grand Gulf
- Gum Ridge
- Holcut
- Holmesville
- Hopewell
- Inwood
- Kienstra
- Logtown
- Middleton
- Midway
- Napoleon
- New Mexico
- Old Town
- Palo Alto
- Peyton
- Pink
- Plymouth
- Port Royal
- Prentiss
- Princeton
- Rocky Springs
- Rodney
- Sand Hill
- Selsertown
- Tocowa
- Trotter Landing
- Uniontown
- Victoria (Bolivar County)
- Westville
- Woolworth
- Wyatt
- Yale
- Zama
