= Eutaw, Mississippi =

- Ghost town
- Location within Mississippi
- Coordinates: 33°39′31″N 91°09′02″W
- Country: United States
- State: Mississippi
- County: Bolivar
- Elevation: 131 ft (40 m)
- Time zone: UTC-6 (Central (CST))
  - Summer (DST): UTC-5 (CDT)
- GNIS feature ID: 669829

Eutaw is a ghost town in Bolivar County, Mississippi, United States. The settlement had a port on the Mississippi River called "Eutaw Landing."

The community was located on the Eutaw Plantation, and included a post office, store, church, and cemetery. A post office operated under the name Eutaw from 1890 to 1952.

The former community is covered by farmfield and a portion of the Mississippi Levee; the only remnant is the Eutaw Cemetery.
