= Colony Town, Mississippi =

- Ghost town
- Location within Mississippi Location within the United States
- Coordinates: 33°27′17″N 90°24′37″W
- Country: United States
- State: Mississippi
- County: Leflore
- Elevation: 138 ft (42 m)
- Time zone: UTC-6 (Central (CST))
  - Summer (DST): UTC-5 (CDT)
- ZIP code: 38941
- Area code: 662
- GNIS feature ID: 668711

Colony Town is a ghost town in Leflore County, Mississippi. Colony Town is approximately 7 miles (11 km) west of Itta Bena and approximately 6 miles (9.7 km) east of Moorhead.

A post office operated under the name Colony Town from 1918 to 1942.
