= Ben Lomond, Mississippi =

Unincorporated community in Mississippi, United States

- Ghost town
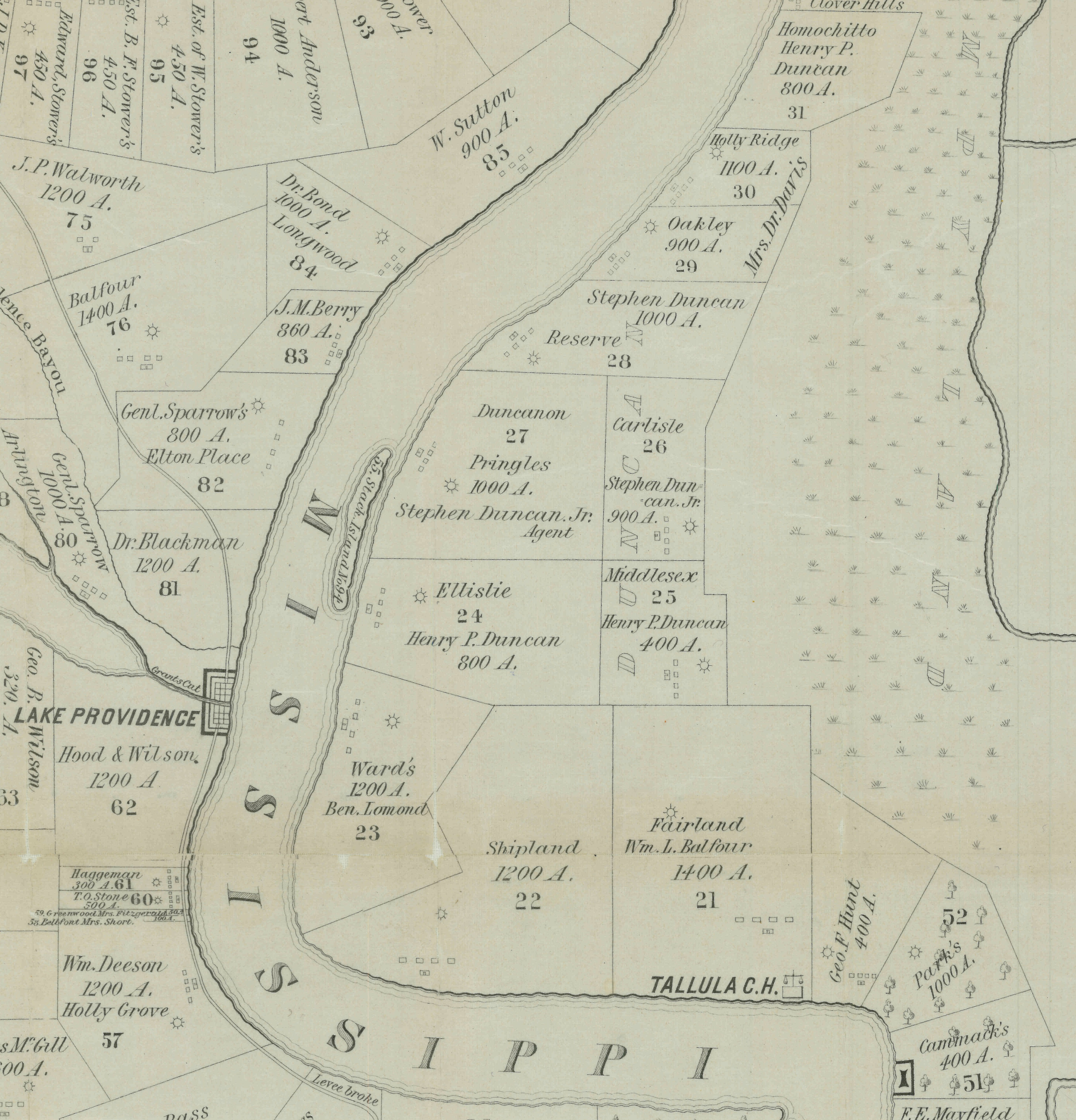
- Ben Lomond and Stephen Duncan plantations in Issaquena County, Mississippi, mapped between 1866 and 1874, probably before 1871

- Location within Mississippi Location within the United States
- Coordinates: 32°48′10″N 91°08′18″W
- Country: United States
- State: Mississippi
- County: Issaquena
- Elevation: 98 ft (30 m)
- Time zone: UTC-6 (Central (CST))
  - Summer (DST): UTC-5 (CDT)
- GNIS feature ID: 711145

Ben Lomond is a ghost town in Issaquena County, Mississippi, United States.

The community originated as a Mississippi River port on the Ben Lomond Plantation, owned by George M. Brown. A gin-house was located near the town.

Ben Lomond had a landing for steamboats and a post office. It was located across the river from Lake Providence, Louisiana. There was a store at Ben Lomond in 1887. Ben Lomond had a population of 26 in 1900. A post office operated under the name Ben Lomond from 1879 to 1913.

The former community is today submerged in the Mississippi River.
