= Isaac N. Selser =

Mississippi state legislator

Isaac N. Selser was a 19th-century state legislator in the United States. He served in the Mississippi House of Representatives from Jefferson County in 1821 and 1823. The Natchez Trace tavern-stand village of Selsertown, Mississippi was named for his family. He married Betsy Montgomery, daughter of Nellie and Samuel Montgomery of Kentucky, in Adams County, Mississippi in 1812, and thus was related by married to judge and lawyer Alexander Montgomery.
