= Briers, Mississippi =

Briers
- Ghost town
- Location within Mississippi
- Coordinates: 31°23′01″N 91°32′00″W
- Country: United States
- State: Mississippi
- County: Adams
- Elevation: 62 ft (19 m)
- Time zone: UTC-6 (Central (CST))
  - Summer (DST): UTC-5 (CDT)
- GNIS feature ID: 685916

Briers is a ghost town located in Adams County, Mississippi, United States. Briar Landing (also Briers Landing) was its port, located directly on the Mississippi River.

Briers had a post office from 1892 to 1923.

Briers was located on a stretch of the river called "Deer Park Bend". In 1933, the U.S. Army Corps of Engineers constructed the "Glasscock Cutoff", which removed Briers from the contiguous flow of the Mississippi River.

All that remains at the hamlet's former location is an abandoned landing strip for light aircraft.
