= Morgantown, Adams County, Mississippi =

Morgantown, Mississippi
- Census-designated place
- Morgantown
- Location within Mississippi
- Coordinates: 31°34′26″N 91°20′50″W
- Country: United States
- State: Mississippi
- County: Adams

Area
  - Total: 0.81 sq mi (2.1 km^{2})
  - Land: 0.81 sq mi (2.1 km^{2})
  - Water: 0 sq mi (0 km^{2})
- Elevation: 200 ft (61 m)

Population (2020)
  - Total: 1,334
  - Density: 1,600/sq mi (640/km^{2})
- Time zone: UTC-6 (Central (CST))
  - Summer (DST): UTC-5 (CDT)
- GNIS feature ID: 673813

Morgantown is a census-designated place (CDP) in Adams County, Mississippi, United States, located to the northeast of the city of Natchez. As of the 2020 census, it had a population of 1,334.

The community is located 4 miles (6 km) east of downtown Natchez, slightly north of U.S. Route 84, and is centered on Morgantown Road. According to the U.S. Census Bureau, it has an area of 0.81 square miles (2.1 km^{2}), all land.

== Demographics ==
Historical population
Census	Pop.	Note	%±
2010	1,412		—
2020	1,334		−5.5%
U.S. Decennial Census; 2010 2020

Morgantown first appeared as a census designated place in the 2010 U.S. census.

=== Racial and ethnic composition ===
Morgantown CDP, Mississippi – Racial and ethnic composition Note: the US Census treats Hispanic/Latino as an ethnic category. This table excludes Latinos from the racial categories and assigns them to a separate category. Hispanics/Latinos may be of any race.
Race / Ethnicity (NH = Non-Hispanic)	Pop 2010	Pop 2020	% 2010	% 2020
White alone (NH)	520	365	36.83%	27.36%
Black or African American alone (NH)	828	931	58.64%	69.79%
Native American or Alaska Native alone (NH)	10	3	0.71%	0.22%
Asian alone (NH)	8	2	0.57%	0.15%
Native Hawaiian or Pacific Islander alone (NH)	0	0	0.00%	0.00%
Other race alone (NH)	1	0	0.07%	0.00%
Mixed race or Multiracial (NH)	10	15	0.71%	1.12%
Hispanic or Latino (any race)	35	18	2.48%	1.35%
Total	1,412	1,334	100.00%	100.00%
