= Selsertown, Mississippi =

Extinct settlement, Natchez Trace

Selsertown
- Ghost town
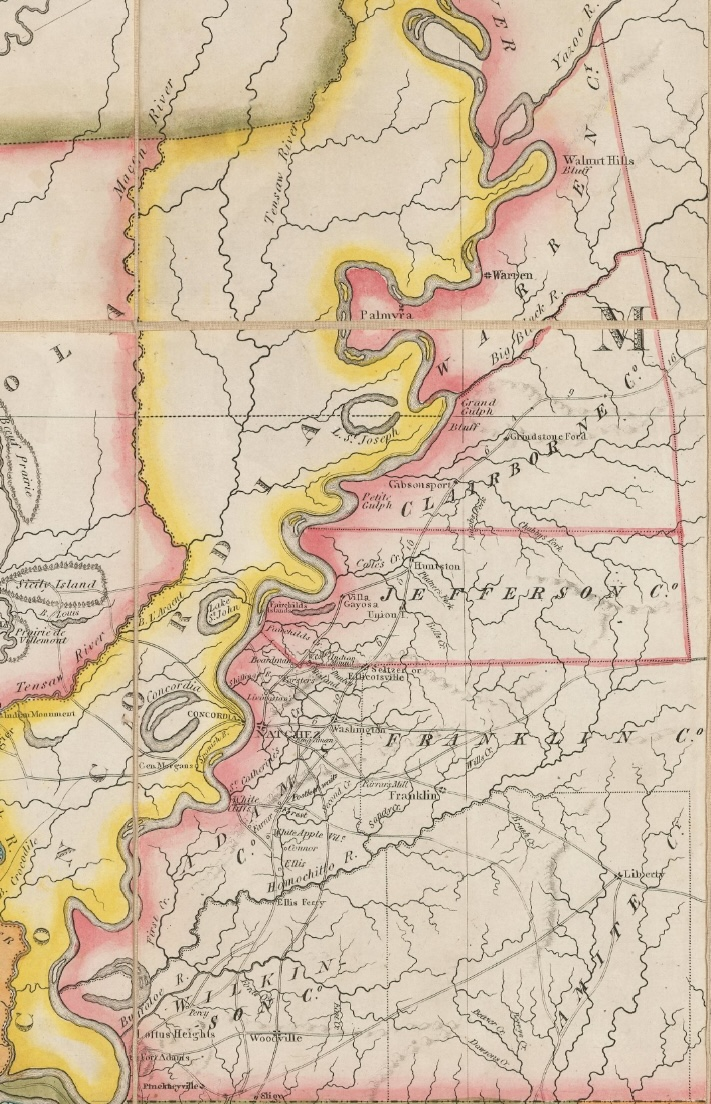
- "Seltzer or Ellicotsville" c. 1816

- Location within Mississippi
- Coordinates: 31°37′41″N 91°14′10″W
- Country: United States
- State: Mississippi
- County: Adams
- Elevation: 400 ft (122 m)
- Time zone: UTC-6 (Central (CST))
  - Summer (DST): UTC-5 (CDT)
- GNIS feature ID: 686071

Selsertown is a ghost town in Adams County, Mississippi, United States.

== Pre-colonization ==
A Plaquemine culture platform mound is located there, once known as the Selsertown Mound but currently known as Emerald Mound. The mound is 35 feet (11 m) in height, with two secondary mounds at either end of its summit that rise even higher. It once had a total of six to eight mounds on its summit but only the two on the ends have survived. It covers 6 acres (2.4 ha). It was described as being of "extraordinary size" in the 1848 book Ancient Monuments of the Mississippi Valley and it is the second-largest Pre-Columbian earthwork in the United States, after Monk's Mound at Cahokia, Illinois. The mound dates from the period between 1200 and 1730 CE and is the type site for the Emerald Phase (1500 to 1680 CE) of the Natchez Bluffs Plaquemine culture chronology. It was still in use by their descendants, the historic era Natchez people, as their main ceremonial center. Emerald was abandoned by the time of the French colonial period, and the hereditary chief of the Natchez had his capital at the nearby Grand Village Site. This settlement was one of the last active expressions of the platform mound building culture along the Mississippi River. The village Jenzenaque was located in the vicinity.

== Ellicotville ==
Early names for Seslertown that referred to American surveyor Andrew Ellicott included Ellicott's Spring, Ellicotville or Ellicottville. The dividing line for the earliest subdivision of Mississippi Territory, Adams and Pickering counties, ran through Ellicottville. The first Methodist service in Jefferson County was conducted by Tobias Gibson at the home of John Griffing at Selsertown in 1798. The settlement was a slave market of the Natchez District by the time Mississippi became a U.S. territory.

This name was most commonly in use during the first decade of the 1800s. The National Intelligencer of Washington, D.C. reported that Governor W. C. C. Claiborne was hosted at a "sumptuous dinner" put on by militia officers and "several respectable citizens of Jefferson County" at which toasts were made to Thomas Jefferson himself, the Congress, and "The COMMERCE of the MISSISSIPPI, and DESTRUCTION TO THE POWER THAT MOLESTS IT," and to "The farmers of the Miffiflippi territory—we venerate the plough."

It is said that the first cotton gin in the Natchez District stood at Selsertown: "The early gins were indeed simple, a small set of rollers operated by two boys, one who turned the crank and the other who fed the cotton. Later, treadle power was added and only person was needed to do the work." The Ellicotville cotton gin and mill was listed for sale in 1813, and notice was published in 1815 that the refurbished gin had reopened for business.

== Natchez Trace ==
Selsertown was the third stop on the Old Natchez Road. Beginning in Natchez, the road traveled northeast through Washington, Selsertown, Uniontown, and many other communities until it ended in Nashville, Tennessee. The United States required jurisdictions through which the Trace passed to commit to development of a tavern or inn every six miles on the trace. George Selser built an inn at this site, which opened in 1780. A British traveler named Francis Bailey stayed at "Seltzer's tavern" in July 1797, recording in his journal, "We found there was no beef to be got in the place; but our host obliged us by killing an ox on purpose for us, which he dried and prepared fit for packing. We stood in want also of biscuit, which we could not readily procure here. There was only one man who knew how to make it, and that was a baker in the fort, who was a Spaniard, to him we applied, and after a good deal of entreaty (for he was obliged to do it clandestinely) he made us a quarter of a hundredweight. Here we got our horses fresh shod, and likewise had some iron hobbles made for them, to prevent their being stolen by the Indians." In 1808 there were three taverns in Seltsertown, and seven other buildings. A man named Isaac N. Selser represented Jefferson County in the Mississippi House of Representatives in 1821 and 1823. The Selsers were from Pennsylvania and intermarried with the Montgomerys who intermarried with the Crocketts and who came from the Carolinas to the Natchez District around 1803 and produced judge Alexander Montgomery.

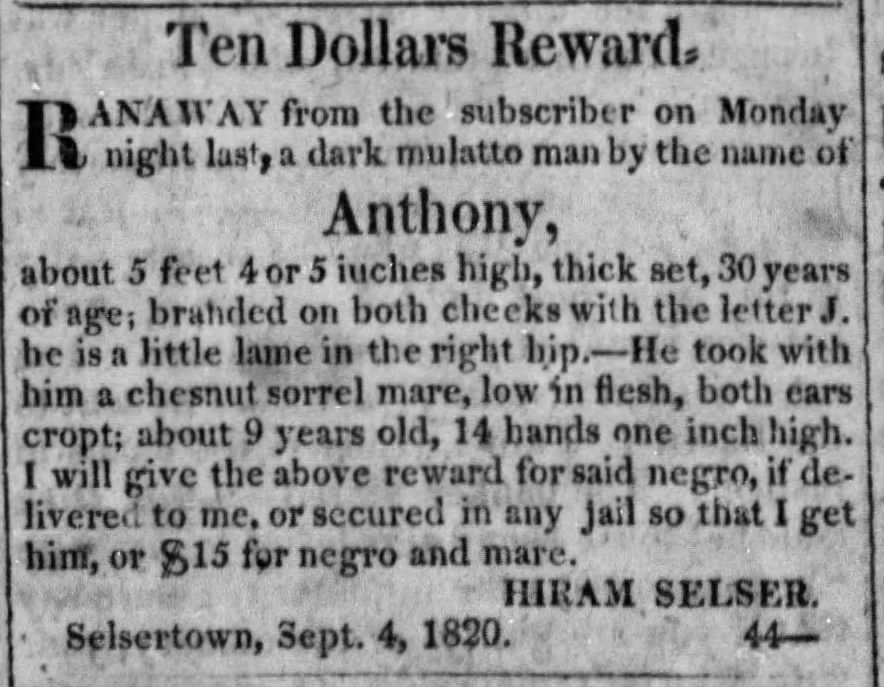
"Ten Dollars Reward" Mississippi Free Trader, October 17, 1820

John McCullum eventually became the owner of the inn. A sign outside of the inn, while owned by McCullum, read "Intertainment for Man and Baste." The inn caught fire and was destroyed during the American Civil War.

There was a "slave-trading block until the War Between the States."

By the late 19th century, "Selsertown was represented by a frail tenement occupied by an old colored woman who dispensed fried bacon, eggs and corn bread to the hungry wayfarer."
