= Woolworth, Mississippi =

- Ghost town
- Location within Mississippi Location within the United States
- Coordinates: 31°38′00″N 90°16′24″W
- Country: United States
- State: Mississippi
- County: Lincoln
- Elevation: 330 ft (100 m)
- Time zone: UTC-6 (Central (CST))
  - Summer (DST): UTC-5 (CDT)
- GNIS feature ID: 692332

Woolworth is a ghost town located in rural northeast Lincoln County, Mississippi, United States.

== History ==
Woolworth was a stop on the Mississippi Central Railroad (1897–1967) in the early 1900s, constructed between Brookhaven to the west and Silver Creek to the east.

Woolworth never incorporated, and never had a post office.

Woolworth had a train depot, and a 48-car rail siding.

== Decline ==
With the rise of automobiles, roads were built which bypassed Woolworth. The town's sawmill closed, and the train stopped running. The only visible remains of Woolworth are the old general store and the old blacksmith shop, both next to the train tracks on the east side of the road. They are currently used for storage by the owner of the property.

Two houses were built after the town's prosperity ended. The house just north of the train tracks was built by the owner of the old sawmill, and was lived in until the 1980s. The house south of the train tracks was built from wood reclaimed from the old train depot, and was later moved to its current location. The floor beams supporting the house were former ceiling beams from an old school in the community of Heucks Retreat, located west of Woolworth.
