= Trotter Landing, Mississippi =

- Ghost town
- Location within Mississippi
- Coordinates: 34°32′37″N 90°31′59″W
- Country: United States
- State: Mississippi
- County: Tunica
- Elevation: 157 ft (48 m)
- Time zone: UTC-6 (Central (CST))
  - Summer (DST): UTC-5 (CDT)
- GNIS feature ID: 692276

Trotter Landing (also Trotter's Landing) is a ghost town in Tunica County, Mississippi, United States.

Once an important port on the Mississippi River, nothing remains of the original settlement.

== History ==
The town was founded in 1820 by C. L. Moore, who operated a ferry to Helena, Arkansas, located on the opposite side of the river. The site was called "Glendale Landing" until 1846, when Captain John Trotter bought land there and changed the name to "Trotter's Landing".

Trotter Landing was a busy riverport where agricultural products were produced and transported downriver. The town's importance, however, did not grow beyond that of a riverport.

In 1870, the Ohio Statesman reported that the steamboat Kenton, traveling from Cincinnati to New Orleans, struck a snag at Trotter Landing and was lying on its side on the river bank. The steamer was "probably a total loss".

Trotter Landing was the terminus of a branch of the now-abandoned Mobile & North Western Railroad, constructed in the 1870s. The line traveled west to Trotter Landing from Lula, Mississippi.

The 1910 Glidden Tour—an annual cross-county driving event sponsored by the American Automobile Association—crossed the "Father of Waters" at Trotter Landing. The Board of Trade in Helena sent large barges to the town to carry all the vehicles, and a portion of the levee had to be temporarily cut away.

In 1915, the ferry from Trotter Landing to Helena was included as part of the route of the Southern National Highway.

== Decline ==
Factors contributing to the demise of Trotter Landing's included the widespread construction of railways following the American Civil War, which greatly reduced the reliance on the Mississippi River as a method of transportation. The need for ferry crossings on the river was also impacted by bridge construction, such as the Frisco Bridge in nearby Memphis, opened in 1892. The Mississippi River, moreover, changed course and moved west of the Trotter Landing, leaving the town some distance inland from the river.

== Today ==
Trotter Landing is significant to canoeists and paddlers on the Mississippi River. The town was located at the entrance to "Old River Chute", a historic oxbow lake described as "a primeval world", accessible by a small watercraft from the Mississippi River.
