= Gin, Mississippi =

- Ghost town
- Location within Mississippi
- Coordinates: 31°54′57″N 88°37′50″W
- Country: United States
- State: Mississippi
- County: Clarke
- Elevation: 322 ft (98 m)
- Time zone: UTC-6 (Central (CST))
  - Summer (DST): UTC-5 (CDT)
- GNIS feature ID: 687514

Gin is a ghost town in Clarke County, Mississippi, United States. A post office operated under the name Gin from 1905 to 1913.
