= Victoria, Bolivar County, Mississippi =

Victoria, Mississippi
- Ghost town
- Location within Mississippi
- Coordinates: 33°55′42″N 91°00′02″W
- Country: United States
- State: Mississippi
- County: Bolivar
- Time zone: UTC-6 (Central (CST))
  - Summer (DST): UTC-5 (CDT)

Victoria is a ghost town in Bolivar County, Mississippi, United States.

Victoria was a historic port on the Mississippi River, located south of Lake Concordia, approximately 3.8 mi (6.1 km) west of Gunnison.

A bend in the Mississippi River at the location of the settlement was named "Victoria Bend", and continues to be known thus. Nothing remains of the settlement, as "changes in the river's course doomed the village to extinction".

== History ==
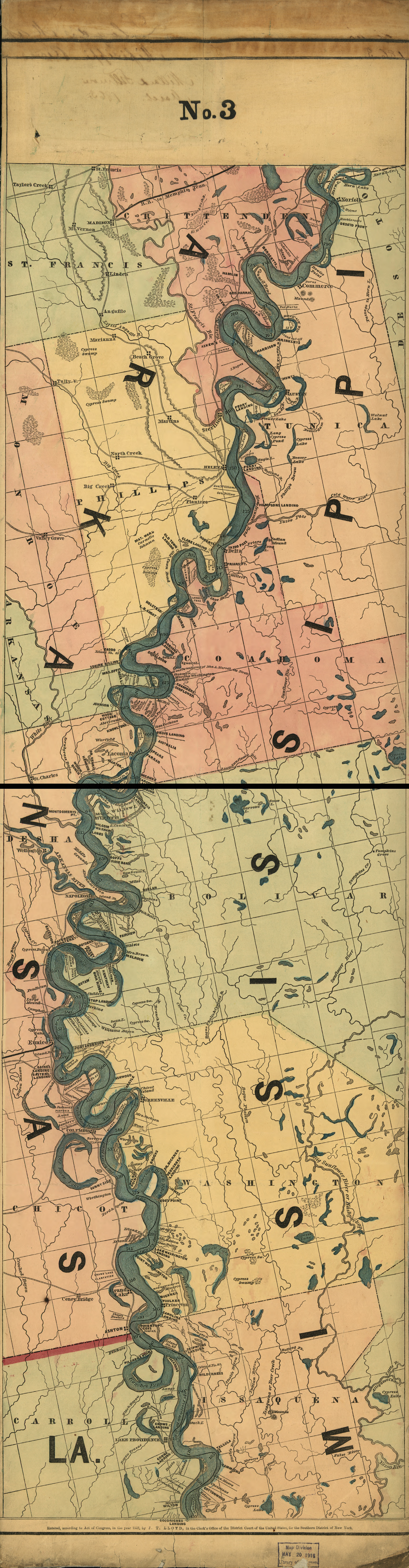
1862 map

Victoria had mail delivery from 1840 to 1871. A mail route described in official documents in 1841 included—from south to north—the Mississippi River ports of Vicksburg, Nine Mile Reach, Princeton, Egg Point (west of present-day Avon), Bachelor's Bend (south of Greenville), Bolivar, Victoria, Port Royal, Delta, Commerce, and Memphis. A mail route from Victoria east to Locopolis (now a ghost town west of Cowart) was also documented.

The settlement had a tavern in 1840.

Harriet Beecher Stowe included an advertisement published in the Jefferson Inquirer in 1852 in her book A Key to Uncle Tom's Cabin:

ONE HUNDRED DOLLARS REWARD

RAN AWAY from my plantation, in Bolivar County, Miss., a negro man named MAY, aged 40 years, 5 feet 10 or 11 inches high, copper coloured, and very straight; his front teeth are good and stand a little open; stout through the shoulders, and has some scars on his back that show above the skin plain, caused by the whip; he frequently hiccups when eating, if he has not got water handy; he was pursued into Ozark County, Mo., and there left. I will give the above reward for his confinement in jail, so that I can get him.

JAMES H. COUSAR, Victoria, Bolivar County, Mississippi.

Stowe added: "delightful master to go back to, this man must be!"

A publication listing game and fish resorts in Mississippi published in 1878 wrote:

This county abounds in deer, bears, wild turkeys, ducks, geese, quail, squirrels and other kinds of large and small game. Take Mississippi River Steamer to Bolivar, Victoria or Concordia, thence strike inland. Guides and all necessary information will be found at any of these places.

A road at the former settlement is today called "Victoria Hunting Club Road".
