= Inwood, Mississippi =

Inwood
- Ghost town
- Location within Mississippi
- Coordinates: 33°30′21″N 90°31′29″W
- Country: United States
- State: Mississippi
- County: Sunflower
- Elevation: 131 ft (40 m)
- Time zone: UTC-6 (Central (CST))
  - Summer (DST): UTC-5 (CDT)
- ZIP code: 38778
- Area code: 662
- GNIS feature ID: 691960

Inwood is a ghost town located in Sunflower County, Mississippi, on Mississippi Highway 3.

Inwood was a station on the Yazoo Delta Railroad (the "Yellow Dog"), established between Moorhead and Ruleville during the 1890s.
