= Arcadia, Mississippi =

Unincorporated community in Mississippi, United States

- Ghost town
- Location within Mississippi Location within the United States
- Coordinates: 32°38′55″N 91°07′32″W
- Country: United States
- State: Mississippi
- County: Issaquena
- Elevation: 82 ft (25 m)
- Time zone: UTC-6 (Central (CST))
  - Summer (DST): UTC-5 (CDT)
- GNIS feature ID: 687578

Arcadia is a ghost town in Issaquena County, Mississippi, United States.

Arcadia was a postal town located on the Mississippi River. It had a population of 45 in 1900.

A post office operated under the name Arcadia from 1882 to 1919.

The former community is today called "Arcadia Point", and is located on the east side of an uninhabited island within the Mississippi River.
