= Cranfield, Mississippi =

- Unincorporated community
- Location within Mississippi Location within the United States
- Coordinates: 31°32′39″N 91°12′21″W
- Country: United States
- State: Mississippi
- County: Adams
- Elevation: 384 ft (117 m)
- Time zone: UTC-6 (Central (CST))
  - Summer (DST): UTC-5 (CDT)
- GNIS feature ID: 693005

Cranfield is an unincorporated community in Adams County, Mississippi, United States.

== History ==
Cranfield is located on the former Mississippi Central Railroad. The community is named for J. D. Cranfield, who donated the original right of way when the railroad was built. A post office operated under the name Cranfield from 1906 to 1921.

The Cranfield Oil Field is located in Cranfield and was first discovered in 1943. In its first three years, the oil field produced 4.8 million barrels of oil.

On September 20, 2013, an F1 tornado struck Cranfield. The tornado downed a couple dozen trees.
