= Gum Ridge, Mississippi =

- Ghost town
- Location within Mississippi Location within the United States
- Coordinates: 31°47′01″N 91°14′40″W
- Country: United States
- State: Mississippi
- County: Jefferson
- Elevation: 69 ft (21 m)
- Time zone: UTC-6 (Central (CST))
  - Summer (DST): UTC-5 (CDT)
- GNIS feature ID: 707694

Gum Ridge is a ghost town in Jefferson County, Mississippi.

Gum Ridge was located at the eastern end of a bend in the Mississippi River, at the mouth of Coles Creek.

A post office was established in 1875, and the hamlet was included on Mississippi River postal routes.

The river changed course in 1884 and began to flow along the "Waterproof Cutoff", named for nearby Waterproof, Louisiana. Gum Ridge had been removed from the contiguous Mississippi River, and the former bend in the river filled in.

In 1900, Gum Ridge had a population of 29.

Aboriginal artifacts, particularly a celt and a sandstone pipe, have been found at Gum Ridge.
