= Brewton, Mississippi =

- Ghost town
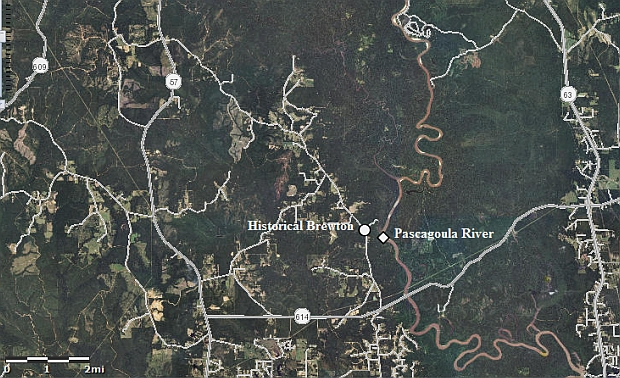
- Historical Brewton was located just west of the Pascagoula River

- Location within Mississippi Location within the United States
- Coordinates: 30°38′01″N 88°39′30″W
- Country: United States
- State: Mississippi
- County: Jackson
- Elevation: 135 ft (41 m)
- Time zone: UTC-6 (Central (CST))
  - Summer (DST): UTC-5 (CDT)
- GNIS feature ID: 710402

Brewton, Mississippi is a ghost town in Jackson County, Mississippi, United States.

== History ==
In the early 19th century, settlers were attracted to Brewer's Bluff (Brewton) in Jackson County because of its high elevation, just west of the Pascagoula River. The name was derived from a Brewer family that obtained the property through a Spanish land grant.

In 1816, Brewer's Bluff was selected as the county seat of Jackson County, with construction of a courthouse and jail around 1820. By 1826, Brewer's Bluff had not met expectations because of its remote location, and the county seat was moved east of the Pascagoula River.

Over the years, Brewer's Bluff passed through several owners and became known as Rice's Bluff, where a turpentine still operated just before the American Civil War.

In the late 19th century, Brewton prospered as a sawmill town, where trees were harvested from the virgin pine forests and processed into lumber. Besides the sawmill, Brewton had houses, a church, a school, a hotel, and a post office. Owners of the sawmill selected the name Klondike in hopes of improving their fortune, but the name did not stick. Ownership of the sawmill changed several times, but bad luck plagued the mill and it burned twice. Once the virgin timber was gone, residents of Brewton had no reason to stay.

Early in the 20th century, the L.N. Dantzler Lumber Company acquired the property. It abandoned the other structures, which had been part of Brewton, and they collapsed from disrepair. The name was changed once again and the area became known as White's Camp.
