= Pink, Mississippi =

- Ghost town
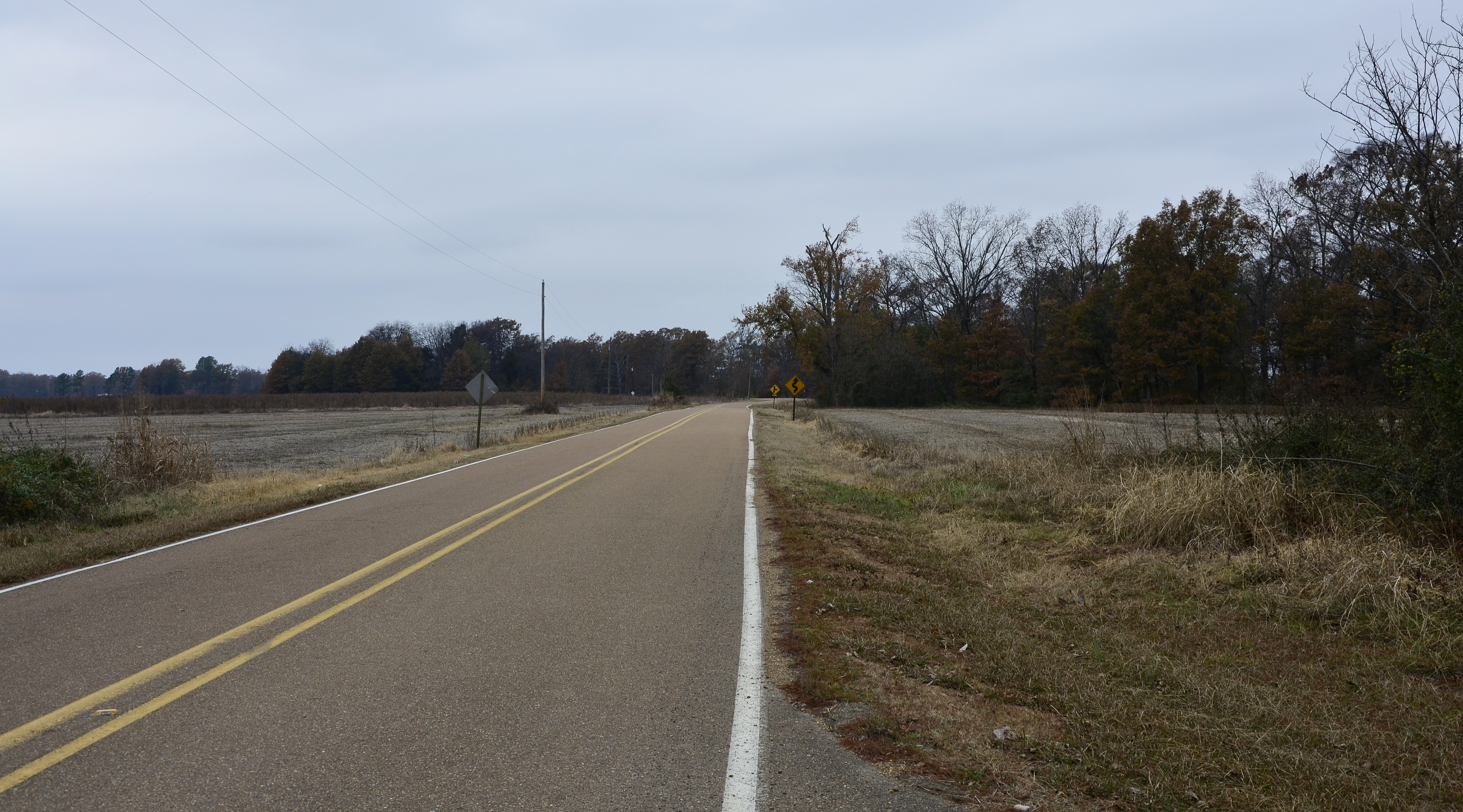
- Pink in 2013

- Location within Mississippi
- Coordinates: 34°33′20″N 90°18′16″W
- Country: United States
- State: Mississippi
- County: Tunica
- Elevation: 174 ft (53 m)
- Time zone: UTC-6 (Central (CST))
  - Summer (DST): UTC-5 (CDT)
- GNIS feature ID: 684867

Pink is a ghost town in Tunica County, Mississippi, United States, on the south bank of the White Oak Bayou.

Pink was founded in 1900 by Pink Bizzell, who operated the Pink Post Office from his small store. By 1907, the post office was closed.

The Phillips Church and Cemetery is all that remains of the hamlet.
