= Hutchins Landing, Mississippi =

Hutchins Landing
- Ghost town
- Location within Mississippi
- Coordinates: 31°23′31″N 91°27′29″W
- Country: United States
- State: Mississippi
- County: Adams
- Elevation: 52 ft (16 m)
- Time zone: UTC-6 (Central (CST))
  - Summer (DST): UTC-5 (CDT)
- GNIS feature ID: 691955

Hutchins Landing is a ghost town in Adams County, Mississippi, United States.

The settlement was located on the Mississippi River, approximately 15 mi (24 km) south of Natchez.

The Hutchins Landing Oil Field is located 1.5 mi (2.4 km) south of the former settlement.

== History ==
The site was located just south of where Saint Catherine Creek flowed into the Mississippi River, and may have been a place where La Salle camped in the 1670s. The creek was diverted north in the late 1800s, and what remained of the creek at Hutchins Landing was renamed Old Saint Catherine Creek.

Land in the area was granted to Anthony Hutchins in the 1780s. The Glen Aubin Plantation was established by Anthony Hutchins' son, John Odlin Hutchins, and his wife Aubin, in the 1830s. Hutchins Landing was established as the plantation's port.

Hutchins Landing may have been populated as late as 1880.

Nothing remains of Hutchins Landing, and it is today covered in forest, and located within the St. Catherine Creek National Wildlife Refuge.
