= Glen Aubin =

Historic house in Mississippi, United States

- U.S. National Register of Historic Places
- Location within Mississippi Location within the United States
- Nearest city: Natchez, Mississippi
- Coordinates: 31°23′4″N 91°26′12″W
- Architectural style: Greek Revival
- NRHP reference No.: 85001930
- Added to NRHP: August 29, 1985

Glen Aubin, also known as the Rounds Plantation, is a Greek Revival house on Hutchins Landing Road, off Highway 61 South, near Natchez, Mississippi in the United States. It has been listed on the National Register of Historic Places in Mississippi since 1985. The nearby port was called Hutchins Landing.

The house was constructed around 1835-1845 by John Odlin Hutchins and named for his wife Audin. In 1874 the plantation was purchased by African-Americans Charlie and Charity Rounds, and their family occupied the house until 1984.
