= Cloverdale, Mississippi =

- Census-designated place
- Cloverdale
- Location within Mississippi
- Coordinates: 31°29′39″N 91°25′4″W
- Country: United States
- State: Mississippi
- County: Adams

Area
  - Total: 1.14 sq mi (2.95 km^{2})
  - Land: 1.14 sq mi (2.95 km^{2})
  - Water: 0 sq mi (0.00 km^{2})
- Elevation: 190 ft (58 m)

Population (2020)
  - Total: 557
  - Density: 489.4/sq mi (188.97/km^{2})
- Time zone: UTC-6 (Central (CST))
  - Summer (DST): UTC-5 (CDT)
- GNIS feature ID: 668617

Cloverdale is a census-designated place (CDP) in Adams County, Mississippi, United States, located to the south of the city of Natchez. As of the 2020 census, it had a population of 557.

The community is located 5 miles (8 km) south of downtown Natchez on Cloverdale Road, on high ground overlooking the Mississippi River floodplain. According to the U.S. Census Bureau, it has an area of 1.1 square miles (2.9 km^{2}), all land.

== Demographics ==
Historical population
Census	Pop.	Note	%±
2010	645		—
2020	557		−13.6%
U.S. Decennial Census; 2010 2020

Cloverdale first appeared as a census designated place in the 2010 U.S. census.

=== 2020 census ===
Cloverdale CDP, Mississippi – Racial and ethnic composition Note: the US Census treats Hispanic/Latino as an ethnic category. This table excludes Latinos from the racial categories and assigns them to a separate category. Hispanics/Latinos may be of any race.
Race / Ethnicity (NH = Non-Hispanic)	Pop 2010	Pop 2020	% 2010	% 2020
White alone (NH)	217	152	33.64%	27.29%
Black or African American alone (NH)	415	351	64.34%	63.02%
Native American or Alaska Native alone (NH)	1	3	0.16%	0.54%
Asian alone (NH)	0	3	0.00%	0.54%
Native Hawaiian or Pacific Islander alone (NH)	0	0	0.00%	0.00%
Other race alone (NH)	0	0	0.00%	0.00%
Mixed race or Multiracial (NH)	9	28	1.40%	5.03%
Hispanic or Latino (any race)	3	20	0.47%	3.59%
Total	645	557	100.00%	100.00%
