= Arnot, Mississippi =

Arnot
- Ghost town
- Location within Mississippi
- Coordinates: 31°15′21″N 91°36′30″W
- Country: United States
- State: Mississippi
- County: Adams
- Elevation: 59 ft (18 m)
- Time zone: UTC-6 (Central (CST))
  - Summer (DST): UTC-5 (CDT)
- GNIS feature ID: 685898

Arnot is a ghost town located in Adams County, Mississippi, United States.

Arnot was located on the Mississippi River, on the border with Louisiana. It had a post office from 1886 to 1921. In 1900, Arnot had a population of 51.

Arnot is located on a barren peninsula called Jackson Point. South of the community is the Arnot Oil Field.
