= Port Royal, Mississippi =

- Ghost town
- Location within Mississippi
- Coordinates: 34°19′32″N 90°39′23″W
- Country: United States
- State: Mississippi
- County: Coahoma
- Time zone: UTC-6 (Central (CST))
  - Summer (DST): UTC-5 (CDT)

Port Royal is a ghost town in Coahoma County, Mississippi, United States.

Once a busy port on the Mississippi River, Port Royal today is covered by wetland and a portion of the Mississippi Levee. Nothing remains of the original settlement.

== History ==
Port Royal is the oldest town in Coahoma County, with land sales recorded prior to 1836. At that time, the Mississippi River curved east around "Horseshoe Bend", with Port Royal located at the east end of the bend.

The town may have originally been called "Powhatan", and its name was likely changed by William J. Oldham, an early settler—born in Port Royal, South Carolina—who owned land on the south bank of Horseshoe Bend.

In 1836, the newly created Coahoma County government (called the "Board of Police") designated Port Royal as its first county seat.

Port Royal was the largest and busiest town in Coahoma County, with a landing for steamboats and a few small trading stores and cabins. John Clark, the founder of Clarksdale, landed at Port Royal when he first arrived in the county.

Port Royal did not have a post office, and never incorporated.

In 1841, high waters on the Mississippi River flooded the town, and in 1842, the county seat was moved to the town of Delta.

The Mississippi River changed its course in 1848, creating the "Horseshoe Cutoff", and removing Port Royal from the contiguous flow of the river. As sediment built near the ends of Horseshoe Bend, the waterway became an oxbow lake (now called "Horseshoe Lake").

No longer a riverfront town, the economic impact was immediate and Port Royal ceased to exist. As told in 1905, "In this process, many beautiful plantations that bordered on the old river bed were abandoned and are now covered with cottonwood trees. Of old Port Royal, there remains nothing to mark its former greatness. A cotton patch covers the site."
