= Sand Hill, Attala County, Mississippi =

Sand Hill, Mississippi
- Ghost town
- Location within Mississippi
- Coordinates: 33°11′50″N 89°38′30″W
- Country: United States
- State: Mississippi
- County: Attala
- Elevation: 469 ft (143 m)
- Time zone: UTC-6 (Central (CST))
  - Summer (DST): UTC-5 (CDT)
- GNIS feature ID: 710995

Sand Hill is a ghost town in Attala County, Mississippi, United States. Sand Hill was 7.8 miles (12.6 km) east of West.
