= Profit Island =

Mississippi River island in Louisiana

Coordinates: 30°35′12″N 91°17′31″W

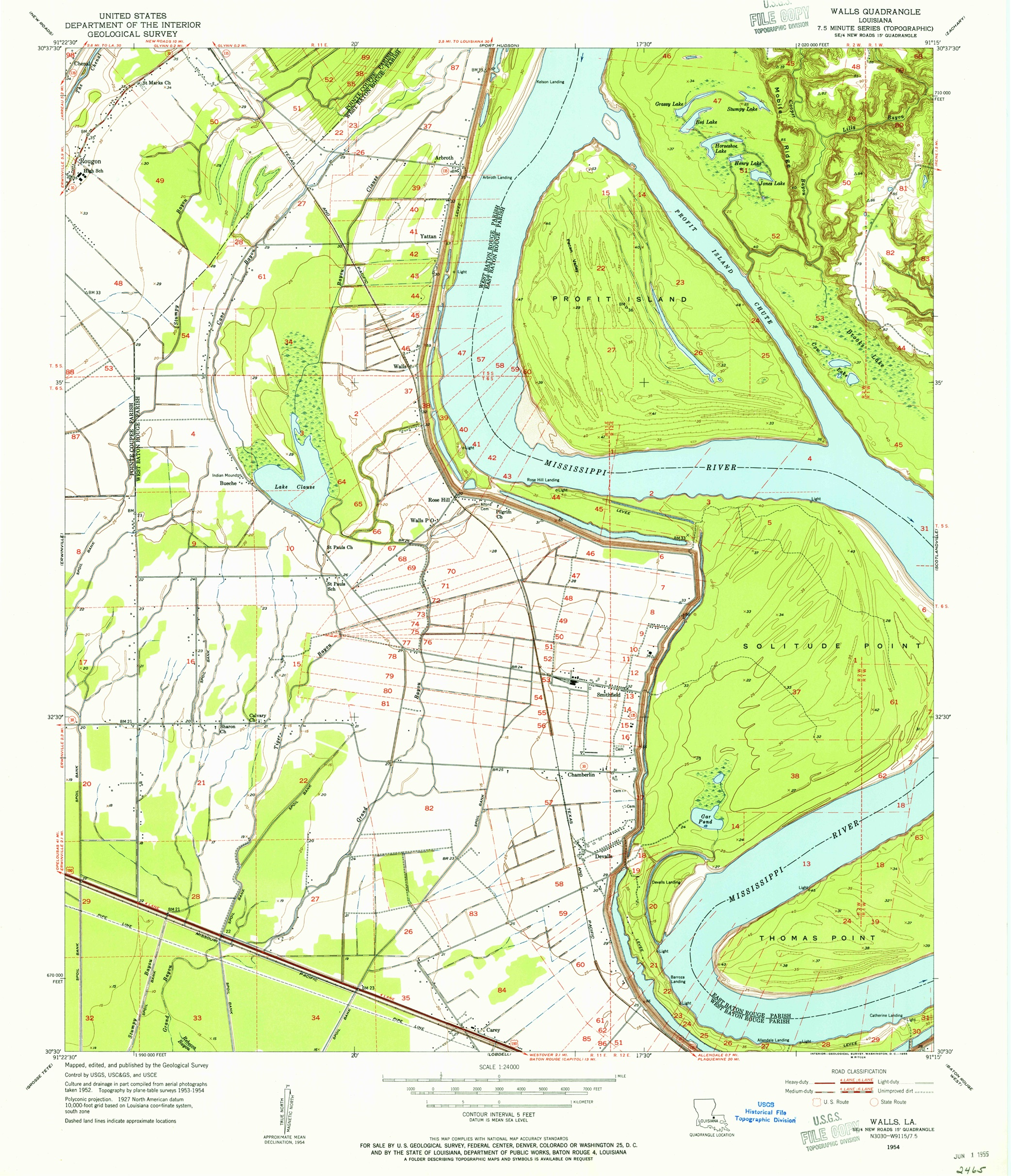
USGS quadrangle for Walls, Louisiana 1954

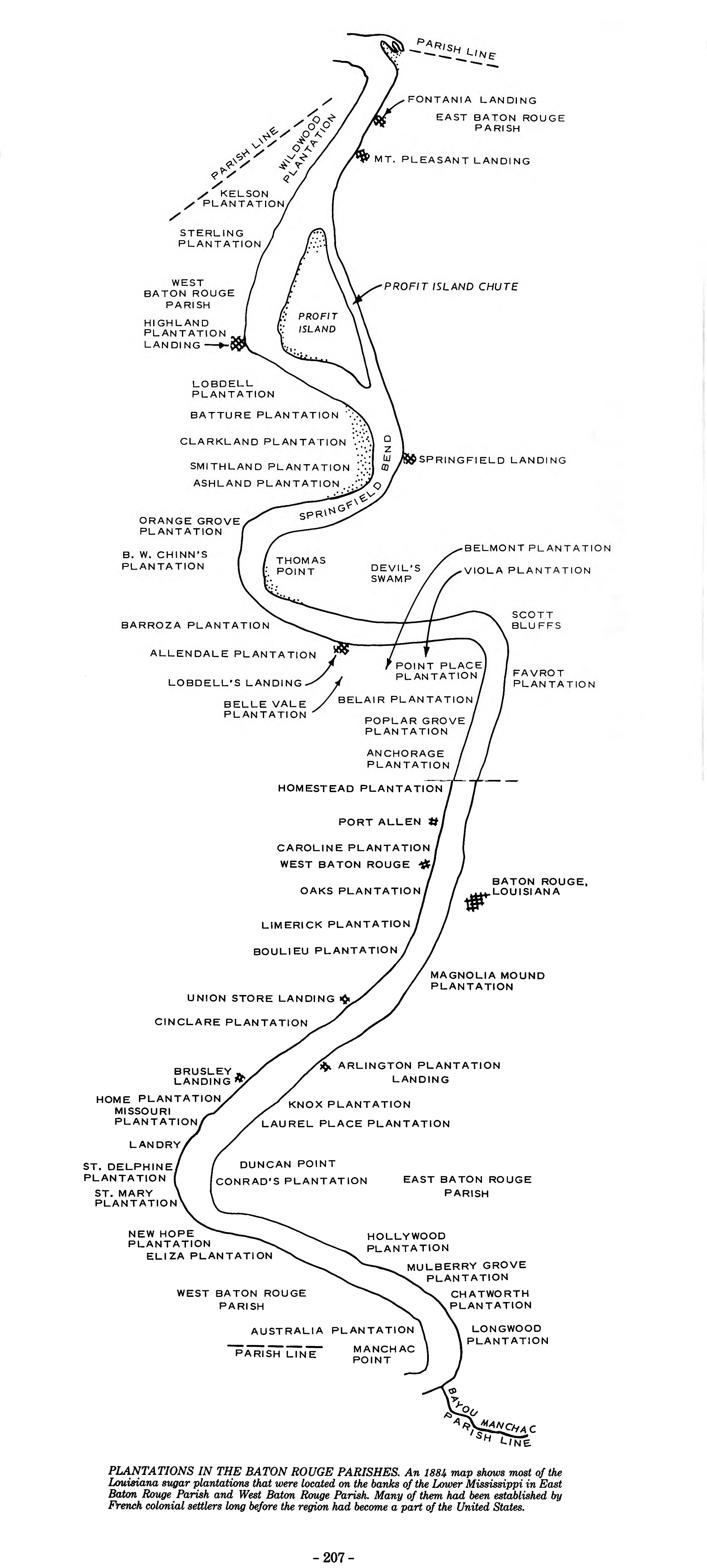
Plantations and river landings of Baton Rouge Parishes of Louisiana c. 1884

Profit Island, originally known as Islands No. 123 and 124, then Prophet Island, and also known as Browns Island and Isle de Iberville, is a 2,300-acre (930 ha) island of the Mississippi River in North America. The island is part of East Baton Rouge Parish, Louisiana, United States, and is located "just off the mouth of Thompson Creek, which breaks through the Tunica Hills from the uplands of southern Mississippi and the northern Florida parishes." Along with Middle Ground Island, Choctaw Island, Big Island, and Island No. 8, Profit is one of the "first-order islands" of the Mississippi that host 2,000 acres or more of forest.

== History ==
According to a Mississippi River guide published in 1859, the name Prophet Island was connected to a prophet of the Natchez people:

There is a tradition among the Natchez Indians, that, for years before the discovery of the "Great Waters" by the "pale-faces," their prophet, Mah-tou-la-ki-o, was in the habit of retiring to this isolated spot for the purpose of consulting the Great Spirit, and for meditation. It is said, that after one of his most prolonged visits to this place — during which time he partook of neither food nor drink, nor indulged in sleep — he returned to his people with a sorrowful countenance, and told them that they must soon leave their homes and the graves of their fathers, and seek for hunting-grounds in a strange, far-off land. He told them he had seen troops of warriors whose hearts were of stone, whose skins were of iron, (suits of armor,) and whose arrows were thunderbolts tipped with fire. Tall, gigantic canoes, he had seen, some with wings as white and as broad as the clouds of summer, and others belching forth fire and smoke, and cleaving the waters as the arrow cleaves the air. The wondering but incredulous chiefs listened with attention to the marvellous recital of their prophet, but shook their heads when he counselled immediate, or even future removal. Full of faith in his supposed vision, and discouraged and disheartened by the refusal of his people to consider his warning, the prophet retired from the council-fires of his tribe, and betook himself again to the seclusion of his favourite island. An absence of much longer duration than had ever occurred before, led to a search for him on the island, and here his body was found, cold and lifeless, lying upon the ground, with the face downwards, and the hands outspread, as though he had died in the very attitude of prayer to the Great Spirit to avert the calamities that threatened to overwhelm them. For the accuracy of this story, we cannot vouch, but we give it to our readers as it was given to us. If true, it proves the old adage that a prophet is without honour in his own country.

The island is the approximate location of the steamboat Monmouth disaster that killed 300 or more Muscogee being transported to the Indian Territory by the U.S. Army. A dredging boat called Lavacca sank near the island in 1849. The same year steamer Thomas Jefferson crashed into the levee in heavy fog and sank at Lobdell's plantation near Prophet Island. There were no casualties. The ironclad USS Essex (1856) narrowly escaped an underwater explosive tripwire at Profit Island during the American Civil War.

There was a gravel quarry on Profit Island. A natural gas processing plant was built on Profit Island in the 1980s. the island has been used for grazing cattle. The island supports hunting camps. Four hunters and their dogs drowned while returning from a trip to Profit Island in December 1975.
