= Uniontown, Mississippi =

- Ghost town
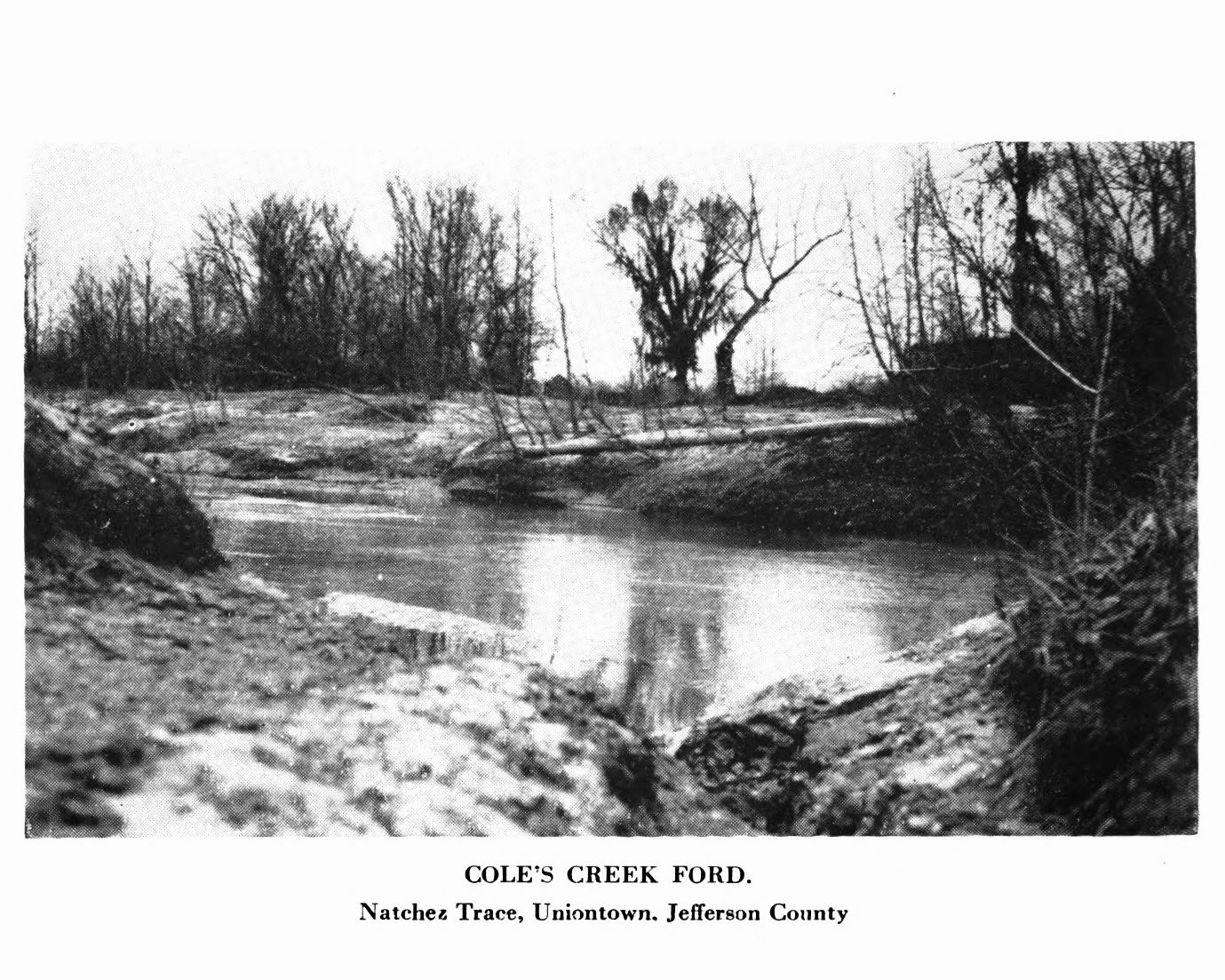
- Coles Creek Ford, Uniontown, Natchez Trace Jefferson County Mississippi c. 1938

- Location within Mississippi Location within the United States
- Coordinates: 31°45′31″N 91°10′22″W
- Country: United States
- State: Mississippi
- County: Jefferson
- Elevation: 187 ft (57 m)
- Time zone: UTC-6 (Central (CST))
  - Summer (DST): UTC-5 (CDT)
- GNIS feature ID: 686442

Uniontown is a ghost town in Jefferson County, Mississippi, United States.

Established along the Natchez Trace (also called the "Old Natchez Road") in the late 18th century, the settlement is now extinct, though "the main street is still visible running parallel to the trace".

== History ==
Uniontown was located south of Coles Creek, approximately 22 mi (35 km) northeast of Natchez.

William Ferguson, an early settler, acquired land in the area in the late 18th century and established Uniontown.

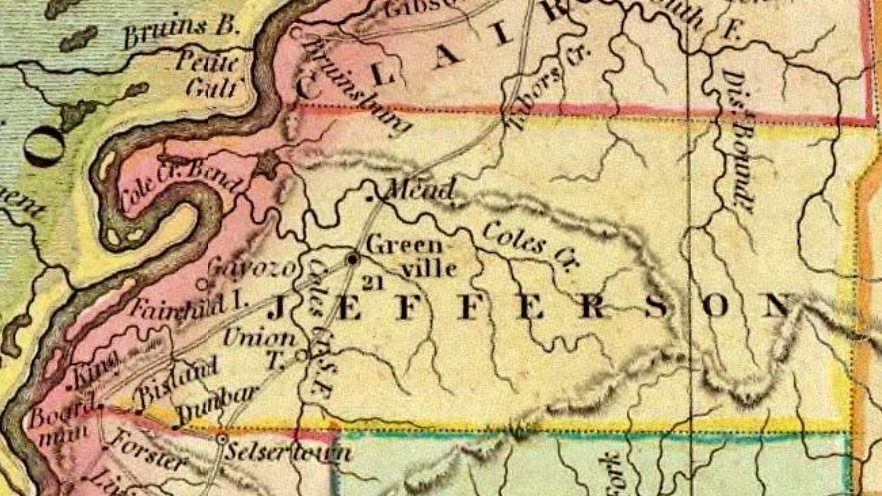
1823 map of Jefferson County, Mississippi (David Rumsey Map Collection 5388.022)

Uniontown was platted into streets, and a cotton gin manufacturer established there about 1797. Other businesses included a tannery, public gin, wagon and plow maker, weaver, cabinet maker, boot maker, bull-whip maker, and coonskin cap maker. The tanyard and shoe factory were owned by "Warner and Shackleford." The Bethel Presbyterian Church was established in Uniontown in 1804. There were three or four buildings in various states of disrepair in Uniontown in 1808.

== Decline ==
Factors contributing the Uniontown's decline include not being selected as the county seat, and the death of William Ferguson in 1801. By 1810, a traveler noted that "Uniontown is a small village of three or four houses in decay".
