= Concordia, Mississippi =

- Ghost town
- Location within Mississippi
- Coordinates: 33°58′39″N 90°57′02″W
- Country: United States
- State: Mississippi
- County: Bolivar
- Elevation: 160 ft (50 m)
- Time zone: UTC-6 (Central (CST))
  - Summer (DST): UTC-5 (CDT)
- GNIS feature ID: 691781

Concordia is a ghost town in Bolivar County, Mississippi, United States, located on the eastern edge of the Mississippi Levee, approximately 2.5 mi (4.0 km) west of Mississippi Highway 1.

Once an important Mississippi River shipping port for cotton, little remains of the community but a cemetery.

== History ==
Concordia is one of the oldest communities in Bolivar County. The Concordia Cemetery, located south of the community, has been used since 1848, and is marked with a historic plaque. The Concordia Methodist Church was also located there.

Concordia was officially formed in 1866, and included "Carson's Landing", located north of the settlement.

Concordia had a population of about 250 by 1879, when yellow fever struck, killing half the population. The town was quarantined for a period.

When the Louisville, New Orleans and Texas Railway was built in 1889, it passed 3 mi (4.8 km) east of the town, and many residents abandoned Concordia and moved to the nearby railway town of Gunnison.

The town became further isolated sometime prior to 1939, when the Mississippi River changed its course. The river had previously followed the "Concordia Bend", with the town located on the east bank. Following the diversion, the main channel of the river moved approximately 5 mi (8.0 km) west, creating "Old River Lake", and oxbow lake, as well as Island No. 70 and Island No. 71.

The area west of Concordia, between the levee and the Mississippi River, is used by the Concordia Hunting Club, and occupies 6,200 acres (2,500 ha).
