= St. Catherine Creek National Wildlife Refuge =

United States National Wildlife Refuge in Mississippi

- IUCN category IV (habitat/species management area)
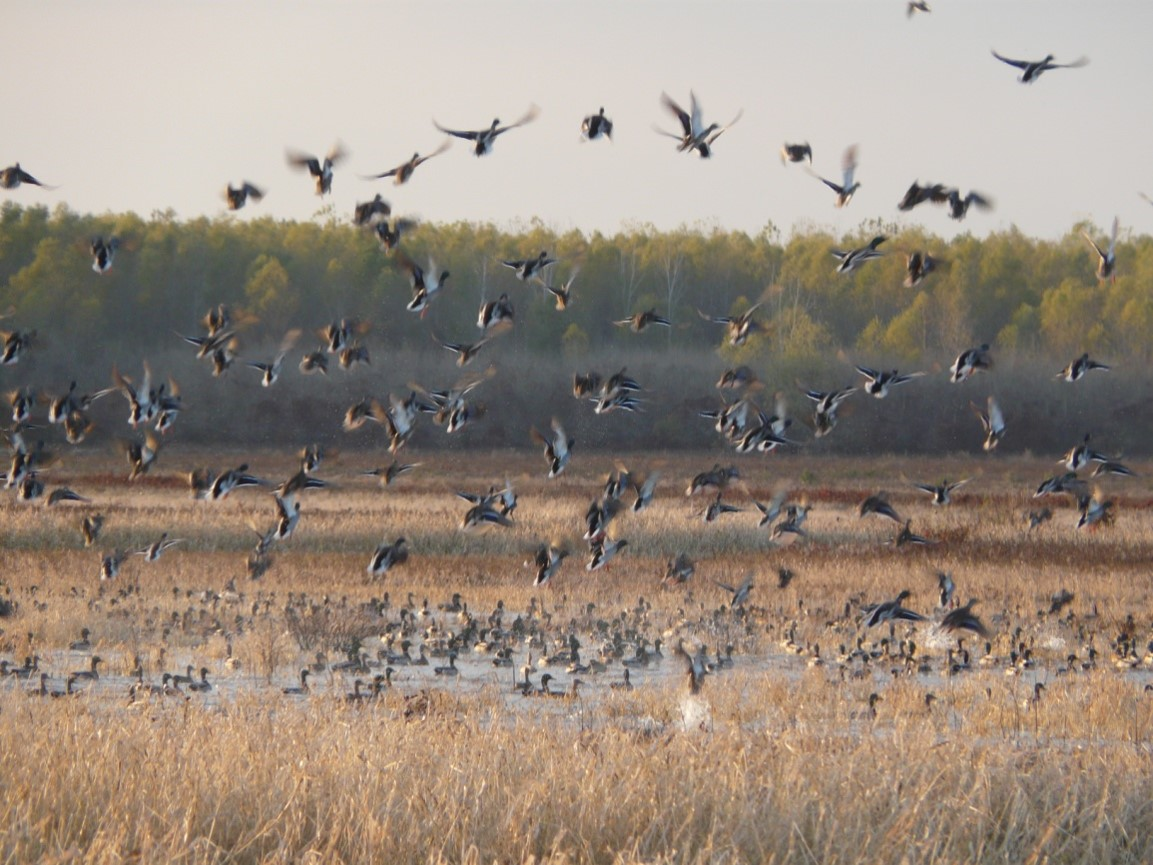
- Mallards at St Catherine Creek NWR

- Location within the United States
- Location: Adams County, Mississippi, United States
- Nearest city: Natchez, Mississippi
- Coordinates: 31°25′00″N 91°27′50″W
- Area: 34,256 acres (138.63 km^{2})
- Established: 1990
- Governing body: U.S. Fish and Wildlife Service
- Website: St. Catherine Creek National Wildlife Refuge

St. Catherine Creek National Wildlife Refuge is in Adams County, Mississippi, USA. It was established in January 1990 to preserve, improve and create habitat for waterfowl. Intensive management programs on the St. Catherine's Creek refuge provide excellent winter habitat and resting areas for waterfowl in the Lower Mississippi River Valley.

Encompassing nearly 26,000 acres (110 km^{2}), with a potential size of 34,256 acres (138.63 km^{2}), the refuge is located in Adams County in southwest Mississippi. The refuge is 10% open water and 90% cleared and batture land; almost a third of the refuge is Cypress swamps and hardwood forests. The refuge is also home to over 250 bird species, including the chipping sparrow and the cooper’s hawk. The headquarters lies 13 miles (21 km) south of Natchez, Mississippi.

Natchez is the oldest European settlement on the Mississippi River and is known for its beautiful antebellum homes. The western refuge boundary is formed by the Mississippi River. The eastern boundary meanders along the loessal bluffs, and the southern boundary borders the Homochitto River.
