= Delta, Mississippi =

Extinct riverfront settlement

- Ghost town
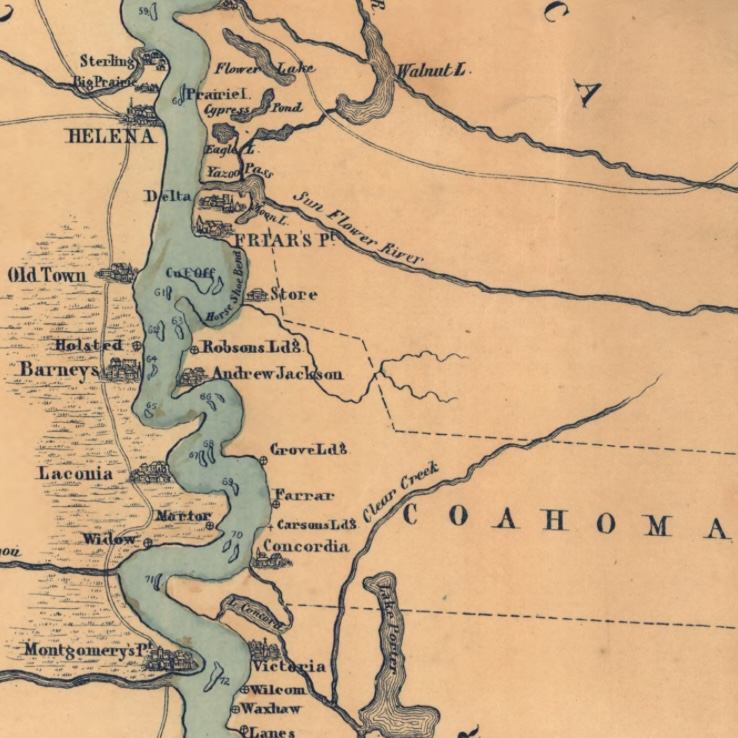
- Map published 1863, showing riverfront landmarks of Coahoma County including old Delta; Andrew Jackson refers to the plantation of Andrew Jackson Jr.

- Location within Mississippi
- Coordinates: 34°24′16″N 90°34′20″W
- Country: United States
- State: Mississippi
- County: Coahoma
- Elevation: 174 ft (53 m)
- Time zone: UTC-6 (Central (CST))
  - Summer (DST): UTC-5 (CDT)
- GNIS feature ID: 691807

Delta is a ghost town in Coahoma County, Mississippi, United States. During its heyday in the 1830s to the 1850s it was the county "seat of justice" and had some commercial significance due to its location on the Yazoo Pass connection from the Mississippi River to inland waterways. However, the town struggled to thrive due to frequent flooding and a rather malarial site. During the American Civil War the commercial buildings and residences of Delta were all burned down, apparently by Union troops hoping to disrupt cotton smuggling via the boat landing.

Delta today is covered by farmland and a portion of the Mississippi Levee. Nothing remains of the original settlement.

== History ==
The town site was chosen because of its location on the crucial Yazoo Pass, which was the "principal water passage between the Mississippi and the Coldwater rivers. The Coldwater, in turn, provided access to the Tallahatchie, the Yalobusha and the Yazoo rivers." In early years it was primarily a woodyard that sold fuel for wood-fired steamboat engines; other lumber products were also shipped from Delta.

The county seat was moved from Port Royal to Delta in 1842.

In 1844, Delta was surveyed and laid off into 174 lots. The town had a population of about 700, and was a busy steamboat port.

Delta incorporated in 1848. That same year, the river flooded the town, forcing many residents to relocate to nearby Friars Point.

The county seat was moved to Friars Point in 1850.

During the American Civil War, sometime in early December 1862, all of the buildings in Delta were burned down, possibly because the boat landing had been used as a transshipment point for cotton smugglers.

A post office operated under the name Delta from 1840 to 1890, but the office was discontinued/closed and reorganized three times during that period of time.

By 1890, nothing remained of Delta.
