= Adams County, Mississippi =

County in Mississippi, United States

- County
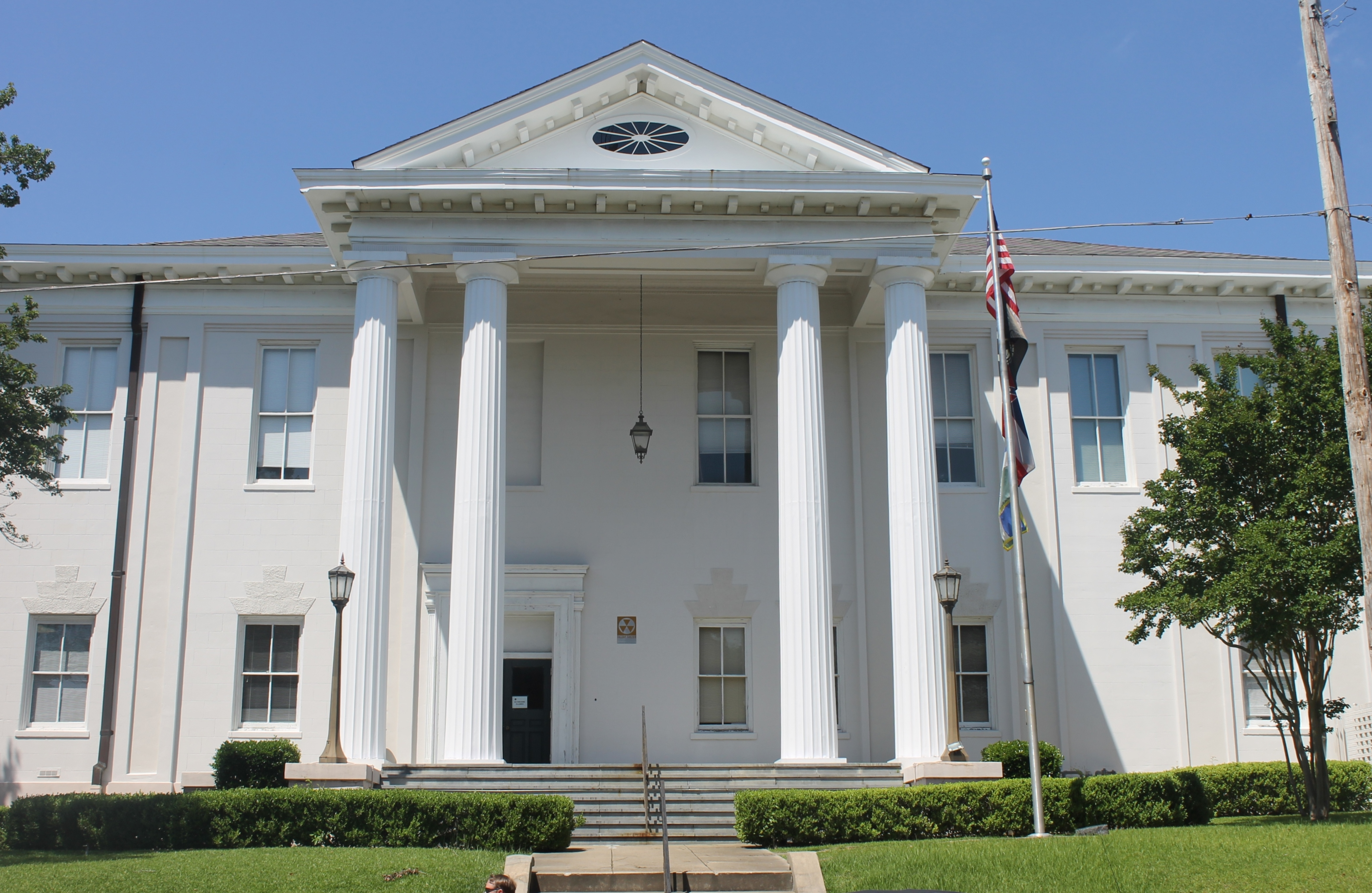
- Adams County Courthouse

- Flag Seal

- Location within the U.S. state of Mississippi
- Coordinates: 31°29′N 91°21′W
- Country: United States
- State: Mississippi
- Founded: 1799
- Named for: John Adams
- Seat: Natchez
- Largest city: Natchez

Area
  - Total: 488 sq mi (1,260 km^{2})
  - Land: 462 sq mi (1,200 km^{2})
  - Water: 25 sq mi (65 km^{2}) 5.2%

Population (2020)
  - Total: 29,538
  - Estimate (2025): 30,061 ▲
  - Density: 63.9/sq mi (24.7/km^{2})
- Time zone: UTC−6 (Central)
  - Summer (DST): UTC−5 (CDT)
- Congressional district: 2nd
- Website: www.adamscountyms.net

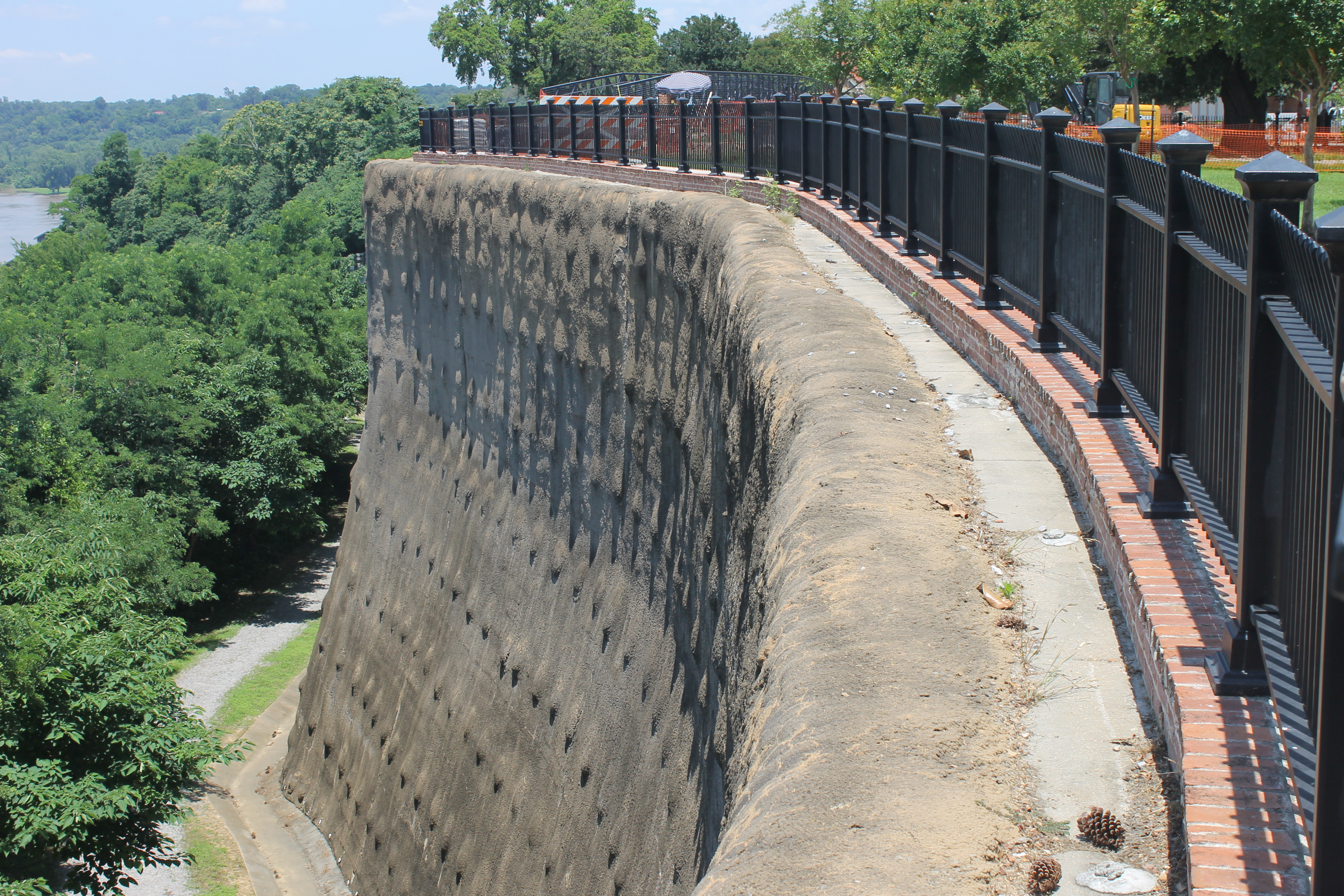
Stone wall provides protection to Natchez, Mississippi from the Mississippi River.

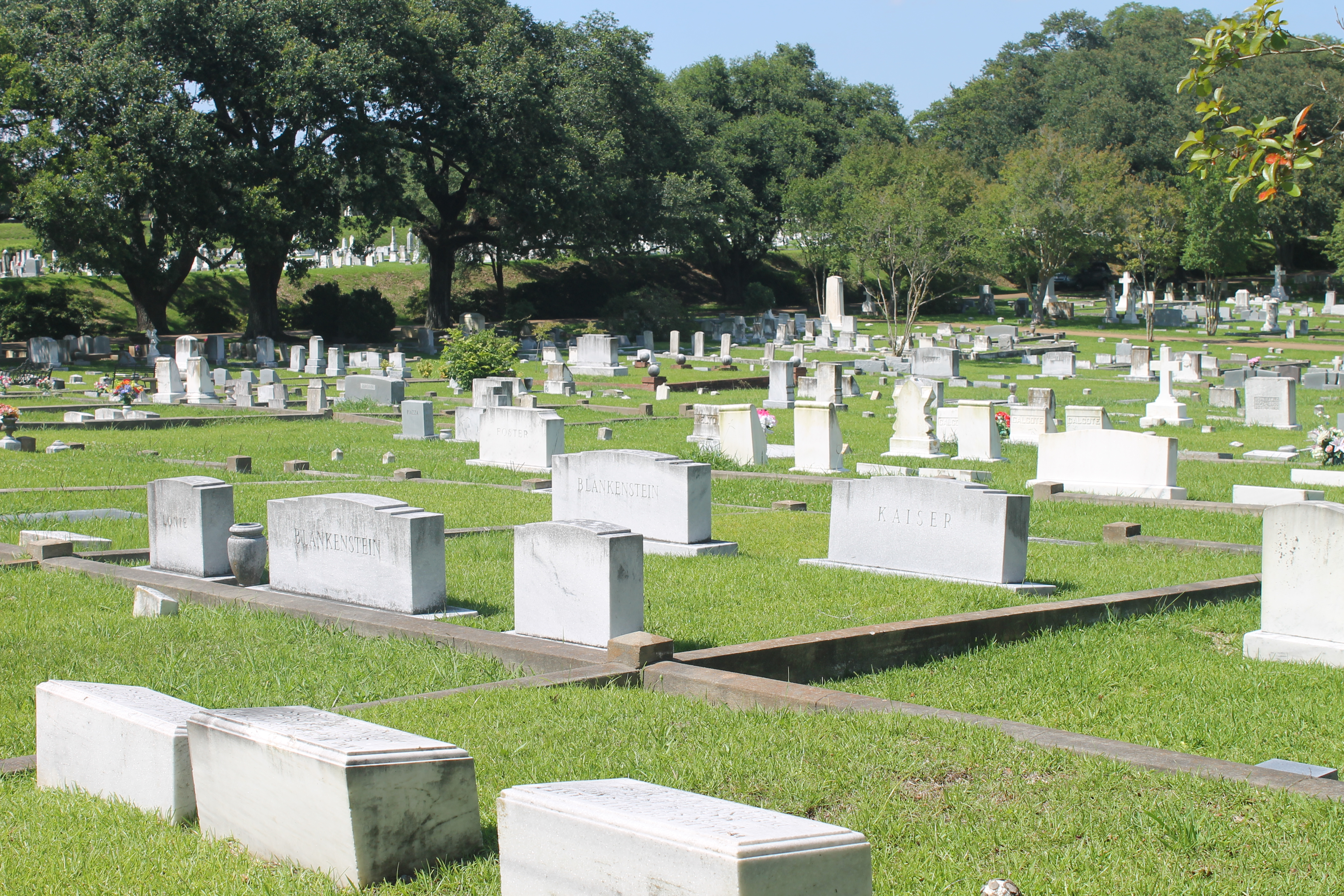
A portion of the historic Natchez City Cemetery in Adams County

Adams County is a county located in the U.S. state of Mississippi. As of the 2020 United States census, the population was 29,538. The county seat is Natchez. The county is the first to have been organized in the former Mississippi Territory. It is named for the second President of the United States, John Adams, who held that office when the county was organized in 1799. Adams County is part of the Natchez micropolitan area, which consists of Adams County, Mississippi, and Concordia Parish, Louisiana.

== History ==
Adams County was created on April 2, 1799, from part of Pickering Territorial County. The county was organized eighteen years before Mississippi became a state. Five Mississippi governors have come from Adams County: David Holmes, George Poindexter, John A. Quitman, Gerard Brandon, and William Allain.

In 1860, before the American Civil War, Adams County had one of the highest concentrations of wealth in the United States, much of it derived from the plantation economy and the labor of enslaved African Americans.

== Geography ==
According to the U.S. Census Bureau, the county has a total area of 488 square miles (1,260 km^{2}), of which 462 square miles (1,200 km^{2}) is land and 25 square miles (65 km^{2}) (5.2%) is water.

=== Major highways ===
- U.S. Highway 61
- U.S. Highway 84
- U.S. Highway 98
- U.S. Highway 425
- Natchez Trace Parkway

=== Adjacent counties and parishes ===
- Jefferson County (north)
- Franklin County (east)
- Wilkinson County (south)
- Concordia Parish, Louisiana (southwest)
- Tensas Parish, Louisiana (northwest)

=== National protected areas ===
- Homochitto National Forest (part)
- Natchez National Historical Park
- Natchez Trace Parkway (part)
- St. Catherine Creek National Wildlife Refuge

== Demographics ==
Historical population
Census	Pop.	Note	%±
1800	4,660		—
1810	10,002		114.6%
1820	12,076		20.7%
1830	14,937		23.7%
1840	19,434		30.1%
1850	18,601		−4.3%
1860	20,165		8.4%
1870	19,084		−5.4%
1880	22,649		18.7%
1890	26,031		14.9%
1900	30,111		15.7%
1910	25,265		−16.1%
1920	22,183		−12.2%
1930	23,564		6.2%
1940	27,238		15.6%
1950	32,256		18.4%
1960	37,730		17.0%
1970	37,293		−1.2%
1980	38,035		2.0%
1990	35,356		−7.0%
2000	34,340		−2.9%
2010	32,297		−5.9%
2020	29,538		−8.5%
2025 (est.)	30,061	▲	1.8%
U.S. Decennial Census; 1790-1960 1900-1990; 1990-2000 2010-2013

=== 2020 census ===
As of the 2020 census, the county had a population of 29,538. The median age was 43.7 years. 20.3% of residents were under the age of 18, and 21.6% of residents were 65 years of age or older. For every 100 females there were 90.8 males, and for every 100 females age 18 and over there were 89.0 males age 18 and over.

The racial makeup of the county was 37.2% White, 56.8% Black or African American, 0.2% American Indian and Alaska Native, 0.6% Asian, <0.1% Native Hawaiian and Pacific Islander, 2.6% from some other race, and 2.6% from two or more races. Hispanic or Latino residents of any race comprised 3.4% of the population.

63.5% of residents lived in urban areas, while 36.5% lived in rural areas.

There were 12,686 households in the county, of which 26.0% had children under the age of 18 living in them. Of all households, 31.5% were married-couple households, 21.3% were households with a male householder and no spouse or partner present, and 42.0% were households with a female householder and no spouse or partner present. About 36.0% of all households were made up of individuals, and 16.5% had someone living alone who was 65 years of age or older.

There were 14,885 housing units, of which 14.8% were vacant. Among occupied housing units, 66.7% were owner-occupied, and 33.3% were renter-occupied. The homeowner vacancy rate was 2.7%, and the rental vacancy rate was 10.0%.

=== Racial and ethnic composition ===
Adams County, Mississippi – Racial and ethnic composition Note: the US Census treats Hispanic/Latino as an ethnic category. This table excludes Latinos from the racial categories and assigns them to a separate category. Hispanics/Latinos may be of any race.
Race / Ethnicity (NH = Non-Hispanic)	Pop 1980	Pop 1990	Pop 2000	Pop 2010	Pop 2020	% 1980	% 1990	% 2000	% 2010	% 2020
White alone (NH)	19,453	17,938	15,701	12,485	10,926	51.14%	50.74%	45.72%	38.66%	36.99%
Black or African American alone (NH)	18,240	17,162	18,026	17,150	16,709	47.96%	48.54%	52.49%	53.10%	56.57%
Native American or Alaska Native alone (NH)	13	38	49	76	56	0.03%	0.11%	0.14%	0.24%	0.19%
Asian alone (NH)	44	62	85	126	165	0.12%	0.18%	0.25%	0.39%	0.56%
Native Hawaiian or Pacific Islander alone (NH)	x	x	4	3	7	x	x	0.01%	0.01%	0.02%
Other race alone (NH)	9	4	12	23	35	0.02%	0.01%	0.03%	0.07%	0.12%
Mixed race or Multiracial (NH)	x	x	190	284	628	x	x	0.55%	0.88%	2.13%
Hispanic or Latino (any race)	276	152	273	2,150	1,012	0.73%	0.43%	0.79%	6.66%	3.43%
Total	38,035	35,356	34,340	32,297	29,538	100.00%	100.00%	100.00%	100.00%	100.00%

=== 2010 census ===
As of the 2010 census, there were 32,297 people, 11,237 households, and 6,650 families residing in the county. In 2010, 53.5% were Black or African American, 42.7% White, 0.4% Asian, 0.3% Native American, 1.7% of some other race and 1.4% of two or more races. 6.7% were Hispanic or Latino (of any race).

== Education ==
All residents of the county are in the Natchez-Adams School District.

Alcorn State University, a historically black college designated as a land-grant institution, has its School of Business and School of Nursing in Natchez. The School of Business offers a Master of Business Administration degree and some undergraduate classes at its Natchez campus.

It is in the district of Copiah–Lincoln Community College, and has been since 1971. There is a campus in Natchez. This is adjacent to the Natchez campus of Alcorn State University.

== Economy ==
Adams County Correctional Center, a private prison operated by the Corrections Corporation of America on behalf of the Federal Bureau of Prisons, is in an unincorporated area in the county.

=== Top employers ===
The top employers of Adams County are as follows:

1. Natchez-Adams School District (620)
2. Merit Health Natchez (425)
3. Adams County Correctional Center (380)
4. Walmart (365)
5. City of Natchez (275)
6. Magnolia Bluffs Casino (250)
7. Jordan Carriers (250)
8. Supermarket Operations (250)
9. Adams County Government (220)
10. Energy Drilling (220)

== Communities ==
=== City ===
- Natchez (county seat and only municipality)

=== Unincorporated areas ===
==== Census-designated places ====
- Cloverdale
- Morgantown

==== Other communities ====
- Cranfield
- Kingston
- Pine Ridge
- Sibley
- Stanton
- Washington

=== Ghost/extinct towns ===
- Arnot
- Briers
- Ellis Cliffs
- Hutchins Landing
- Kienstra
- Selsertown

== Politics ==
United States presidential election results for Adams County, Mississippi
Year	Republican		Democratic		Third party(ies)	
Year	No.	%	No.	%	No.	%
1912	31	4.06%	491	64.35%	241	31.59%
1916	42	5.88%	671	93.98%	1	0.14%
1920	114	15.02%	642	84.58%	3	0.40%
1924	304	26.30%	836	72.32%	16	1.38%
1928	840	38.59%	1,337	61.41%	0	0.00%
1932	384	21.11%	1,420	78.06%	15	0.82%
1936	124	6.67%	1,732	93.12%	4	0.22%
1940	166	8.15%	1,869	91.80%	1	0.05%
1944	282	14.69%	1,638	85.31%	0	0.00%
1948	95	4.32%	71	3.23%	2,034	92.45%
1952	2,372	58.29%	1,697	41.71%	0	0.00%
1956	1,664	40.64%	1,279	31.24%	1,151	28.11%
1960	1,227	23.57%	1,452	27.90%	2,526	48.53%
1964	5,900	84.37%	1,093	15.63%	0	0.00%
1968	1,475	10.93%	5,214	38.62%	6,812	50.46%
1972	8,500	67.16%	3,697	29.21%	460	3.63%
1976	6,431	46.40%	6,619	47.75%	811	5.85%
1980	7,523	48.97%	7,228	47.05%	612	3.98%
1984	9,440	54.32%	7,849	45.17%	89	0.51%
1988	8,116	50.74%	7,732	48.34%	146	0.91%
1992	5,831	36.73%	8,255	51.99%	1,791	11.28%
1996	5,378	37.29%	8,218	56.99%	825	5.72%
2000	6,691	44.97%	8,065	54.20%	123	0.83%
2004	6,996	45.22%	8,423	54.45%	51	0.33%
2008	6,566	41.83%	9,021	57.47%	109	0.69%
2012	6,293	40.74%	9,061	58.66%	93	0.60%
2016	5,874	42.45%	7,757	56.06%	205	1.48%
2020	5,696	41.40%	7,917	57.54%	146	1.06%
2024	5,081	42.60%	6,743	56.53%	104	0.87%

Like much of the former Solid South, Adams County voted overwhelmingly Democratic during the era of white Democratic dominance and black voter disenfranchisement that followed Reconstruction. After supporting segregationist Dixiecrat Strom Thurmond in the 1948 election, it began shifting toward the Republican Party during the broader political realignment of white Southern voters in the post–civil rights era. Since the 1992 election, Adams County has generally voted Democratic in presidential elections.

== See also ==
- Jefferson College
- National Register of Historic Places listings in Adams County, Mississippi

== Sources ==
- Brieger, James. Hometown, Mississippi. ISBN 1-886017-27-1
