= Memphis metropolitan area =

Greater Memphis
- Combined Statistical Area
- Memphis, TN–MS–AR Combined Statistical Area
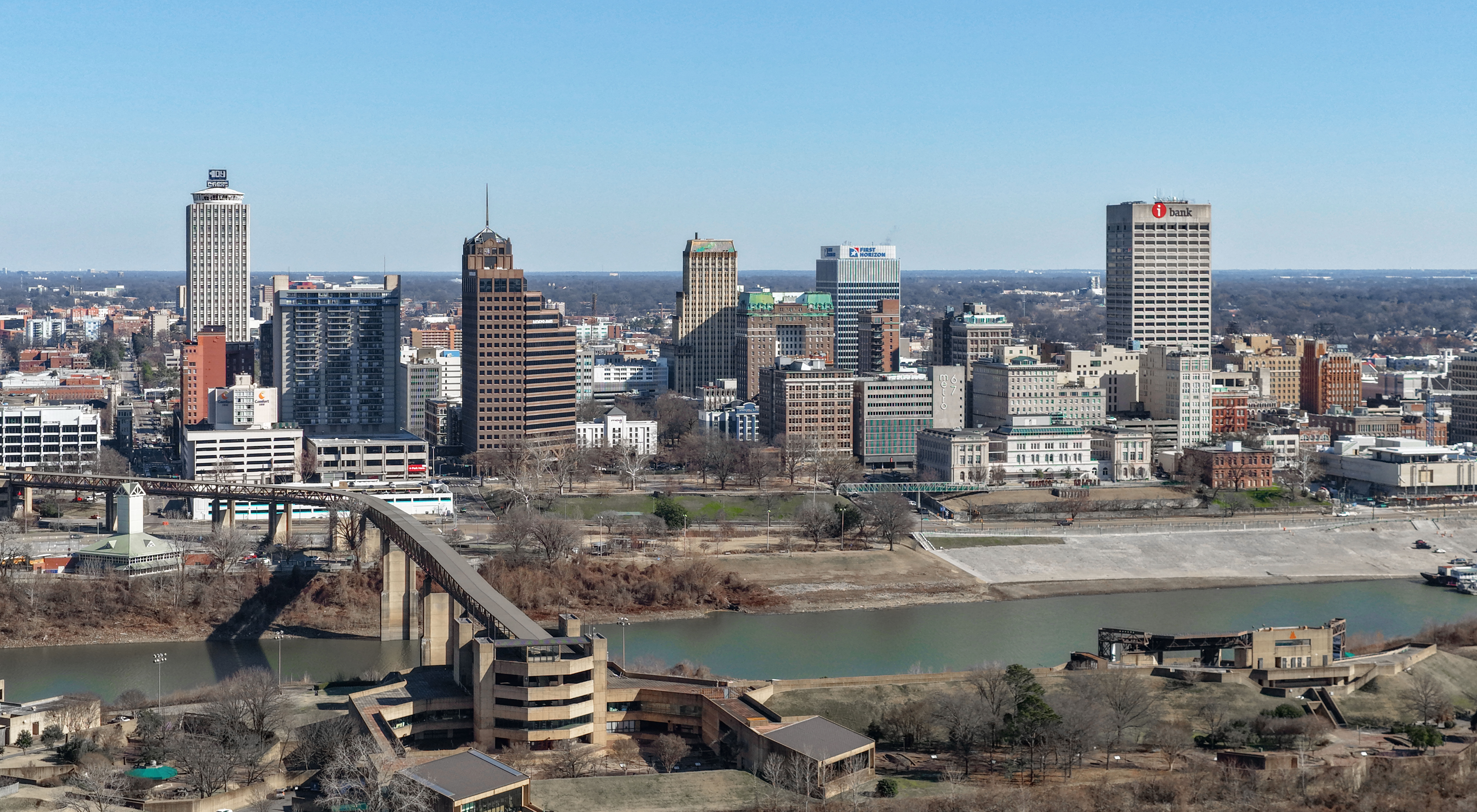
- Downtown Memphis skyline

- Coordinates: 35°01′26″N 89°52′09″W
- Country: United States
- State(s): Tennessee; Mississippi; Arkansas
- Largest city: Memphis, Tennessee (656,861)
- Other cities: Bartlett, Tennessee (58,264); Southaven, Mississippi (51,824); Collierville, Tennessee (48,655)

Area
  - Total: 4,599 sq mi (11,910 km^{2})

Population (2020)
  - Total: 1,389,905
  - Rank: 41st in the U.S.
  - Density: 427/sq mi (164.8/km^{2})

GDP
  - Total: $102.934 billion (2023)

The Memphis–Clarksdale–Forrest City Combined Statistical Area, TN–MS–AR (CSA) or Greater Memphis is the commercial and cultural hub of the Mid-South centered on the city of Memphis. The census-defined combined statistical area covers eleven counties in three states, Tennessee, Mississippi, and Arkansas. As of 2020 census, the Memphis metropolitan area had a population of 1,389,905 The Forrest City, Arkansas Micropolitan area was added to the Memphis area in 2012 to form the Memphis–Forrest City Combined Statistical area. In 2023, the Clarksdale, Mississippi Micropolitan area was also added to form the new Memphis-Clarksdale-Forrest City Combined Statistical Area which as of 2023 had a population of roughly 1.4 million people according to census estimates.

The greater Mid-South area has a population of 2.4 million, according to 2013 census estimates. This area is covered by Memphis local news channels and includes the Missouri Bootheel, Northeast Arkansas, West Tennessee, and North Mississippi.

== Regional identity ==
The Memphis metropolitan area is part of the Mid-South of the U.S. It is culturally more associated with the Deep South and the Mississippi Delta than it is the Upland South, which is the case with Tennessee's other large cities. Memphis is the largest city in the Mid-South, the third-largest in the Southeastern U.S., and the eighth-largest in the Southern U.S. as a whole. African-Americans make up nearly half the population of the metro area. The Mid-South has the highest percentage of African Americans of all large metro areas with at least a million people. It is the second-largest when metropolitan areas under a million people are factored in after the Jackson-Vicksburg-Brookhaven, MS Combined Statistical Area.

The metro area is blue collar in nature and most of its growth can be attributed to its logistical infrastructure. Recently, however, more companies with technology backgrounds such as Electrolux and Mitsubishi have begun making inroads in the Memphis area.

== Economy ==
Positioned on America's largest river, the Mississippi, and Memphis is a distribution hub. FedEx maintains its global headquarters in Memphis and uses the Memphis International Airport as its global superhub facility. The airport is the second busiest cargo airport by volume of cargo in the United States. UPS also uses Memphis as a hub. The area is also home to one of the United States largest intermodal logistics centers. This includes being the third-largest trucking corridor, fourth-largest inland port, and third-largest in class I railroad services. The Mid-South has the largest percentage of people employed in logistics in the U.S. The Mid-South is also home to several Fortune 500 and 1000 companies, including FedEx, AutoZone, Regions Bank, ServiceMaster, BUPERS, First Horizon Bank, International Paper, and others. Companies including Nike, Baskin Robbins, Sharp, and Hewlett-Packard operate large distribution centers out of Memphis.

Healthcare has begun to play a major role in the Mid-South's economy accounting for one in nine jobs. There are nineteen hospitals with over 4,100 beds in the Mid-South. The area is also home to St. Jude Children's Research Hospital, a Nobel Prize winning hospital with over 1,200 scientists working there and the University of Tennessee Health Science Center.

=== Tourism ===
Tourism is also a major contributor to the Mid-South's economy with the region being known as the birthplace of Rock and Roll and Blues. Over eight million people visit the Memphis metropolitan area every year for tourist related activities. Over four million people visit Beale Street every year making it the most visited attraction in Tennessee. The Memphis Zoo is routinely ranked as one of the best zoos in America. The Tunica casino resort area in Mississippi has over twelve million visitors annually and is the third largest gaming area in the U.S. after Las Vegas and Atlantic City. It also contains a lake beach at Sardis Lake near Batesville, Mississippi.

== Colleges and universities ==
Four Year Colleges and Graduate Schools

- University of Memphis
- Rhodes College
- Christian Brothers University
- LeMoyne–Owen College
- Baptist Health Sciences University
- University of Tennessee Health Science Center
- Southern College of Optometry
- Rust College

Two Year Colleges

- Southwest Tennessee Community College
- Arkansas State University Mid-South
- Phillips Community College of the University of Arkansas
- Crowley's Ridge College
- Northwest Mississippi Community College
- Coahoma Community College

== Transportation ==
Airports:

- Memphis International Airport
- General DeWitt Spain Airport
- Olive Branch Airport
- Millington Municipal Airport

Freeways:

- I-40
- I-240 (Inner Beltway)
- I-55
- I-69
- I-269 (Outer Beltway connecting Shelby County to Fayette and DeSoto counties)
- I-22 (Connects Hickory Hill and DeSoto County, Mississippi, to Birmingham, and Atlanta)
- Bill Morris Parkway (Connects Piperton, Collierville, Germantown, Southwind, and Hickory Hill to I-240)
- Sam Cooper Boulevard (Connects East Memphis and Bartlett to Midtown)
- SR 300 (Located in the Frayser area, connects Watkins and the I-240 loop to US 51)
- I-555 (Connects Memphis to Jonesboro, Arkansas)
- SR 14 (Connects Raleigh to Memphis)

== Composition ==
The Memphis–Clarksdale–Forrest City, TN-MS-AR Combined Statistical Area includes the following counties:

County	Largest City	2025 Estimate	2020 Census	Change	Area	Density
Shelby County, Tennessee	Memphis	910,226	929,744	−2.10%	785 sq mi (2,030 km^{2})	1,160/sq mi (448/km^{2})
DeSoto County, Mississippi	Southaven	197,918	185,314	+6.80%	497 sq mi (1,290 km^{2})	398/sq mi (154/km^{2})
Tipton County, Tennessee	Atoka	62,287	60,970	+2.16%	473 sq mi (1,230 km^{2})	132/sq mi (51/km^{2})
Crittenden County, Arkansas	West Memphis	46,210	48,163	−4.05%	636 sq mi (1,650 km^{2})	73/sq mi (28/km^{2})
Fayette County, Tennessee	Oakland	45,071	41,990	+7.34%	706 sq mi (1,830 km^{2})	64/sq mi (25/km^{2})
Marshall County, Mississippi	Holly Springs	34,654	33,752	+2.67%	710 sq mi (1,800 km^{2})	49/sq mi (19/km^{2})
Tate County, Mississippi	Senatobia	28,725	28,064	+2.36%	411 sq mi (1,060 km^{2})	70/sq mi (27/km^{2})
St. Francis County, Arkansas	Forrest City	21,800	23,090	−5.59%	643 sq mi (1,670 km^{2})	34/sq mi (13/km^{2})
Coahoma County, Mississippi	Clarksdale	19,849	21,390	−7.20%	583 sq mi (1,510 km^{2})	34/sq mi (13/km^{2})
Tunica County, Mississippi	Tunica	8,819	9,782	−9.84%	481 sq mi (1,250 km^{2})	18/sq mi (7/km^{2})
Benton County, Mississippi	Hickory Flat	7,502	7,646	−1.88%	409 sq mi (1,060 km^{2})	18/sq mi (7/km^{2})
Total		1,383,061	1,389,905	−0.49%	3,989 sq mi (10,330 km^{2})	347/sq mi (134/km^{2})

== Population history ==
Historical population
Census	Pop.	Note	%±
1900	153,557		—
1910	191,439		24.7%
1920	223,216		16.6%
1930	306,482		37.3%
1940	358,250		16.9%
1950	482,393		34.7%
1960	811,082		68.1%
1970	911,123		12.3%
1980	997,844		9.5%
1990	1,067,263		7.0%
2000	1,205,204		12.9%
2010	1,316,100		9.2%
2020	1,346,172		2.3%
2023 (est.)	1,335,674		−0.8%
U.S. Decennial Census

== Cities and towns ==
=== Places with more than 500,000 inhabitants ===
- Memphis, Tennessee (Principal City)

=== Places with 50,000 to 100,000 inhabitants ===
- Bartlett, Tennessee
- Southaven, Mississippi
- Collierville, Tennessee

=== Places with 10,000 to 50,000 inhabitants ===
- Arlington, Tennessee
- Atoka, Tennessee
- Forrest City, Arkansas
- Germantown, Tennessee
- Hernando, Mississippi
- Horn Lake, Mississippi
- Lakeland, Tennessee
- Marion, Arkansas
- Millington, Tennessee
- Olive Branch, Mississippi
- West Memphis, Arkansas

=== Places with 1,000 to 10,000 inhabitants ===
- Brighton, Tennessee
- Byhalia, Mississippi
- Coldwater, Mississippi
- Covington, Tennessee
- Earle, Arkansas
- Holly Springs, Mississippi
- Mason, Tennessee
- Munford, Tennessee
- Oakland, Tennessee
- Piperton, Tennessee
- Pleasant Hill, Mississippi
- Rossville, Tennessee
- Senatobia, Mississippi
- Somerville, Tennessee
- Tunica, Mississippi
- Tunica Resorts, Mississippi (CDP)
- Victoria, Mississippi (CDP)
- Walls, Mississippi
- Wynne, Arkansas

=== Places with fewer than 1,000 inhabitants ===
- Anthonyville, Arkansas
- Arkabutla, Mississippi (CDP)
- Ashland, Mississippi
- Bethlehem, Mississippi (CDP)
- Braden, Tennessee
- Burlison, Tennessee
- Clarkedale, Arkansas
- Crawfordsville, Arkansas
- Dundee, Mississippi (CDP)
- Edmondson, Arkansas
- Eudora, Mississippi (CDP)
- Gallaway, Tennessee
- Garland, Tennessee
- Gilmore, Arkansas
- Gilt Edge, Tennessee
- Grand Junction, Tennessee
- Hickory Flat, Mississippi
- Horseshoe Lake, Arkansas
- Jericho, Arkansas
- Jennette, Arkansas
- La Grange, Tennessee
- Lake View, Mississippi (CDP)
- Mount Pleasant, Mississippi (CDP)
- Moscow, Tennessee
- Potts Camp, Mississippi
- Red Banks, Mississippi (CDP)
- Snow Lake Shores, Mississippi
- Strayhorn, Mississippi (CDP)
- Sunset, Arkansas
- Turrell, Arkansas
- Waterford, Mississippi (CDP)
- Williston, Tennessee

=== Unincorporated places ===
- Banks, Mississippi
- Bruins, Arkansas
- Brunswick, Tennessee
- Chulahoma, Mississippi
- Cockrum, Mississippi
- Cordova, Tennessee
- Drummonds, Tennessee
- Dubbs, Mississippi
- Eads, Tennessee
- Ellendale, Tennessee
- Evansville, Mississippi
- Fisherville, Tennessee
- Hickory Withe, Tennessee
- Hollywood, Mississippi
- Hudsonville, Mississippi
- Kerrville, Tennessee
- Laconia, Tennessee
- Lake Cormorant, Mississippi
- Looxahoma, Mississippi
- Macon, Tennessee
- Mineral Wells, Mississippi
- Nesbit, Mississippi
- Northaven, Tennessee
- Prichard, Mississippi
- Randolph, Tennessee
- Reverie, Tennessee
- Rosemark, Tennessee
- Sarah, Mississippi
- Savage, Mississippi
- Seyppel, Arkansas
- Shell Lake, Arkansas
- Shelby Forest, Tennessee
- Simsboro, Arkansas
- Southwind, Tennessee
- Slayden, Mississippi
- Thyatira, Mississippi
- Tipton, Tennessee
- Tyro, Mississippi

== Demographics ==
According to U.S. census estimates for 2013, there were 1,371,110 people residing within the CSA. The racial makeup of the CSA was 45.2% non-Hispanic White, 47.3% African American, 0.5% Native American, 2.2% Asian, <0.1% Pacific Islander, and Hispanic or Latino of any race were 5.1% of the population. Memphis is the only metropolitan/combined statistical area in the United States with over a million people to have a plurality/majority African American population. The Jackson, Mississippi metropolitan area also has this distinction but only has around half a million people.

The median income for a household in the MSA was $47,344 and the mean was $65,463. The median income for a family was $57,780 and the mean was $76,126. The per capita income for the MSA was $24,675.

== See also ==
- Tennessee census statistical areas
- Mississippi census statistical areas
- Arkansas census statistical areas
