= List of census-designated places in Mississippi =

Census-designated places (CDPs) are unincorporated communities lacking elected municipal officers and boundaries with legal status. The term "census designated place" has been used as an official classification by the U.S. Census Bureau since 1980. Prior to that, select unincorporated communities were surveyed in the U.S. Census.

== List of census-designated places in Mississippi ==
CDP	County	Location of County	Population (2020)	Population (2010)	Population (2000)	Population (1990)	Population (1980)	Notes
Agricola	George		346	x	x	x	x	
Alcorn State University	Claiborne		1,120	1,107	x	x	x	
Arkabutla	Tate		285	x	x	x	x	
Arnold Line	Lamar		2,333	1,719	x	x	x	
Austin	Tunica		51	x	x	x	x	
Baxterville	Lamar		267	x	x	x	x	
Beechwood	Warren		3,469	3,426	x	x	x	
Benndale	George		65	x	x	x	x	
Benton	Yazoo		415	x	x	x	x	
Bethlehem	Marshall		319	x	x	x	x	
Big Point	Jackson		618	611	115	x	x	
Biggersville	Alcorn		205	x	x	x	x	
Bobo	Coahoma		118	x	x	x	x	
Bogue Chitto	Kemper • Neshoba		864	x	x	x	x	
Bogue Chitto	Lincoln		437	522	x	x	x	
Bolivar	Bolivar		39	x	x	x	x	
Bond	Stone		506	x	x	x	x	
Bovina	Warren		516	x	x	x	x	
Bridgetown	DeSoto		2,281	1,742	x	x	x	
Buckatunna	Wayne		383	516	x	x	x	
Chalybeate	Tippah		170	x	x	x	x	
Clara	Wayne		386	410	x	x	x	
Cleary	Rankin		1,688	1,544	x	x	x	
Cloverdale	Adams		557	645	x	x	x	
Collinsville	Lauderdale		1,984	1,948	1,823			
Columbus AFB	Lowndes		1,604	1,373	2,060			
Conehatta	Newton		1,376	1,342	997			
Darling	Quitman		154	226	x	x	x	
De Soto	Clarke		274	x	x	x	x	
DeLisle	Harrison		1,275	1,147	x	x	x	
Delta City	Sharkey		70	x	x	x	x	
Dennis	Tishomingo		172	x	x	x	x	
Dublin	Coahoma		24	x	x	x	x	
Dundee	Tunica		73	x	x	x	x	
Eagle Bend	Warren		296	x	x	x	x	
Eastabuchie	Forrest • Jones		187	x	x	x	x	
Elizabeth	Washington		127	x	x	x	x	
Elliott	Grenada		880	990	x	x	x	
Escatawpa	Jackson		3,254	3,722	3,566			
Eudora	DeSoto		386	x	x	x	x	
Farrell	Coahoma		200	218	x	x	x	
Fernwood	Pike		286	x	x	x	x	
Foxworth	Marion		523	603	x	x	x	
Glen Allan	Washington		298	x	x	x	x	
Glendale	Forrest		1,681	1,657	x	x	x	
Gluckstadt	Madison		3,208	x	x	x	x	Incorporated June 2021
Grace	Issaquena		77	x	x	x	x	
Gulf Hills	Jackson		8,526	7,144	5,900			
Gulf Park Estates	Jackson		5,972	5,719	4,272			
Hamilton	Monroe		404	457	x	x	x	
Harperville	Scott		250	x	x	x	x	
Helena	Jackson		983	1,184	778	x	x	
Henderson Point	Harrison		232	170	x	x	x	
Hermanville	Claiborne		692	x	x	x	x	
Hide-A-Way Lake	Pearl River		2,065	1,859	x	x	x	
Hillsboro	Scott		1,072	1,130	x	x	x	
Holcomb	Grenada		568	600	x	x	x	
Hurley	Jackson		1,557	1,551	985	x	x	
Independence	Tate		200	x	x	x	x	
Jacinto	Alcorn		52	x	x	x	x	
Kearney Park	Madison		1,048	1,054	x	x	x	
Kiln	Hancock		2,224	2,238	2,040			
Kirkville	Itawamba		308	x	x	x	x	
Kokomo	Marion		150	x	x	x	x	
Lakeview	DeSoto		299	x	x	x	x	
Lamar	Benton		39	x	x	x	x	
Latimer	Jackson							
Lauderdale	Lauderdale							
Leaf	Greene		62	x	x	x	x	
Longview	Oktibbeha		295	x	x	x	x	
Lyman	Harrison							
Lynchburg	DeSoto							
Meridian Station	Lauderdale							
Mississippi State	Oktibbeha				x	x	x	
Mississippi Valley State	Leflore				x	x	x	
Mooreville	Lee				x	x	x	
Morgantown	Adams				x	x	x	
Moselle	Jones		304	x	x	x	x	
Mount Pleasant	Marshall		293	x	x	x	x	
Nellieburg	Lauderdale							
New Hamilton	Monroe				x	x	x	
New Hope	Lowndes							
New Site	Prentiss		122	x	x	x	x	
Nicholson	Pearl River				x	x	x	
Nitta Yuma	Sharkey		8	x	x	x	x	
North Tunica	Tunica		8	x	x	x	x	
Oak Grove	Lamar		1,758	x	x	x	x	
Ovett	Jones		183	x	x	x	x	
Panther Burn	Sharkey		115	x	x	x	x	
Paris	Lafayette		163	x	x	x	x	
Pattison	Claiborne		176	x	x	x	x	
Pearl River	Neshoba							
Pearlington	Hancock							
Pheba	Clay		160	x	x	x	x	
Pleasant Hill	DeSoto		1,863	x	x	x	x	
Porterville	Kemper							
Randolph	Pontotoc		197	x	x	x	x	
Rawls Springs	Forrest				x	x	x	
Red Banks	Marshall		215	x	x	x	x	
Redwater	Leake		683					
Redwood	Warren		84	x	x	x	x	
Rena Lara	Coahoma		123	x	x	x	x	
Robinhood	Rankin				x	x	x	
Runnelstown	Perry		320	x	x	x	x	
Saucier	Harrison					x	x	
Scott	Bolivar		90	x	x	x	x	
Sharon	Jones				x	x	x	
Skene	Bolivar		210	x	x	x	x	
St. Martin	Jackson							
Standing Pine	Leake							
Stewart	Montgomery		99	x	x	x	x	
Stoneville	Washington		39	x	x	x	x	
Strayhorn	Tate		284	x	x	x	x	
Symonds	Bolivar		72	x	x	x	x	
Toomsuba	Lauderdale				x	x	x	
Tucker	Neshoba							
Tula	Lafayette		197	x	x	x	x	
Tunica Resorts	Tunica				x	x	x	
University	Lafayette				x	x	x	
Valley Park	Issaquena		71	x	x	x	x	
Van Vleet	Chickasaw		95	x	x	x	x	
Vancleave	Jackson							
Victoria	Marshall		1,066	x	x	x	x	
Wade	Jackson					x	x	
Waterford	Marshall		112	x	x	x	x	
West Hattiesburg	Lamar							
Wheeler	Prentiss		274	x	x	x	x	
White Oak	Tunica				x	x	x	
Winterville	Washington		96	x	x	x	x	

== Former census designated places in Mississippi ==
CDP	County	Location of County	Population (2020)	Population (2010)	Population (2000)	Population (1990)	Population (1980)	Notes
Byram	Hinds		x	x	7,386	x	x	Incorporated in 2009
North Gulfport	Harrison		x	x	x			Annexed to the city of Gulfport, Mississippi prior to the 2000 U.S. census
Orange Grove	Harrison		x	x	x			Annexed to the city of Gulfport, Mississippi prior to the 2000 U.S. census
Wool Market	Harrison		x	x	x			Annexed to the city of Biloxi, Mississippi prior to the 2000 U.S. census

== See also ==
- List of cities, towns, and villages in Mississippi
