= West Days, Mississippi =

- Unincorporated community
- Location within Mississippi Location within the United States
- Coordinates: 34°54′41″N 90°05′45″W
- Country: United States
- State: Mississippi
- County: DeSoto
- Elevation: 243 ft (74 m)
- Time zone: UTC-6 (Central (CST))
  - Summer (DST): UTC-5 (CDT)
- ZIP code: 38637
- Area code: 662
- GNIS feature ID: 690404

West Days is an unincorporated community located in DeSoto County, Mississippi, United States. West Days is 1 mile (1.6 km) west of Days and approximately 6 miles (9.7 km) south of Memphis along Mississippi Highway 301.
