= Bridgetown, Mississippi =

- Census-designated place
- Location within Mississippi
- Coordinates: 34°53′25″N 89°54′24″W
- Country: United States
- State: Mississippi
- County: Desoto

Area
  - Total: 2.27 sq mi (5.89 km^{2})
  - Land: 2.17 sq mi (5.62 km^{2})
  - Water: 0.10 sq mi (0.27 km^{2})
- Elevation: 374 ft (114 m)

Population (2020)
  - Total: 2,281
  - Density: 1,051.7/sq mi (406.06/km^{2})
- Time zone: UTC-6 (Central (CST))
  - Summer (DST): UTC-5 (CDT)
- ZIP code: 38651
- Area code: 662
- GNIS feature ID: 2586584

Bridgetown is an unincorporated community and census-designated place (CDP) in Desoto County, Mississippi, United States. As of the 2020 census, Bridgetown had a population of 2,281. Bridgetown is approximately 6 miles (10 km) east of Nesbit and 3.5 miles (5.6 km) south-southwest of Pleasant Hill.

== Demographics ==
Historical population
Census	Pop.	Note	%±
2010	1,742		—
2020	2,281		30.9%
U.S. Decennial Census

Bridgetown first appeared as a census designated place in the 2010 U.S. census.

=== Racial and ethnic composition ===
Bridgetown CDP, Mississippi – Racial and ethnic composition Note: the US Census treats Hispanic/Latino as an ethnic category. This table excludes Latinos from the racial categories and assigns them to a separate category. Hispanics/Latinos may be of any race.
Race / Ethnicity (NH = Non-Hispanic)	Pop 2010	Pop 2020	% 2010	% 2020
White alone (NH)	1,666	2,040	95.64%	89.43%
Black or African American alone (NH)	29	89	1.66%	3.90%
Native American or Alaska Native alone (NH)	9	3	0.52%	0.13%
Asian alone (NH)	9	10	0.52%	0.44%
Native Hawaiian or Pacific Islander alone (NH)	0	0	0.00%	0.00%
Other race alone (NH)	0	11	0.00%	0.48%
Mixed race or Multiracial (NH)	12	76	0.69%	3.33%
Hispanic or Latino (any race)	17	52	0.98%	2.28%
Total	1,742	2,281	100.00%	100.00%

=== 2020 census ===
As of the 2020 census, Bridgetown had a population of 2,281. The median age was 41.5 years. 25.7% of residents were under the age of 18 and 20.3% of residents were 65 years of age or older. For every 100 females there were 84.4 males, and for every 100 females age 18 and over there were 80.3 males age 18 and over.

86.1% of residents lived in urban areas, while 13.9% lived in rural areas.

There were 783 households in Bridgetown, of which 41.4% had children under the age of 18 living in them. Of all households, 66.9% were married-couple households, 10.3% were households with a male householder and no spouse or partner present, and 19.0% were households with a female householder and no spouse or partner present. About 15.6% of all households were made up of individuals and 8.1% had someone living alone who was 65 years of age or older.

There were 803 housing units, of which 2.5% were vacant. The homeowner vacancy rate was 0.3% and the rental vacancy rate was 11.9%.

Racial composition as of the 2020 census
Race	Number	Percent
White	2,051	89.9%
Black or African American	89	3.9%
American Indian and Alaska Native	7	0.3%
Asian	10	0.4%
Native Hawaiian and Other Pacific Islander	0	0.0%
Some other race	15	0.7%
Two or more races	109	4.8%
