= Mississippi Highway 305 =

Highway in Mississippi

Mississippi Highway 305

Route information
- Maintained by Lafayette County and MDOT

Southern segment
- Length: 2.132 mi (3.431 km)
- South end: Sardis Lake boat launch
- North end: MS 310 near Teckville

Northern segment
- Length: 26.521 mi (42.681 km)
- South end: MS 4 near Looxahoma
- Major intersections: I-269 / MS 304 in Lewisburg; US 78 in Olive Branch
- North end: State Line Road / Riverdale Road at the Tennessee state line near Olive Branch

Location
- Country: United States
- State: Mississippi
- Counties: Lafayette, DeSoto, Tate

Highway system
- Mississippi State Highway System; Interstate; US; State
← MS 304	→ MS 306

Mississippi Highway 305 (MS 305) is a north–south highway in Lafayette, DeSoto, and Tate counties. An unsigned segment runs from the north shore of Sardis Lake in Teckville to MS 310. The main segment runs from MS 4, just east of the community of Looxahoma, north through eastern DeSoto and Tate counties to its northern terminus at the Mississippi/Tennessee state line.

== Route description ==
The southern segment of MS 305 is not signed nor maintained by the state; it is instead maintained by Lafayette County as County Route 517 (CR 517). The road begins in Teckville at a boat launch for Sardis Lake and heads northwest through a wooded area past many small houses. This segment ends at an intersection with MS 310 and CR 515 at a fire station and small market.

The signed portions of MS 305 begins as a two-lane highway at MS 4 east of the community of Looxahoma. From there, the route runs north through the community of Independence to the Desoto/Tate county line. From the Desoto/Tate county line, the route continues north through the community of Cockrum and crosses the Coldwater River before passing through the communities of Lewisburg and Cedarview. In the Lewisburg area, MS 305 intersects with Interstate 269 at a diamond interchange. MS 305 continues into Olive Branch and widens to five lanes just before the intersection with Church Road. MS 305 then passes through a grade-separated interchange with U.S. Route 78 (US 78). As it approaches downtown Olive Branch, the route is signed as Cockrum Road.

After an interchange with MS 302, the route is signed as Germantown Road. MS 305 terminates at State Line Road, but continues into Shelby County, Tennessee as Riverdale Road.

== Major intersections ==
County	Location	mi	km	Destinations	Notes
Lafayette	Teckville	0.000	0.000	Sardis Lake boat launch	Southern terminus
Lafayette		2.132	3.431	MS 310 / CR 515	Northern terminus of southern segment
Gap in route
Tate		0.000	0.000	MS 4 – Holly Springs, Senatobia	Southern terminus of northern segment
Tate	Independence	5.560	8.948	MS 306 west / Mount Zion Road – Coldwater	Eastern terminus of MS 306
Desoto	Lewisburg	17.883– 18.035	28.780– 29.025	I-269 / MS 304 – Tunica, Collierville	I-269 exit 9
Desoto	Olive Branch	23.034– 23.291	37.070– 37.483	US 78 – Memphis, Tupelo	Interchange; US 78 exit 4
Desoto	Olive Branch	24.505– 24.986	39.437– 40.211	MS 302 to US 78	Interchange
Desoto	Olive Branch	26.521	42.681	Stateline Road / Riverdale Road - Memphis	Northern terminus; Tennessee state line; road continues north as Riverdale Road
1.000 mi = 1.609 km; 1.000 km = 0.621 mi
