= Thomas McCain =

American politician from Mississippi

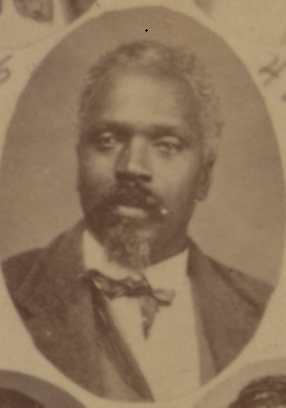

Member of the Mississippi House of Representatives

Member of the Mississippi House of Representatives
- In office 1872–1875

Personal details
- Born: c. 1827 Tennessee, United States
- Party: Republican

Thomas McCain (born c. 1827) was an American politician from DeSoto County, Mississippi. An African-American officeholder during the Reconstruction era, he represented DeSoto County in the Mississippi House of Representatives from 1872 to 1875 and was appointed lieutenant colonel of the county militia.

== Early life ==
McCain was born in Tennessee. By 1870 he was living in DeSoto County, Mississippi, where federal census records list him with his wife, Tabitha, and their children.

== Career ==
He represented DeSoto County in the Mississippi House of Representatives from 1872 to 1875. He was an officer in the county militia.

== Personal life ==
He was married and had children.

== See also ==
- African American officeholders from the end of the Civil War until before 1900
