= Cedarview, Mississippi =

- Unincorporated community
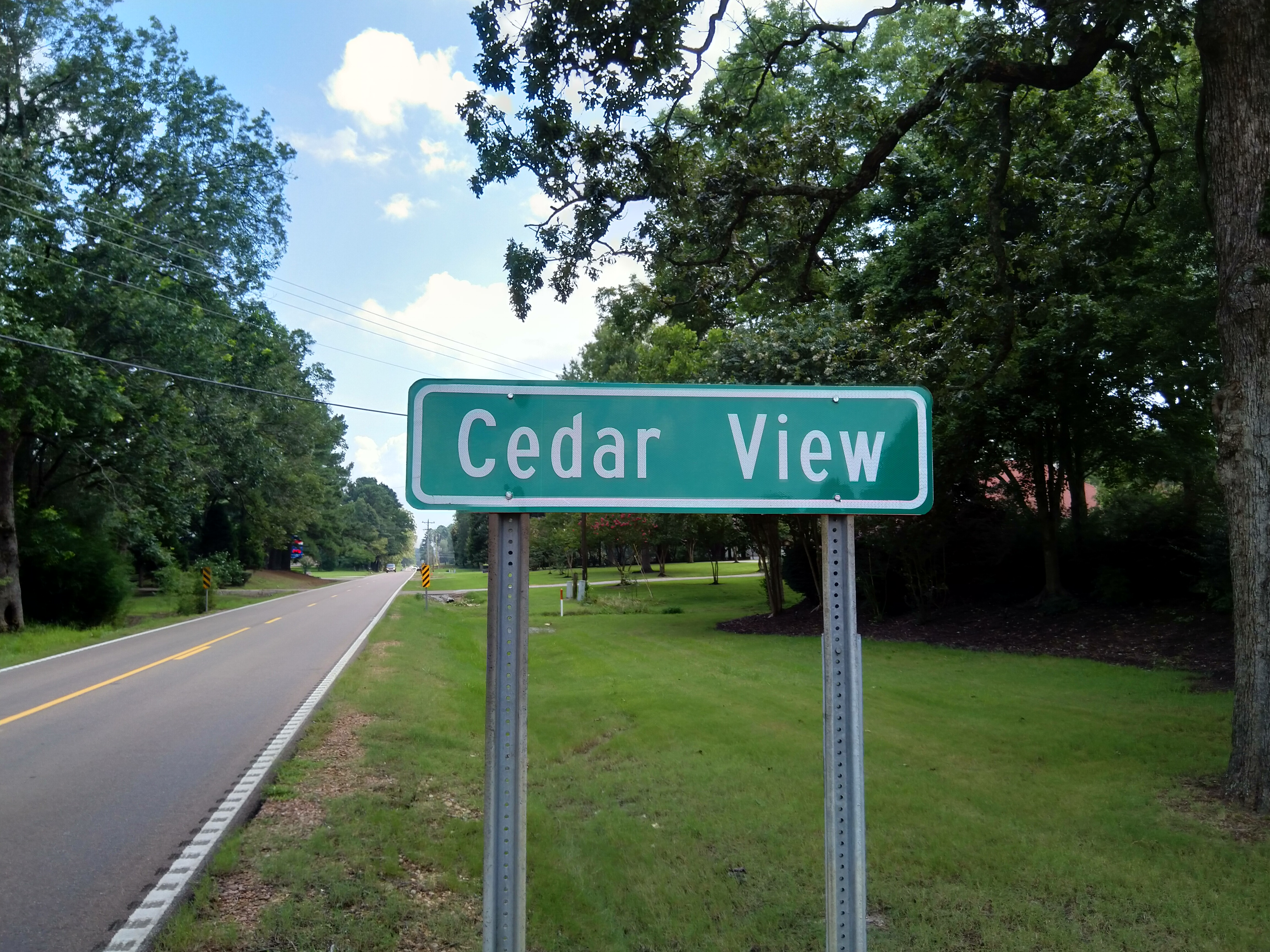
- Highway sign in Cedar View located on Mississippi Highway 305

- Location within Mississippi Location within the United States
- Coordinates: 34°54′49″N 89°45′55″W
- Country: United States
- State: Mississippi
- County: Desoto
- Elevation: 387 ft (118 m)
- Time zone: UTC-6 (Central (CST))
  - Summer (DST): UTC-5 (CDT)
- ZIP code: 38654
- Area code: 662
- GNIS feature ID: 6902242

Cedarview is an unincorporated community located in Desoto County, Mississippi, United States, south of Olive Branch along Mississippi Highway 305.
