= Carl Allen =

Carl Allen may refer to:

- Carl Allen (cornerback) (1955–2021), American football player
- Carl Allen (tailback) (1920–2008), American football player
- Carl Allen (drummer) (born 1961), jazz drummer
- Carl C. Allen (1888–1965), American pharmacist, farmer, and politician in Mississippi
- Carl Ferdinand Allen (1811–1871), Danish historian
- Carl Meredith Allen (1925–1994), American merchant marine; associated with the Philadelphia Experiment
- Karl Allen (1931–2015), American neo-Nazi and bookstore owner
