= Norfolk, Mississippi =

- Unincorporated community
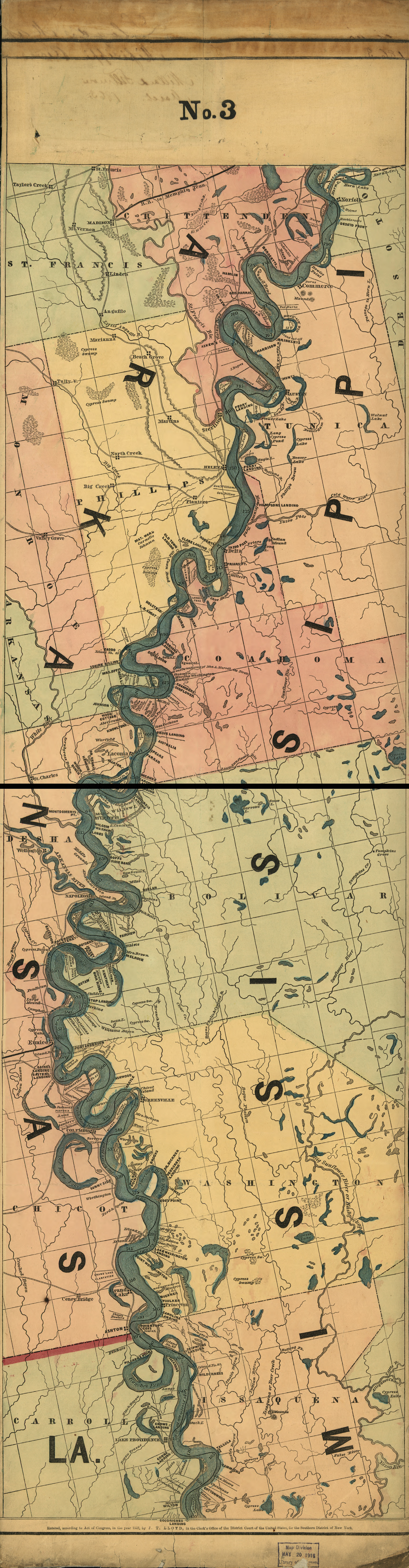
- 1862 map showing Norfolk

- Location within Mississippi Location within the United States
- Coordinates: 34°57′05″N 90°13′50″W
- Country: United States
- State: Mississippi
- County: Desoto
- Elevation: 210 ft (64 m)
- Time zone: UTC-6 (Central (CST))
  - Summer (DST): UTC-5 (CDT)
- GNIS feature ID: 692114

Norfolk is an unincorporated community located in Desoto County, Mississippi, United States. Norfolk Landing (also called Helm's Landing), located a short distance west of Norfolk, was the community's port on the Mississippi River.

== History ==
Norfolk began as a steamboat landing on a plantation belonging to a man named Helms. In 1854, Norfolk was a small village.

Norfolk Landing was the first port south of the Mississippi-Tennessee border. In 1862, the newly formed Confederate States of America established a customs office there, and all passing vessels were required to stop and provide a list of cargo. Regarding this action, historian Marion Bragg wrote:

Men who had previously been neutral and disinterested in the issues which had aroused others in the North were suddenly enraged. Free navigation of the Mississippi was a natural birthright of every American, the westerners believed, and they would gladly fight to death for it. The idea of a "foreign power" dictating the terms upon which they could navigate "their river" was unthinkable.

Norfolk had a post office from 1854 to 1913.

== Hernando DeSoto Park ==
Norfolk Landing has been converted into a 41-acre (17 ha) public park called "Hernando DeSoto Park", which features a hiking/walking trail, river overlook, picnic area, parking and boat launch. The park is the only place in DeSoto County with public access to the Mississippi River.
