= Days, Mississippi =

- Unincorporated community
- Location within Mississippi Location within the United States
- Coordinates: 34°54′40″N 90°04′40″W
- Country: United States
- State: Mississippi
- County: DeSoto
- Elevation: 312 ft (95 m)
- Time zone: UTC-6 (Central (CST))
  - Summer (DST): UTC-5 (CDT)
- ZIP code: 38637
- Area code: 662
- GNIS feature ID: 691802

Days is an unincorporated community located in DeSoto County, Mississippi, United States. Days is 1 mile (1.6 km) east of West Days and 6.6 miles (10.6 km) south of Horn Lake along Fogg Road.
