= Mid-South (region) =

Region of the United States

Coordinates: 35.5°N 89°W

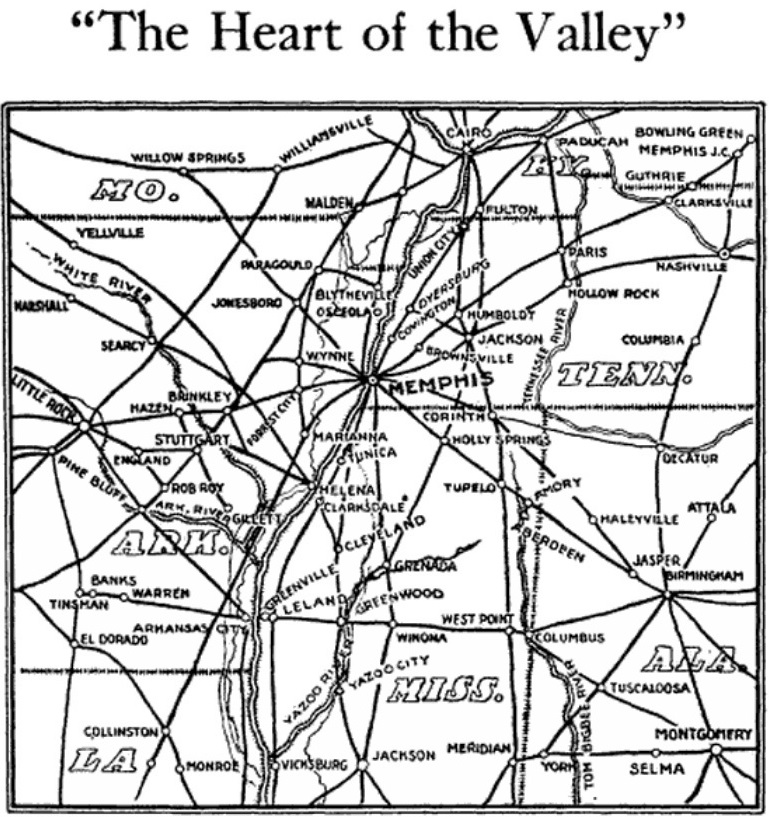
Map of the "Mid-South" as defined in The Mid-South and Its Builders (1920).

The Mid-South is an informally defined region of the United States in the Southern United States, usually thought to be anchored by the Memphis metropolitan area. Exact definitions vary widely and consist of at least West Tennessee, North Mississippi, Northeast Arkansas, Southern Missouri, and Missouri Bootheel at a minimum.

The region is bordered by the Ozarks to the north and west, by Appalachia to the east, and the Deep South to the south.

Although the region has no formally established boundaries, the designation has been used by various businesses and institutions generally operating in the region. In 1920, journalist C.P.J. Mooney equated the region with the Mississippi River Valley, centered in Memphis, and described by advocates as "the richest agricultural region in the world". Mooney delineated the region as "covering West Kentucky, West Tennessee, part of the Tennessee River Valley in Alabama, the northern half of Mississippi, the Eastern half of Arkansas and southeast Missouri". Southern Illinois (especially Cairo, shown on the map) and Southwestern Indiana are also occasionally included in this region.

Victory University, located in Memphis, was originally named the Mid-South Bible Center when it was incorporated in 1944, and was thereafter renamed to the Mid-South Bible Institute in 1948, and to the Mid-South Bible College in 1960. From 1981 to 1987, a Mid-South Business Journal was also in publication. The Mid-South Conference is an NAIA sports conference with member schools in the region.
