= Mississippi Highway 306 =

Highway in Mississippi

Mississippi Highway 306
- MS 306 highlighted in pink

Route information
- Maintained by MDOT
- Length: 9.691 mi (15.596 km)
- Existed: c. 1952–present

Major junctions
- West end: MS 304 Scenic / US 51 in Coldwater
- MS 304 Scenic / I-55 in Coldwater
- East end: MS 305 near Independence

Location
- Country: United States
- State: Mississippi
- Counties: Tate

Highway system
- Mississippi State Highway System; Interstate; US; State
← MS 305	→ MS 308

Mississippi Highway 306 (MS 306) is a state highway in northern Mississippi. The route starts at U.S. Route 51 (US 51) in Coldwater, and it travels eastward to an interchange at Interstate 55 (I-55) on the northern edge of the town. The road continues eastward across northern Tate County and ends at MS 305 near Independence. MS 306 was designated in 1952, and it was constructed in 1953 from US 51 to MS 305. The route was paved in asphalt by 1956, and an interchange was built at I-55 by 1967.

== Route description ==
Traffic volume on Mississippi Highway 306
Location	Volume
West of Hill Road	7,500
East of Golden Way	3,700
West of Antioch Road	2,900
East of Independence Road	3,100
Data was measured in 2016 in terms of AADT; Source:

All of the route is located inside northern Tate County. MS 306 is legally defined in Mississippi Code § 65-3-3, and all of it is maintained by the Mississippi Department of Transportation (MDOT), as part of the Mississippi State Highway System.

MS 306 starts at the intersection of US 51, MS 304 Scenic, and Ilene Saunders Street in Coldwater. MS 304 Scenic and MS 306 travel eastward across the northern part of the town, crossing over the Illinois Central Railroad in a forested area, and it intersects I-55 at a diamond interchange (Exit 271) east of Hill Road. The concurrency with MS 304 ends as it travels northward along I-55. Surrounded by farmland, MS 306 leaves the corporate limits of Coldwater east of Hardin Road. East of Crestfield Road, the road bends north briefly, before continuing along the beat line at Palestine Road. Near Scott Road, the route crosses over Leake Creek, and it intersects Antioch Road in the unincorporated community of Antioch. Less than two miles (3.2 km) later, MS 306 continues eastward and intersects Bowman Town Road in Bowman. The road then crosses Buttermilk Creek near Independence Road and Little Beartail Creek near Willie Turner Road. The route ends at MS 305 near Independence, and the road continues eastward as Mount Zion Road, as it travels to Thyatira.

== History ==
In January 1952, the first construction projects of the year were announced by the Mississippi State Highway Department. One project was MS 306, which included grading, drainage and culverts, and gravel surfacing. By 1953, the gravel road opened, connecting from US 51 to MS 305. Another project was announced in 1954, with asphalt surfacing and more drainage and culverts. By 1956, all of the route was paved, and MS 305 was extended past MS 306. In 1960, I-55 was proposed to intersect MS 306, and construction began by 1962. In 1967, an interchange was built at I-55, and no significant changes have been made to the route since.

== Major intersections ==
The entire route is in Tate County.

Location	mi	km	Destinations	Notes
Coldwater	0.0	0.0	MS 304 Scenic / US 51 – Coldwater, Arkabutla Dam, Hernando Point	Western terminus; western end of MS 304 Scenic concurrency
Coldwater	0.8– 0.9	1.3– 1.4	MS 304 Scenic / I-55 – Memphis, Grenada	Diamond interchange; eastern end of MS 304 Scenic concurrency; I-55 exit 271
Independence	9.7	15.6	MS 305 – Lewisburg, Olive Branch	Eastern terminus
1.000 mi = 1.609 km; 1.000 km = 0.621 mi: Concurrency terminus
