= Nathaniel Lamson Howard =

American railroad executive

- Born: March 9, 1884; Fairfield, Iowa
- Died: May 1949 (aged 65); Pasadena, California

Nathaniel Lamson Howard (1884–1949) was an American railroad executive. He graduated from the United States Military Academy and for his meritorious service commanding military railroad engineers during World War I, he was awarded the Légion d'honneur. Upon his return, he worked as an official for the Chicago, Burlington and Quincy Railroad and the Chicago Union Station Company before being elected to the presidency of the Chicago Great Western Railway in 1925.

== Notes ==
1. Chicago Daily Tribune May 8, 1949.

| Preceded by Samuel Morse Felton Jr. | President of Chicago Great Western Railway; 1925 – 1929 | Succeeded by Victor V. Boatner |
