= Maywood Beach =

Water park in Olive Branch, Mississippi

Coordinates: 34.970508°N 89.846305°W

- Interactive map of Maywood Beach
- Slogan: The Beach within Reach
- Location: Olive Branch, Mississippi, United States
- Opened: 1931
- Closed: 2003
- Previous names: Lake Shahkoka
- Operating season: Memorial Day to Labor Day
- Water slides: 2 slides, 3 playgrounds & 2 water rides water slides

Maywood Beach was a water park located in Olive Branch, Mississippi, just across the Mississippi state line from Memphis, Tennessee.

== History ==
It was opened by Maurice and May Woodson on July 4, 1931. The Woodsons were Memphians who were looking for a change of pace from city life. Maurice Woodson was a cotton linter and president of Woodson Brothers, Inc., a company that he owned with his brothers Edward and R. Peyton Woodson. Some time in the late 1920s, Maurice was told by his doctor that he must give up his business for his health's sake. Soon after the couple purchased 400 acres (1.6 km^{2}) of land in DeSoto County, Mississippi.

On the property was a clear, spring fed lake. With the help of a mule team, they dug the lake out and lined the bottom with several hundred tons of white sand imported from Destin, Florida. Then, tapping down into a natural artesian water basin below the ground, they filled it with cold, clear water, which eventually fed into two other lakes on the property.

Lake Shahkoka, as it was called, after a Chickasaw Indian who once lived on the land, soon had picnic tables, barbecue pits, pavilions, a bowling alley, and a mini golf course, as well as playgrounds, a snack bar and tearoom at the Maywood swimming pool (It had been renamed after May Woodson). These amenities were added as the Woodson's sold getaway homes around their property.

In 1949, Jesse Spiceland began managing Maywood Swimming Pool, and, in 1956, purchased the business from Woodson. Mr. Spiceland operated Maywood during its formative years until selling it in 1987.

The pool was a great success; Memphians came from opening day in May to its close in September. It became a surrogate beach for Memphians longing for the ocean and hosted TV commercials for Memphis-based Coppertone, publicity photos for beauty queens, weddings, baptisms, church picnics, parachutists, class reunions, and corporate gatherings. There was a pavilion on site which was a popular dance arena from the 1930s onward, and Elvis Presley, Jerry Lee Lewis, Johnny Cash and a host of others played there early in their careers.

For more than half a century, Maywood remained largely unchanged. It was marketed as a "Swimming beach;" it was not called a "Water park" until some radio ads started calling it that in the 1990s. Water slides were added over the years, but the clear lake remained spring-fed and was clear enough to see your feet while standing in five feet of water.

== Closing ==
The unexpected news that Maywood was closing came from then owner Hugh Armistead. He blamed higher insurance costs as he explained in the Memphis newspaper, The Commercial Appeal. The lake and surrounding property were turned into a private residential development. The park closed in July 2003.
