= Carl C. Allen =

American pharmacist and politician from Mississippi

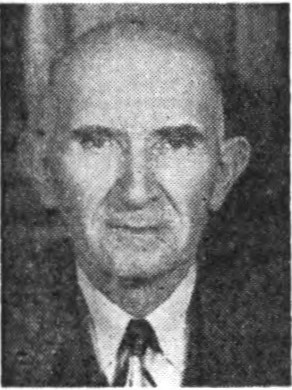
- c. 1952

Member of the Mississippi State Senate from the 35th district
- In office January 1944 – January 1952
- Preceded by: J. C. Lauderdale
- Succeeded by: W. F. Turman

Member of the Mississippi House of Representatives from the DeSoto County district
- In office January 1952 – January 1956
- In office January 1940 – January 1944
- In office January 1932 – January 1936

Personal details
- Born: November 7, 1888 Cockrum, Mississippi, U.S.
- Died: April 3, 1965 (aged 76) Cockrum, Mississippi, U.S.
- Party: Democratic

Carl Cochran Allen (November 7, 1888 - April 3, 1965) was an American pharmacist, farmer, and Democratic politician. He represented DeSoto County in the Mississippi State Senate from 1944 to 1952, and in the Mississippi House of Representatives from 1932 to 1936, from 1940 to 1944, and from 1952 to 1956.

== Biography ==
Carl Cochran Allen was born on November 7, 1888, in Cockrum, Mississippi. He had three sisters, named Sadie, Blanch, and Julia. He was a druggist by profession. He was also a farmer and a dairyman, and served as onetime president of the DeSoto County Farm Bureau.

=== 1931-1940 ===
In 1931, Allen, still a resident of Cockrum, was elected (alongside E. J. Pollard) to represent DeSoto County as a Democrat in the Mississippi House of Representatives for the term spanning from 1932 to 1936. In 1939, Allen was re-elected to the House and served a second nonconsecutive term spanning from 1936 to 1940.

=== 1943-1956 ===
In 1943, Allen was elected to represent the 35th District (consisting of DeSoto County) in the Mississippi State Senate for the term spanning from 1944 to 1948. During this term, Allen served on the following committees: Highway Financing; Finance; Fees & Salaries; Agriculture, Commerce & Manufacturing; Humane & Benevolent; Levees; and Penitentiaries & Prisons. In 1947, Allen was re-elected to the Senate to serve the term spanning from 1948 to 1952. During this term, Allen was the chairman of the Agriculture, Commerce, & Manufacturing committee. Allen also served on the following committees: Claims; Conservation of Natural Resources; Fees & Salaries; Forestry; Levees; Penitentiary & Prisons; and Public Health & Quarantine. In 1951, Allen was re-elected to the House (alongside I. V. Ross) and served a third nonconsecutive term spanning from 1952 to 1956.

=== Later life ===
Allen died at his home in Cockrum at 1 AM on April 3, 1965.

== Personal life ==
Allen was active as a lay leader in the Cockrum Methodist Church, in which he was the superintendent and steward of the Sunday school. Allen was also a member of the Freemasons. He was married to Ruth M. Allen. They had two sons, Robert C. and Thomas M., and five grandchildren by 1965.
