= Victor V. Boatner =

American railroad executive (1881–1950)

Victor Vincent Boatner
- Born: May 6, 1881; Bethlehem, Mississippi
- Died: February 11, 1950 (aged 68); Chicago, Illinois

Victor Vincent Boatner (May 6, 1881 – February 11, 1950) was an American railroad executive. He was born in Bethlehem, Mississippi, and attended Mississippi College.

Boatner began his career in Greenville, Mississippi in 1901, working as a trainmaster's clerk on the Yazoo and Mississippi Valley Railroad (part of the Illinois Central Railroad). Boatner rose through the ranks of the Illinois Central until 1921, when he was elected president of the Peoria and Pekin Union Railway. He accepted the presidency of the Chicago Great Western Railway in 1929 and headed that railroad until his ouster in 1931. He worked as a railway consultant until his death in Chicago in 1950.

Preceded by	President of Peoria and Pekin Union Railway; 1921 –	Succeeded by
Preceded by Nathaniel Lamson Howard	President of Chicago Great Western Railway; 1929 – 1931	Succeeded by Patrick H. Joyce
