= Harold W. Burtness =

American railroad executive

- Born: November 16, 1897; Chicago, Illinois
- Died: May 1978 (aged 80); Urbana, Illinois

Harold William Burtness (November 16, 1897 – May 1978) was an American railroad executive. Born in Chicago, Illinois, in 1897, he studied business at LaSalle Extension University, and began his career as a secretary for the Chicago, Milwaukee, St. Paul and Pacific Railroad in 1914. The following year, he moved into an executive assistant position with the Pennsylvania Railroad before coming to the Chicago Great Western Railway in 1922. He steadily rose through the ranks there, and was elected to a vice-presidency of the CGW in February 1941 and took over the presidency of the railroad from the ailing Patrick H. Joyce on May 21, 1946. At that time, at age 48, he was one of the youngest railway executives in the country. He resigned as President effective September 1, 1948.

Preceded by Patrick H. Joyce	President of Chicago Great Western Railway; 1946 – 1948	Succeeded by Grant Stauffer
