= Love, Mississippi =

- Unincorporated community
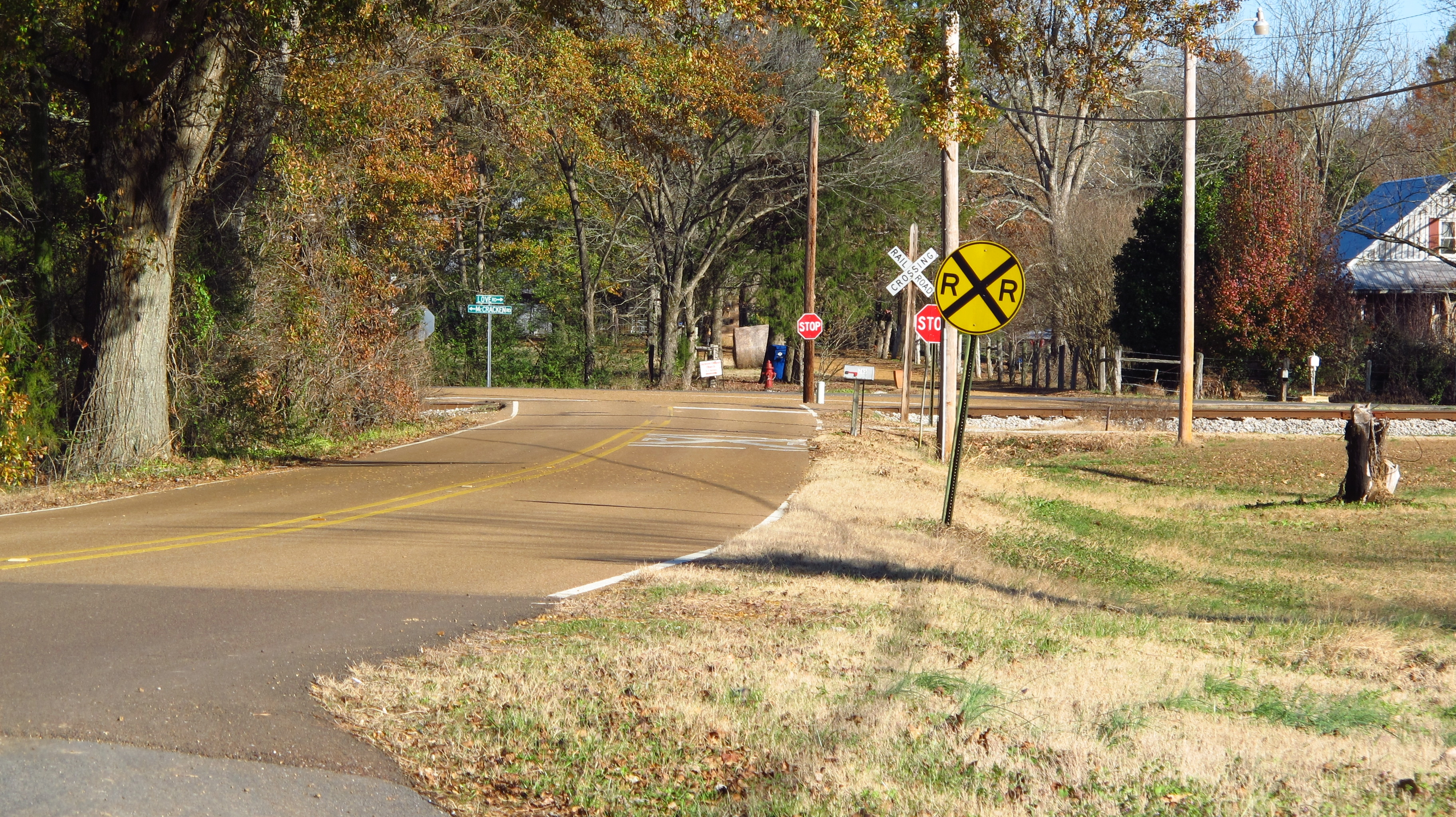
- Love Road and McCracken Road in Love

- Location within Mississippi Location within the United States
- Coordinates: 34°45′12″N 89°58′12″W
- Country: United States
- State: Mississippi
- County: Desoto
- Elevation: 260 ft (80 m)
- Time zone: UTC-6 (Central (CST))
  - Summer (DST): UTC-5 (CDT)
- ZIP code: 38611
- Area code: 662
- GNIS feature ID: 690327

Love (also Love's and Love's Station) is an unincorporated community located in Desoto County, Mississippi, United States. Love is approximately 6 miles (9.7 km) south of Hernando along U.S. Route 51 or I-55.

== History ==
The community was named after W.R. Love, a prominent physician and planter.

The town was incorporated as "Love's" in 1878.

"Love's Station" was a stop on the Illinois Central Railroad, built in the 1850s between Memphis, Tennessee and Grenada. In the early 1900s, the community had a general store. There was also a post office.

== Love today ==
The community today is largely agricultural, with some homes located along nearby roads. The Love Cemetery and Old Love Cemetery are located here, as well as the Love First Baptist Church. Little remains of the original settlement.

The Love Volunteer Fire Department is responsible for protecting a 40 sq mi (100 km^{2}) portion of southwest Desoto County. The department also operates a Junior Firefighter Program through the Boy Scouts.

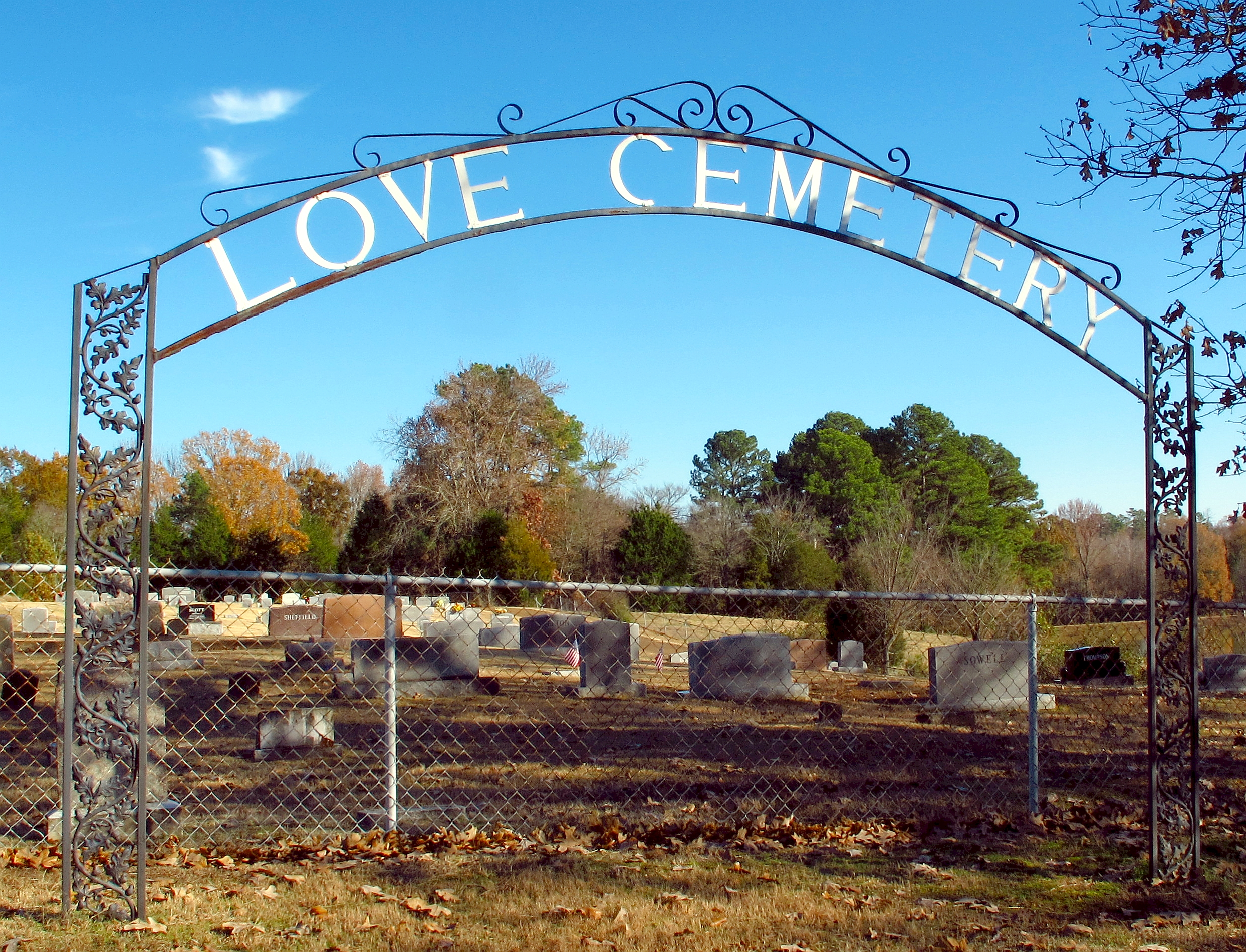
Love Cemetery

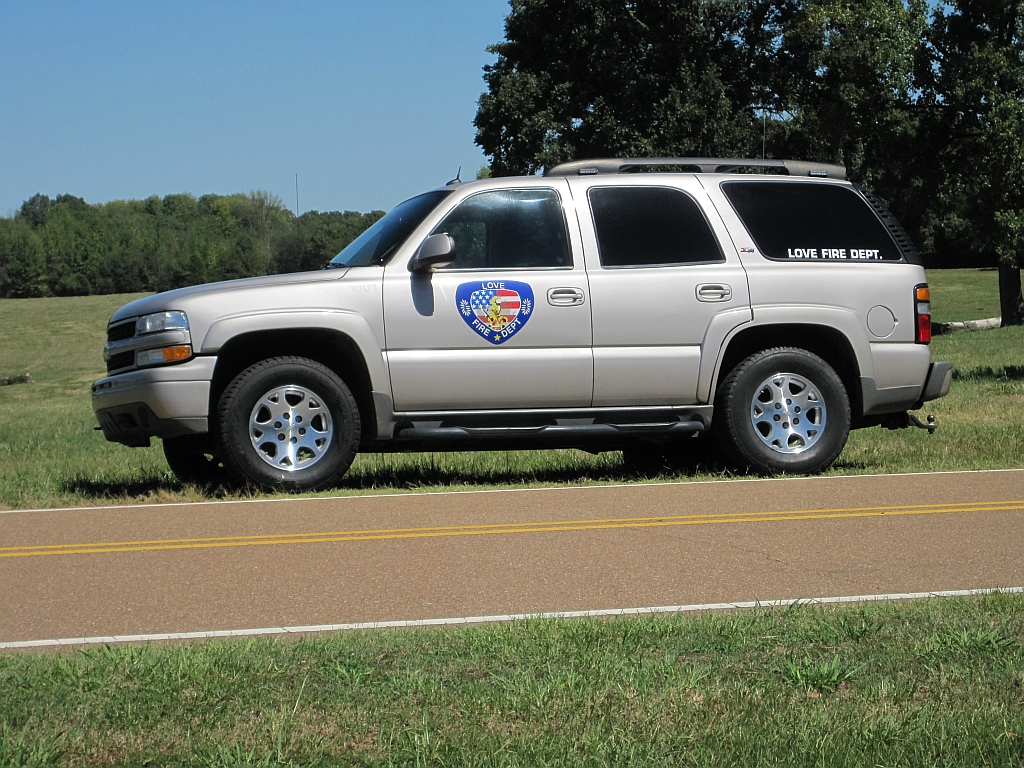
Love Volunteer Fire Department vehicle

== Notable people ==
- Will Dockery, founder of the Dockery Plantation.
- Slim Love, professional baseball player.
