= Slim Love =

American baseball player (1890–1942)

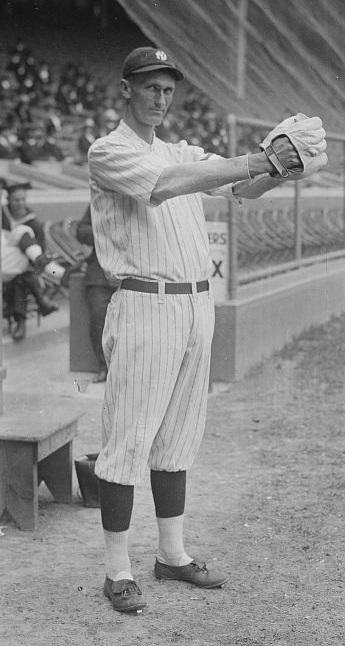
- Love with the New York Yankees, 1918
- Pitcher
- Born: August 1, 1890; Love, Mississippi, U.S.
- Died: November 30, 1942 (aged 52); Memphis, Tennessee, U.S.
- Batted: Left Threw: Left

MLB debut
- September 8, 1913, for the Washington Senators

Last MLB appearance
- April 18, 1920, for the Detroit Tigers

MLB statistics
- Win–loss record: 28–21
- Earned run average: 3.04
- Strikeouts: 251
- Stats at Baseball Reference

Teams
- Washington Senators (1913); New York Yankees (1916–1918); Detroit Tigers (1919–1920)

Edward Haughton "Slim" Love (August 1, 1890 – November 30, 1942) was an American professional baseball pitcher from approximately 1910 to 1930. He played six seasons in Major League Baseball for the Washington Senators (1913), New York Yankees (1916–1918), and Detroit Tigers (1919–1920). Over six major league seasons, Love compiled a 28–21 record with a 3.04 earned run average (ERA). He also played in the minor leagues, including stints with the Los Angeles Angels (1914–1915) and Dallas Marines/Steers (1922–1928).

Love's nickname was based on his large, lean frame, at 6 ft 7.5 in (2.02 m) and 195 pounds (88 kg). Upon his debut, Love became the tallest pitcher in major league history, surpassing Miles Main who was 6 foot 6 when he played from 1914 through 1918. Love remained the tallest pitcher in major league history until Johnny Gee made his debut in 1939 at six feet, nine inches.

== Early years ==
Love was born in 1890 in Love, Mississippi, located 30 miles (48 km) south of Memphis, Tennessee. He was the son of Columbus "C. C." Love and Mary Homing, and the grandson of Henry Chapel "H. C." Love and Rebecca S. (Houghton) Love.

== Baseball player ==
=== Minor leagues ===
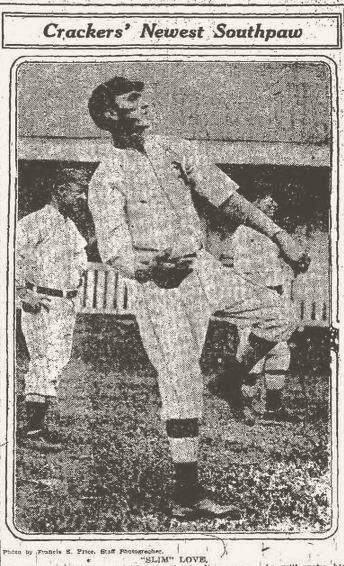
Love with the Atlanta Crackers in 1913

Love began his professional baseball career in 1912 with the Memphis Turtles (later renamed the Chickasaws). According to a 1913 story published by The Washington Post, Love landed with the Turtles "on account of his bucolic disposition and odd appearance." Love travelled to Memphis and walked into a cafe owned by a friend of Turtles manager Bill Bernhard. Love ordered a drink for himself and invited all of the patrons at the bar to join him. He then boasted that he had come to Memphis from his home in Mississippi "to pitch Memphis into a pennant." The proprietor introduced Love to Bernhard who agreed to give Love a tryout. In his first appearance for Memphis, a spring exhibition game against the Cleveland Indians, Love struck out Nap Lajoie with the bases loaded. Love was then sent by Memphis to the Greenwood, Mississippi club in the Cotton States League. After a short stay in Greenwood, he returned to Memphis and was released.

At the start of the 1913 season, Love signed with the Selma Centralites of the Cotton States League. Love appeared in 28 games for Selma, including a no-hitter, and a five-game streak in which he allowed no runs and 19 hits. At the end of July 1913, Love was acquired by the Atlanta Crackers of the Southern Association. On August 22, 1913, he pitched a shutout against the Billikens, facing only 22 batters in seven innings—one more than the minimum of 21. The Atlanta Constitution, referring to Love as "the human office building", noted that Love smiled throughout the game and "mixed his overhand drop with a side-arm slow ball that baffled the best of the Billikens." In eight games for the Crackers, Love compiled a 2-3 record.

=== Washington Senators ===
At the end of the 1913 minor league season, the Washington Senators purchased Love from the Atlanta Crackers. Love made his major league debut for the Senators on September 8, 1913, at age 23. In his debut, Love pitched one inning against the New York Yankees and allowed no hits, no bases on balls, and no runs, and struck out one batter. Love became the tallest pitcher in major league history, surpassing Hippo Vaughn who stood six feet, four inches. Love remained the tallest pitcher in major league history for 69 years until Stefan Wever made his debut in 1982 at six feet, eight inches. He compiled a 1–0 record and 1.62 ERA in five games and 16-2/3 inning pitched.

=== Los Angeles Angels ===
In January 1914, Washington owner Clark Griffith sent Love to the Los Angeles Angels of the Pacific Coast League on condition that the Senators would have the option to call him back if his work justified it. In 1914, Love compiled a 10–9 record and 2.39 ERA in 37 games for the Angels. At the end of the season, Sporting Life reported that Love, referred to as "the human giraffe", "stood second among the twirlers of the Pacific Coast League", and raised questions as to whether Griffith would recall him to the majors in 1915, though Love was not included on the Senators' reserve list.

In 1915, Love remained in Los Angeles. In February 1915, Sporting Life reported that "the altitudinous twirler" had "at last acquired a curve" and had been "practicing industriously all Winter to master this delivery." The effort paid off, as Love had perhaps the best season of his career in 1915, compiling a 23–15 record and 1.95 ERA in 59 games and 359.1 innings pitched.

=== New York Yankees ===
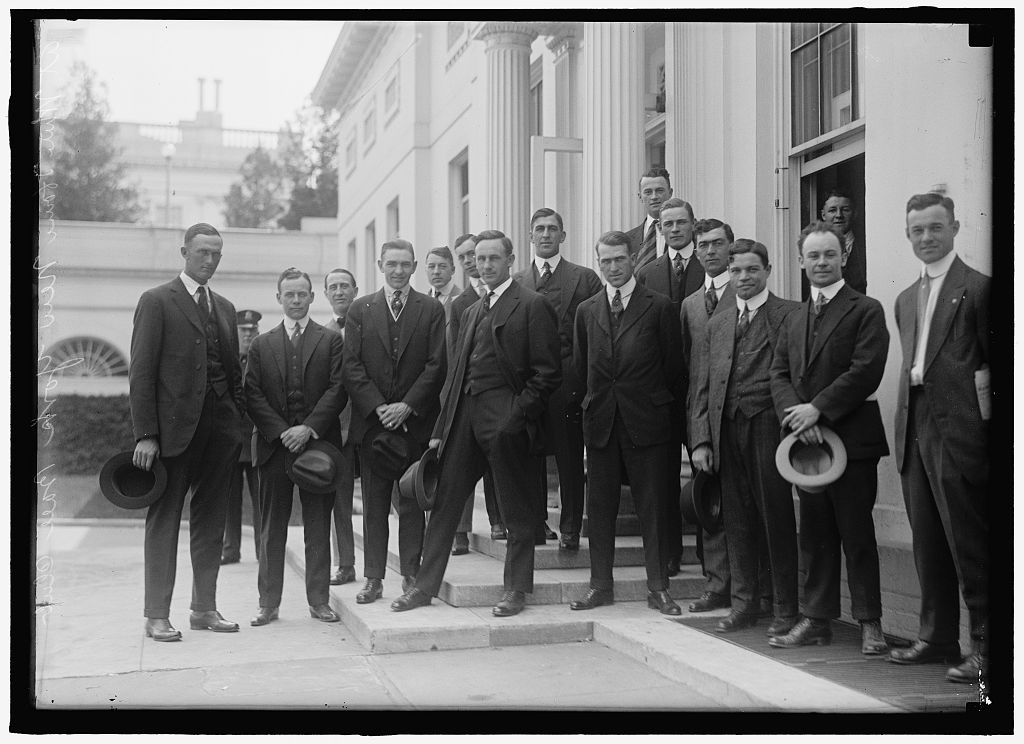
Love (far left) with other member of the 1916 Yankees at the White House.

In September 1915, Love, referred to as "the 'Eiffel tower' slabster of the Los Angeles club", was drafted by the New York Yankees in exchange for $2,300 ($73,199 in current dollar terms). At the time, Sporting Life reported that the Yankees had "obtained the tallest pitcher in captivity" at six feet seven and a half inches tall. When Love returned his signed contract to the Yankees, Sporting Life opined that his addition "will go a long way toward putting New York on the map" and made mention of his "special ball, known as the aeroplane bomb, as it seems to descend to the batter from somewhere in the celestial region."

In 1916, Love appeared in 20 games for the Yankees, all but one as a relief pitcher, and compiled a 2–0 record with a 4.91 ERA. Love also allowed 23 bases on balls in 47.2 innings pitched, creating concerns about his control. At the end of the 1916 season, Sporting Life reported on Love's lack of control:

Bill Donovan has hopes that Slim Love will win a regular place on the New Yorks' pitching staff next season. Love simply lacks confidence in his own great ability. In batting practice when he puts his stuff on the ball, Love usually has the New York hitters helpless. At such times his control is exceptional. When sent into a game wildness, as a rule, forces him to let up on his stuff, and his batting practice speed and curves are missing.

During spring training in Macon, Georgia, before the 1917 season, Yankees manager Bill Donovan opined that control was the only aspect missing from Love's game:

If that big fellow ever acquires control he will be as difficult to hit as Rube Waddell was in his best days. No left-hander since Rube's time had such a good fast ball. His curve breaks fast and his great height will add to his effectiveness.

Early in the 1917 season, Love saw little playing time. Then, in late May and early June, Love pitched 28 consecutive scoreless innings, allowing only nine hits and five bases on balls, while striking out 11 batters. Love finished the 1917 season with a 6-5 record and 2.35 ERA in 33 games and 133-1/3 innings pitched.

Love spent three seasons with the Yankees, compiling a record of 21–17. His best year was 1918 when he had a 13–12 record (including 13 complete games) and was among the American League leaders in multiple pitching categories. During the 1918 season, Love struck out an average of 3.74 batters for every nine innings pitched, the fifth highest average in the American League. His total of 95 strikeouts was seventh best in the league. However, control continued to be a problem, as he led the American League in bases on balls allowed with 116 and was third in hit batsmen with ten. He was also fifth in earned runs allowed with 78.

=== Detroit Tigers ===
On December 18, 1918, the Yankees traded Love, Frank Gilhooley, Roxy Walters, and Ray Caldwell to the Boston Red Sox for Dutch Leonard, Ernie Shore, and Duffy Lewis. Love never played a game for the Red Sox, as he was traded with Chick Shorten and Eddie Ainsmith to the Detroit Tigers in January 1919 for Ossie Vitt. He returned his signed contract to the Tigers in February 1919.

In March 1919, Love sustained a fracture in his elbow, causing him to miss the early portion of the season. Love returned from the injury and compiled a 6–4 record in 22 games with a 3.01 ERA. On August 24, 1919, Slim allowed Babe Ruth's 42nd career home run in Detroit, in the sixth inning.

Love began the 1920 season with the Tigers. However, he appeared in only one game, his final game in the major leagues being played on April 18. In four-and-one-third innings, Love gave up six hits, four bases on balls, and four earned runs and was charged with two wild pitches.

=== San Francisco Seals ===
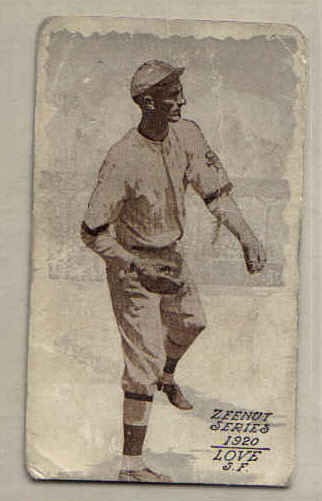
Slim Love, San Francisco Seals, Zeenuts Baseball Card (1920)

In May 1920, Love was traded by Detroit to the San Francisco Seals of the Pacific Coast League "in exchange for the pick of the Seals." After a month in San Francisco, The Sporting News reported that the Seals were dissatisfied with the transaction: "[U]nless he does more than he has shown so far, the Seals have been bunked by Detroit. This big fellow has been here a month, and is not yet in shape. In any other line of business, he would be docked until he could deliver the goods." Love appeared in 44 games for the Seals, compiling a 12–19 record and 2.67 ERA in 290.1 innings pitched.

=== Vernon Tigers ===
Love spent the 1921 season with the Vernon Tigers in the Pacific Coast League. In his first game for Vernon, on April 6, 1921, Love pitched a three-hit shutout against Sacramento. His prospects declined as the season wore on, and he finished the 1921 season with a 5–14 record and 4.55 ERA in 37 games and 182.0 innings pitched. Love remained with Vernon at the start of the 1922 season, appearing in seven games and compiling a 2–2 record and 3.66 ERA.

=== Dallas Marines/Steers ===
During the 1922 season, Love was acquired by the Beaumont Exporters of the Texas League. In August 1922, Love and two other players were sold by Beaumont to the Dallas Marines (later renamed the Dallas Steers) in a transaction that was called "the biggest player deal in the history of the Texas League." Love compiled a 13–11 record and 4.06 ERA in 32 Texas League games during the 1922 season.

Love remained in Dallas until 1928. In 1926, he won 21 games and recorded 216 strikeouts, as he led Dallas to the Texas League pennant with a victory over the New Orleans Pelicans in the Dixie Series. The Sporting Life reported at the time:

Few pitchers in baseball have more speed than Slim Love. There aren't any with a more wicked cross-fire. There isn't a left-handed hitter in the Texas League that wouldn't tell you that he would give his first pay check in on a pool to buy Love and sell him out of the league. And for the reason that New Orleans is being counted upon to offer a string of left-handed batsmen, Love is expected to be particularly effective in the Dixie Series. He is being counted on for two games and probably three if the series goes the limit.

=== 1928 to 1930 seasons ===
On May 31, 1928, the Dallas Steers optioned Love to the San Antonio Bears. After several years as one of the best pitchers in the Texas League, Love had been unable to pitch a complete game in the first two months of the season. He pitched for both San Antonio and Wichita Falls during the 1928 season. In 1930, he played for the Baton Rouge Highlanders in the Cotton States League.

== Family and later years ==
Love was married to Mary (Stepan) Love. At the time of the 1920 United States Census, Love and his wife were living with his wife's parents in Los Angeles. By 1930, Love and his wife, Mary, were living in Memphis, Tennessee, and his occupation was listed as a professional baseball player. In 1935 and 1939, Love and his wife, Mary, were living in Memphis, and he was employed as a pipe fitter with the Love Automatic Sprinkler Company. In 1940, Love remained living in Memphis with his wife, and he was still employed as a pipe fitter for sprinkler systems. In approximately 1940, Love became employed as a steamfitter at the Naval Air Base in Millington, Tennessee.

After retiring from baseball, Love was also active in sandlot baseball in Memphis. He died in Memphis on November 30, 1942, at age 52, after being struck by the driver of an automobile. He was buried at the Forest Hill Cemetery Midtown in Memphis.
