= Patrick H. Joyce =

American railroad executive

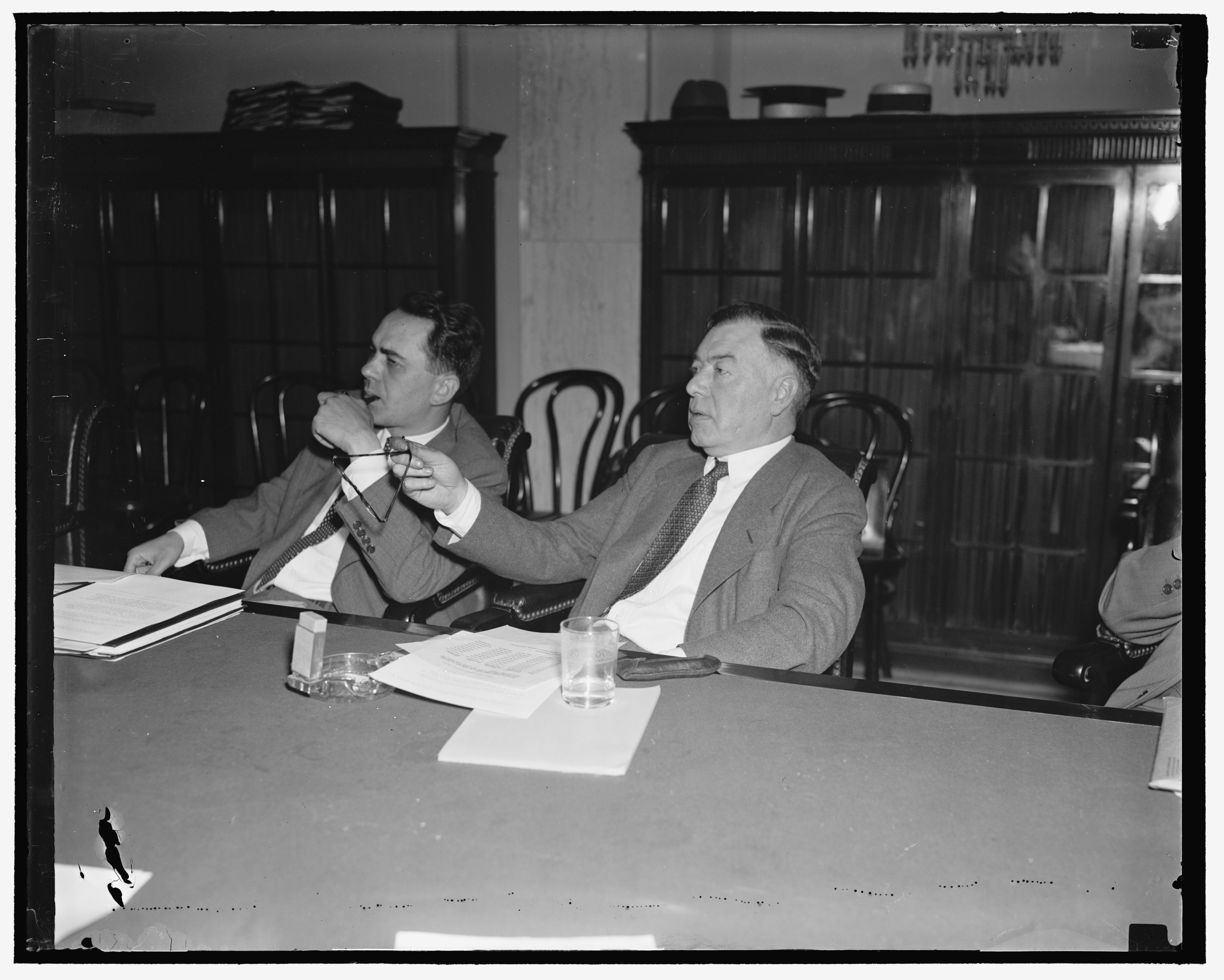
- Born: March 6, 1879; Chicago, Illinois
- Died: November 10, 1946 (aged 67); Chicago, Illinois

Patrick H. Joyce (March 6, 1879 – November 10, 1946) was an American railroad executive. He acted as chairman, president and trustee of the Chicago Great Western Railway between 1931 and 1946.

| Preceded by Victor V. Boatner | President of Chicago Great Western Railway; 1931 – 1946 | Succeeded by Harold W. Burtness |
