= Simon Bolivar Dean =

Simon Bolivar Dean (July 28, 1874-1952) was a merchant, planter, and cotton buyer who served in the Mississippi Senate during the 1928 to 1932 term. He belonged to the Knights of Pythias and Elks. He was married.

He was born in Nesbitt, Mississippi. He died in 1952.
