= Grant Stauffer =

- Born: 1888; Hope, Kansas
- Died: March 31, 1949; New York, New York

Grant Stauffer (1888–1949) was an American coal and railroad executive. He served as the president of the Sinclair Coal Company at one time, and headed the Kansas City, Missouri Chamber of Commerce. He also served as the president of the Chicago Great Western Railway for five months between 1948 and his death from cancer in 1949.

Preceded by Harold W. Burtness	President of Chicago Great Western Railway; 1948 – 1949	Succeeded by William N. Deramus III
