= Potts Camp, Mississippi =

- Town
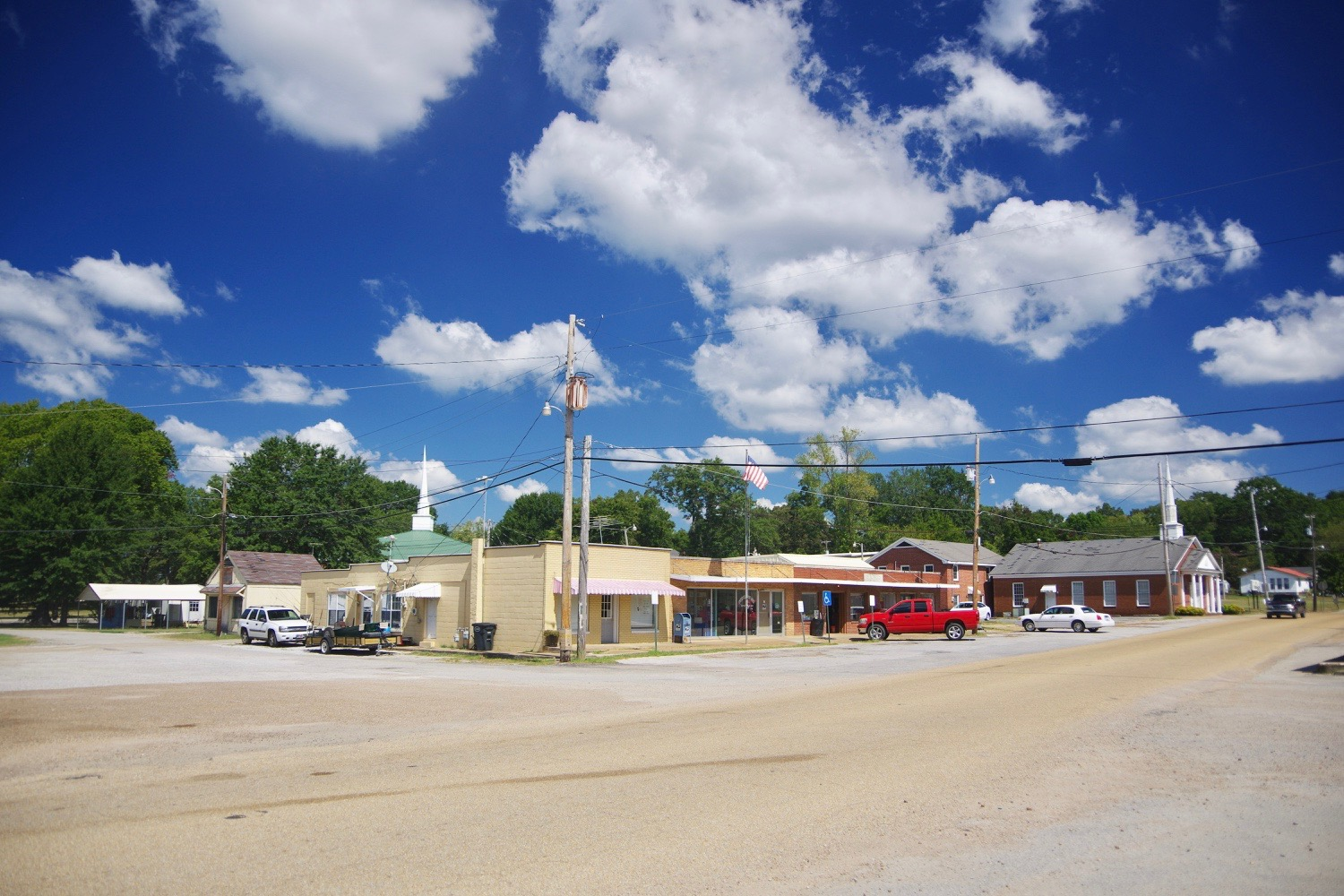
- Potts Camp

- Flag

- Location in Marshall County and the state of Mississippi

- Location in the United States
- Coordinates: 34°38′57″N 89°18′23″W
- Country: United States
- State: Mississippi
- County: Marshall

Area
  - Total: 0.97 sq mi (2.52 km^{2})
  - Land: 0.97 sq mi (2.52 km^{2})
  - Water: 0 sq mi (0.00 km^{2})
- Elevation: 354 ft (108 m)

Population (2020)
  - Total: 416
  - Density: 428.2/sq mi (165.34/km^{2})
- Time zone: UTC-6 (Central (CST))
  - Summer (DST): UTC-5 (CDT)
- ZIP code: 38659
- Area code: 662
- FIPS code: 28-59720
- GNIS feature ID: 2407152

Potts Camp is a town in Marshall County, Mississippi, United States. The population was 416 at the 2020 census, down from 523 in 2010.

== History ==
Potts Camp is rooted in a trading post established along the Pontotoc Trail by Colonel Erasmus Potts in the mid-19th century. The town incorporated in 1912.

== Geography ==
Potts Camp is located in northeastern Marshall County. It is bordered to the east by Benton County. The town is located 30 miles (48 km) northeast of Oxford along Mississippi Highway 178. Interstate 22 passes through the northern part of town, leading northwest 12 miles (19 km) to Holly Springs, the Marshall county seat, and southeast 21 miles (34 km) to New Albany.

According to the U.S. Census Bureau, Potts Camp has a total area of 1.0 square mile (2.6 km^{2}), all land. Oaklimeter Creek, a tributary of the Tippah River, runs along the town's southwestern boundary.

== Demographics ==
Historical population
Census	Pop.	Note	%±
1900	306		—
1910	312		2.0%
1920	319		2.2%
1930	326		2.2%
1940	394		20.9%
1950	432		9.6%
1960	429		−0.7%
1970	459		7.0%
1980	525		14.4%
1990	483		−8.0%
2000	494		2.3%
2010	523		5.9%
2020	416		−20.5%
U.S. Decennial Census

=== 2020 census ===
Potts Camp Racial Composition
Race	Num.	Perc.
White	243	58.41%
Black or African American	149	35.82%
Other/Mixed	20	4.81%
Hispanic or Latino	4	0.96%

As of the 2020 United States census, there were 416 people, 257 households, and 145 families residing in the town.

=== 2000 census ===
As of the census of 2000, there were 494 people, 195 households, and 135 families residing in the town. The population density was 552.5 inhabitants per square mile (213.3/km^{2}). There were 225 housing units at an average density of 251.6 per square mile (97.1/km^{2}). The racial makeup of the town was 66.60% White, 32.59% African American, and 0.81% from two or more races. Hispanic or Latino of any race were 0.61% of the population.

There were 195 households, out of which 36.9% had children under the age of 18 living with them, 43.6% were married couples living together, 20.0% had a female householder with no husband present, and 30.3% were non-families. 26.2% of all households were made up of individuals, and 10.8% had someone living alone who was 65 years of age or older. The average household size was 2.53 and the average family size was 3.01.

In the town, the population was spread out, with 29.4% under the age of 18, 10.5% from 18 to 24, 28.1% from 25 to 44, 20.6% from 45 to 64, and 11.3% who were 65 years of age or older. The median age was 31 years. For every 100 females, there were 85.0 males. For every 100 females age 18 and over, there were 81.8 males.

The median income for a household in the town was $23,472, and the median income for a family was $30,903. Males had a median income of $28,333 versus $21,875 for females. The per capita income for the town was $11,600. About 20.1% of families and 23.0% of the population were below the poverty line, including 27.0% of those under age 18 and 18.8% of those age 65 or over.

== Education ==
Potts Camp is served by the Marshall County School District.

== Notable people ==
- Bob Boyd, former Major League Baseball player
- Kenny Brown, blues guitarist
- Aaron L. Ford, member of the U.S. House of Representatives from 1935 to 1943
