= Tyro, Mississippi =

- Unincorporated community
- Location within Mississippi Location within the United States
- Coordinates: 34°35′01″N 89°42′19″W
- Country: United States
- State: Mississippi
- County: Tate
- Elevation: 459 ft (140 m)
- Time zone: UTC-6 (Central (CST))
  - Summer (DST): UTC-5 (CDT)
- ZIP code: 38668
- Area code: 662
- GNIS feature ID: 679019

Tyro is an unincorporated community in Tate County, Mississippi, United States. Tyro is approximately 8 miles (13 km) east of Looxahoma and approximately 12 miles (19 km) south-southeast of Independence.

Tyro is the birthplace of singer Al Hibbler, who produced multiple best selling songs.

Tyro's name originated from the English word tyro, which also means "beginner" or "novice".
