= Memphis, Mississippi =

- Village
- Location of Memphis, Mississippi
- Coordinates: 34°55′33″N 90°8′28″W
- Country: United States
- State: Mississippi
- County: DeSoto

Area
  - Total: 4.4 sq mi (11.3 km^{2})
  - Land: 4.3 sq mi (11.2 km^{2})
  - Water: 0.039 sq mi (0.1 km^{2})
- Elevation: 220 ft (67 m)

Population (2000)
  - Total: 87
  - Density: 20/sq mi (7.8/km^{2})
- Time zone: UTC-6 (Central (CST))
  - Summer (DST): UTC-5 (CDT)
- Zip code: 38680
- FIPS code: 28-46580
- GNIS feature ID: 1675450

Memphis was a village in DeSoto County, Mississippi, United States. The population was 87 at the 2000 census. In 2004, the village of Memphis officially became part of the town of Walls.

== Geography ==
According to the United States Census Bureau, the village has a total area of 4.4 square miles (11 km^{2}), of which 4.3 square miles (11 km^{2}) is land and 0.1 square miles (0.26 km^{2}) (1.14%) is water.

== Demographics ==
=== Racial and ethnic composition ===
Memphis village, Mississippi – Racial and ethnic composition Note: the US Census treats Hispanic/Latino as an ethnic category. This table excludes Latinos from the racial categories and assigns them to a separate category. Hispanics/Latinos may be of any race.
Race / Ethnicity (NH = Non-Hispanic)	Pop 2000	2000
White alone (NH)	80	91.95%
Black or African American alone (NH)	6	6.90%
Native American or Alaska Native alone (NH)	0	0.00%
Asian alone (NH)	0	0.00%
Native Hawaiian or Pacific Islander alone (NH)	1	1.15%
Other race alone (NH)	0	0.00%
Mixed race or Multiracial (NH)	0	0.00%
Hispanic or Latino (any race)	0	0.00%
Total	87	100.00%

=== 2010 census ===
As of the census of 2000, there were 87 people, 27 households, and 25 families residing in the village. The population density was 20.2 people per square mile (7.8 people/km^{2}). There were 27 housing units at an average density of 6.3 per square mile (2.4/km^{2}). The racial makeup of the village was 91.95% White, 6.90% African American and 1.15% Pacific Islander.

There were 27 households, out of which 51.9% had children under the age of 18 living with them, 85.2% were married couples living together, 3.7% had a female householder with no husband present, and 7.4% were non-families. 3.7% of all households were made up of individuals, and none had someone living alone who was 65 years of age or older. The average household size was 3.22 and the average family size was 3.28.

In the village the population was spread out, with 28.7% under the age of 18, 9.2% from 18 to 24, 32.2% from 25 to 44, 19.5% from 45 to 64, and 10.3% who were 65 years of age or older. The median age was 32 years. For every 100 females, there were 85.1 males. For every 100 females age 18 and over, there were 87.9 males.

The median income for a household in the village was $74,375, and the median income for a family was $76,109. Males had a median income of $49,583 versus $12,083 for females. The per capita income for the village was $49,289. None of the population was below the poverty line.

== Education ==
The Village of Memphis is served by the DeSoto County School District.
