= Walls, Mississippi =

- Town
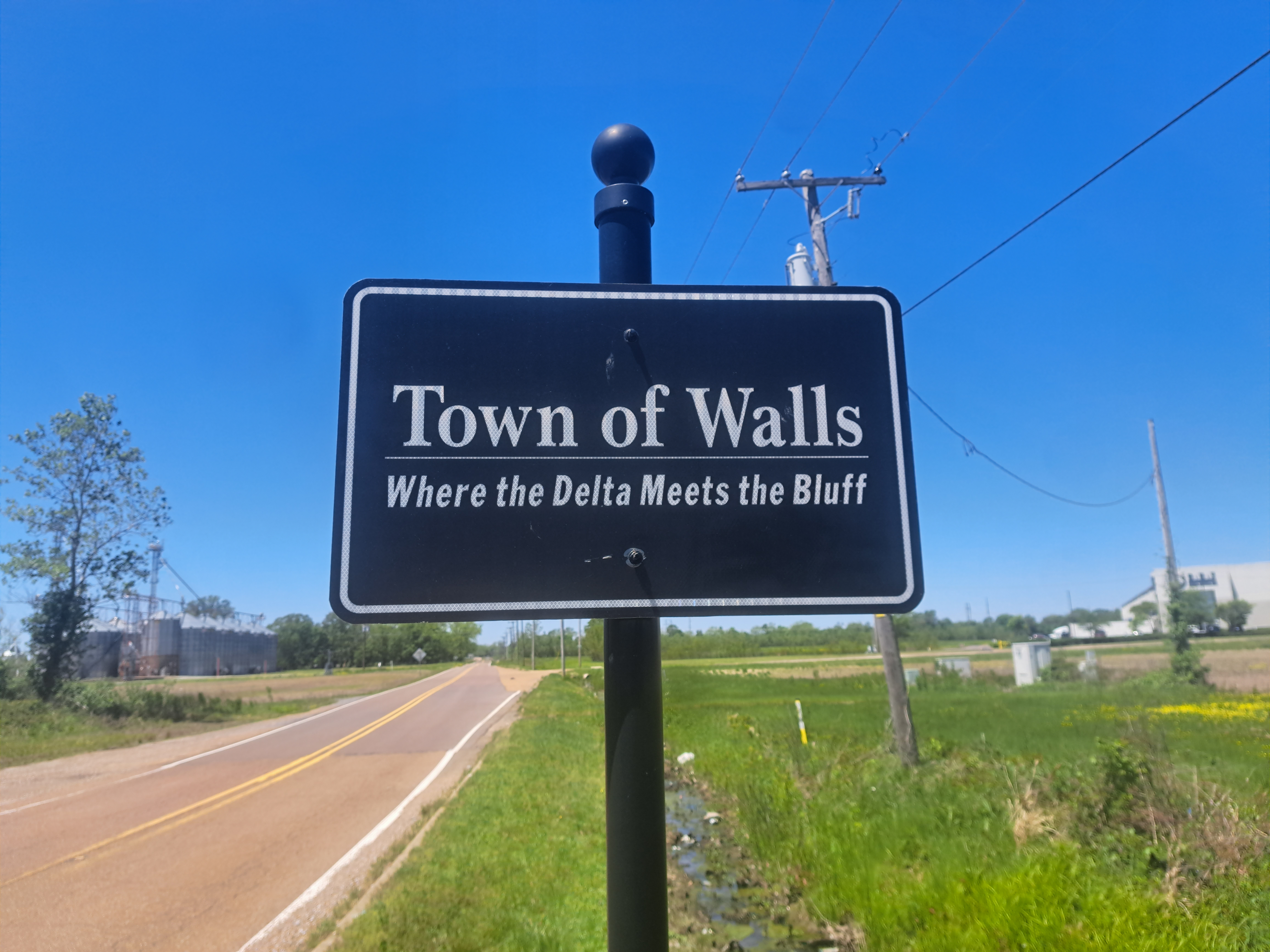
- Town of Walls sign just off Highway 61
- Nickname: "Where the Delta Meets the Bluff"
- Location within Mississippi Location within the United States
- Coordinates: 34°55′23″N 90°08′37″W
- Country: United States
- State: Mississippi
- County: DeSoto
- Town: 2003

Government
  - Mayor: Kiedron Henderson

Area
  - Total: 11.96 sq mi (30.98 km^{2})
  - Land: 11.84 sq mi (30.66 km^{2})
  - Water: 0.13 sq mi (0.33 km^{2})
- Elevation: 197 ft (60 m)

Population (2020)
  - Total: 1,351
  - Density: 114.1/sq mi (44.07/km^{2})
- Time zone: UTC-6 (CST)
  - Summer (DST): UTC-5 (CDT)
- FIPS code: 28-77400
- GNIS feature ID: 1675450
- Website: www.townofwalls.com

Walls is a town located in northern DeSoto County, Mississippi, United States, near the Mississippi River, part of the larger region known as "The Delta", and known for its rich, dark soil. As it is in the upper northwest corner of Mississippi, it is in the Memphis, Tennessee metropolitan area. Its ZIP code is 38680. As of the 2020 census, Walls had a population of 1,351.

== History ==
A relatively young community, Walls was originally named "Alpika," a Chickasaw word. The name was changed to Walls in 1906.

Walls was named after Captain June Walls, who served in the Civil War. Captain Walls was an early settler and merchant of the region in the 1880s.

A Mississippian culture village site near Walls, the Walls Site, gives its name to the Walls phase, the last prehistoric cultural expression before European contact. The historic trail of Hernando de Soto leads through DeSoto County to near Walls.

Today, Walls is a community rich in agriculture. Cotton, soybeans, rice and corn are planted each spring. The railroad played a vital part in the growth of the area in the early to mid 1900s. The digital revolution of the 1950s and 1960s changed Walls, as well as many other Delta communities.

A significant part of the community is the Sacred Heart League, operator of the Sacred Heart School in Walls. The league raised funds through the sale of a famous statue of Jesus Christ. In the 1960s, the statue could be found on the dashboards of vehicles across America.

The unincorporated town of Walls, which has been a community since the early 1900s, was connected to the tiny village of Memphis (pop 87 in 2000) which was incorporated in the early 1970s and was located just south of the Walls community. In 2003/2004, the village of Memphis was annexed, thereby giving the town of Walls the official status of a municipality.

== Geography ==
Average temperatures: January = 39.4 °F (4.1 °C) July = 81.1 °F (27.3 °C)

=== Subdivisions (in the city limits) ===
- Kaitlin Ridge
- Mallard Park
- Encore

=== Neighboring cities ===
- Memphis, Tennessee (north)
- Horn Lake (east)
- Tunica Resorts (southwest)

== Demographics ==
Historical population
Census	Pop.	Note	%±
2010	1,162		—
2020	1,351		16.3%
U.S. Decennial Census

=== Racial and ethnic composition ===
Walls city, Mississippi – Racial and ethnic composition Note: the US Census treats Hispanic/Latino as an ethnic category. This table excludes Latinos from the racial categories and assigns them to a separate category. Hispanics/Latinos may be of any race.
Race / Ethnicity (NH = Non-Hispanic)	Pop 2010	Pop 2020	% 2010	% 2020
White alone (NH)	387	416	33.30%	30.79%
Black or African American alone (NH)	707	813	60.84%	60.18%
Native American or Alaska Native alone (NH)	2	0	0.17%	0.00%
Asian alone (NH)	7	19	0.60%	1.41%
Native Hawaiian or Pacific Islander alone (NH)	0	2	0.00%	0.15%
Other race alone (NH)	4	8	0.34%	0.59%
Mixed race or Multiracial (NH)	20	45	1.72%	3.33%
Hispanic or Latino (any race)	35	48	3.01%	3.55%
Total	1,162	1,351	100.00%	100.00%

=== 2020 census ===
As of the 2020 United States Census, there were 1,351 people, 445 households, and 325 families residing in the town.

== Transportation ==
Amtrak’s City of New Orleans, which operates between New Orleans and Chicago, passes through the town on CN tracks, but makes no stop. The nearest station is located in Memphis, 15 miles (24 km) to the north.

== Education ==
Walls is served by the DeSoto County School District.

=== Secondary schools ===
- Lake Cormorant Middle School
- Lake Cormorant High School

=== Elementary schools ===
- Walls Elementary
- Lake Cormorant Elementary

== Growth and expansion ==
=== Leatherman Development ===
The Leatherman family has begun to develop industrial, commercial and residential projects within the town limits of Walls. The first industrial tenant, Sigma Supply Co., has moved into a new 254,000-square-foot (23,600 m^{2}) building off U.S. Highway 61 and Star Landing Road in the Leatherman 325-acre (1.32 km^{2}) industrial park. Sigma Supply is a distributor of industrial and packaging equipment and facilities supplies. The 1,900-acre (7.7 km^{2}) Leatherman Planned Unit Development in Walls touts a new elementary school with 900 students, which opened in August 2008, joining Lake Cormorant Middle School that currently has 700 students. Lake Cormorant High School opened in 2011.

== Notable people ==
- Gene Alday, member of the Mississippi House of Representatives from 2012 to 2016
- Dwayne "The Rock" Johnson, actor and WWE wrestler, briefly stayed in a trailer park in Walls when he was 15 years old.
- J. B. Martin, president of the Negro American League, owner of Chicago American Giants, and Republican politician
- Martaveous McKnight, professional basketball player
- Leslie B. McLemore, civil rights activist and political scientist
- Memphis Minnie, musician
- Harvey Wippleman, former WWF professional wrestler
