= Cockrum, Mississippi =

- Unincorporated community
- Location within Mississippi Location within the United States
- Coordinates: 34°48′10″N 89°48′43″W
- Country: United States
- State: Mississippi
- County: DeSoto
- Elevation: 125 ft (38 m)
- Time zone: UTC-6 (Central (CST))
  - Summer (DST): UTC-5 (CDT)
- ZIP code: 38632
- Area code: 662
- GNIS feature ID: 690250

Cockrum is an unincorporated community located in DeSoto County, Mississippi, United States. Cockrum is approximately 7 miles (11 km) north of Independence and 12 miles (19 km) south of Olive Branch along Mississippi Highway 305.

== History ==
The lands were originally a Chickasaw First Nations settlement. Felix LaBauve (1809–1879), a French émigré and early settler to Mississippi, established a trading post, and the lands were ceded to the state and opened up in 1832.

Cockrum was the name of a pioneer settler, and was first named Cockrum Cross Roads. The area grew to have two public hotels and over twenty stores, including a masonic lodge. The community also became the market place and headquarters for slave owners. During the American Civil War (1861–1865), a noted skirmish took place led by General Nathan Bedford Forrest; Forrest was raised in nearby Hernando.

Following the Civil War, Cockrum's slave trading post status changed, poverty set in, and the Ku Klux Klan presence established.

Whilst many churches in Mississippi were of the United Methodist Church religious denomination, mid-2023 saw Cockrum parishioners move to the new Global Methodist Church presence.

== Facilities ==
A former 1928 brick building, used as the Cockrum Community School until 1959, is now a Mississippi historic landmark. The building may become a community centre.

The area has a fire department, and a community park with a 0.25 miles (0.40 km) trail.

== Notable people ==
- Carl C. Allen (1888–1965), pharmacist, farmer, and politician.

== See also ==
- Hernando, Mississippi
