= Bethlehem, Mississippi =

- Census-designated place
- Location within Mississippi Location within the United States
- Coordinates: 34°34′38″N 89°19′44″W
- Country: United States
- State: Mississippi
- County: Marshall

Area
  - Total: 3.88 sq mi (10.04 km^{2})
  - Land: 3.88 sq mi (10.04 km^{2})
  - Water: 0 sq mi (0.00 km^{2})
- Elevation: 381 ft (116 m)

Population (2020)
  - Total: 319
  - Density: 82.3/sq mi (31.77/km^{2})
- Time zone: UTC-6 (Central (CST))
  - Summer (DST): UTC-5 (CDT)
- ZIP code: 38659 (Potts Camp)
- Area code: 662
- GNIS feature ID: 2812735
- FIPS Code: 28-05780

Bethlehem is a census-designated place (CDP) and unincorporated community in Marshall County, Mississippi, United States.

The 2020 Census listed a population of 319.

== Geography ==
The community is located in southeastern Marshall County along Mississippi Highway 349, in the heart of Holly Springs National Forest. Potts Camp, the mailing address for Bethlehem with ZIP Code 38659, is 5 miles (8 km) to the north, and Holly Springs, the Marshall county seat, is 18 miles (29 km) to the northwest. New Albany in Union County is 24 miles (39 km) by road to the southeast.

According to the U.S. Census Bureau, the Bethlehem CDP has an area 3.9 square miles (10 km^{2}), all land. It is bordered to the north by Potts Creek and to the southeast by a tributary of the Little Tallahatchie River. The community is within the Tallahatchie River watershed.

== Demographics ==
Historical population
Census	Pop.	Note	%±
2020	319		—
U.S. Decennial Census; 2020

Bethlehem was first listed as a census designated place in the 2020 U.S. census.

=== 2020 census ===
Bethlehem CDP, Mississippi – Racial and ethnic composition Note: the US Census treats Hispanic/Latino as an ethnic category. This table excludes Latinos from the racial categories and assigns them to a separate category. Hispanics/Latinos may be of any race.
Race / Ethnicity (NH = Non-Hispanic)	Pop 2020	% 2020
White alone (NH)	254	79.62%
Black or African American alone (NH)	44	13.79%
Native American or Alaska Native alone (NH)	0	0.00%
Asian alone (NH)	0	0.00%
Native Hawaiian or Pacific Islander alone (NH)	1	0.31%
Other race alone (NH)	0	0.00%
Mixed race or Multiracial (NH)	11	3.45%
Hispanic or Latino (any race)	9	2.82%
Total	319	100.00%

== Notable people ==
Railroad executive Victor V. Boatner was born in Bethlehem, as was Naismith Basketball Hall of Fame member and civil rights advocate Chet Walker.
