= Oaklimeter Creek =

Stream in Mississippi

Coordinates: 34.6564878°N 89.3261862°W

Oaklimeter Creek is a stream in the U.S. state of Mississippi.

Oaklimeter is a name derived from the Choctaw language purported to mean "young people" or possibly "young town". Variant names are "Oakljmeter Creek", "Okannatie Creek", and "Oklolimeter Creek".
