= Lake View, Mississippi =

- Census-designated place
- Location within Mississippi Location within the United States
- Coordinates: 34°59′20″N 90°08′28″W
- Country: United States
- State: Mississippi
- County: DeSoto

Area
  - Total: 0.25 sq mi (0.66 km^{2})
  - Land: 0.20 sq mi (0.53 km^{2})
  - Water: 0.050 sq mi (0.13 km^{2})
- Elevation: 228 ft (69 m)

Population (2020)
  - Total: 299
  - Density: 1,473.8/sq mi (569.04/km^{2})
- Time zone: UTC-6 (Central (CST))
  - Summer (DST): UTC-5 (CDT)
- ZIP code: 38680
- Area code: 662
- GNIS feature ID: 691994

Lake View is a census-designated place (CDP) and unincorporated community located in DeSoto County, Mississippi, United States, near the Mississippi/Tennessee border just south of Memphis and north of the village of Walls. Lake View is located on the former Yazoo and Mississippi Valley Railroad.

During Prohibition, multiple Memphis businessmen opened nightclubs in Lake View.

A post office operated under the name Lake View from 1885 to 1895 and under the name Lakeview from 1895 to 1932.

From 1910 to 1928, the Memphis Street Railway Company operated the Memphis and Lakeview Railway. This was a 10 mile track that had four streetcars assigned to it.

The Valley Brick and Tile Company once operated a brick factory in Lake View.

Per the 2020 Census, the population was 299.

== Demographics ==
Historical population
Census	Pop.	Note	%±
2020	299		—
U.S. Decennial Census; 2020

Lake View was first listed as a census designated place in the 2020 U.S. census.

=== 2020 census ===
Lakeview CDP, Mississippi – Racial and ethnic composition Note: the US Census treats Hispanic/Latino as an ethnic category. This table excludes Latinos from the racial categories and assigns them to a separate category. Hispanics/Latinos may be of any race.
Race / Ethnicity (NH = Non-Hispanic)	Pop 2020	% 2020
White alone (NH)	84	28.09%
Black or African American alone (NH)	18	6.02%
Native American or Alaska Native alone (NH)	0	0.00%
Asian alone (NH)	0	0.00%
Native Hawaiian or Pacific Islander alone (NH)	0	0.00%
Other race alone (NH)	1	0.33%
Mixed race or Multiracial (NH)	7	2.34%
Hispanic or Latino (any race)	189	63.21%
Total	299	100.00%

== Transportation ==
Amtrak’s City of New Orleans, which operates between New Orleans and Chicago, passes through the town on CN tracks, but makes no stop. The nearest station is located in Memphis, 10 miles (16 km) to the north.
