= Nesbit, Mississippi =

- Unincorporated community
- Location within Mississippi Location within the United States
- Coordinates: 34°52′54″N 90°00′31″W
- Country: United States
- State: Mississippi
- County: DeSoto
- Elevation: 279 ft (85 m)
- Time zone: UTC-6 (Central (CST))
  - Summer (DST): UTC-5 (CDT)
- ZIP code: 38651
- Area code: 662
- GNIS feature ID: 690351

Nesbit is a former unincorporated community in DeSoto County, Mississippi, United States. It is now located within the city limits of Hernando.

== History ==
A post office operated under the name Nesbits Station from 1869 to 1881 and began operating under the name Nesbit in 1881.

In the early 1900s, an academy, two churches, and a sawmill were located in Nesbit.

Nesbit is located on the former Illinois Central Railroad.

== Geography ==
Nesbit is approximately 7 miles (11 km) south of Horn Lake, approximately 9 miles (14 km) south of Southaven and approximately 5 miles (8.0 km) north of Hernando near U.S. Route 51 and Interstate 55.

=== Climate ===
Climate data for Nesbit, MS
Month	Jan	Feb	Mar	Apr	May	Jun	Jul	Aug	Sep	Oct	Nov	Dec	Year
Record high °F (°C)	80 (27)	80 (27)	91 (33)	97 (36)	98 (37)	104 (40)	110 (43)	112 (44)	103 (39)	99 (37)	87 (31)	81 (27)	112 (44)
Mean daily maximum °F (°C)	48 (9)	54 (12)	63 (17)	72 (22)	79 (26)	87 (31)	90 (32)	89 (32)	83 (28)	74 (23)	61 (16)	51 (11)	71 (22)
Mean daily minimum °F (°C)	28 (−2)	32 (0)	41 (5)	50 (10)	59 (15)	67 (19)	70 (21)	68 (20)	61 (16)	50 (10)	39 (4)	32 (0)	50 (10)
Record low °F (°C)	−6 (−21)	−5 (−21)	10 (−12)	27 (−3)	36 (2)	49 (9)	41 (5)	49 (9)	38 (3)	24 (−4)	7 (−14)	−5 (−21)	−6 (−21)
Average precipitation inches (mm)	4.55 (116)	4.29 (109)	5.58 (142)	6.02 (153)	5.51 (140)	4.93 (125)	3.68 (93)	3.15 (80)	3.29 (84)	3.34 (85)	5.11 (130)	5.61 (142)	55.06 (1,399)
Average snowfall inches (cm)	2.00 (5.1)	1.20 (3.0)	0.20 (0.51)	0 (0)	0 (0)	0 (0)	0 (0)	0 (0)	0 (0)	0 (0)	0 (0)	0.10 (0.25)	3.50 (8.9)
Source: http://www.intellicast.com/Local/History.aspx?location=USMS0257

== Notable people ==
- Kenny Brown, blues guitarist (born 1953; grew up in Nesbit)
- Mississippi Joe Callicott, blues singer and guitarist (1899-1969; was born and lived in Nesbit)
- Simon Bolivar Dean, member of the Mississippi Senate
- Olivia Holt, teen actress on TV series Kickin' It (born 1997)
- Jerry Lee Lewis, musician
