= Looxahoma, Mississippi =

- Unincorporated community
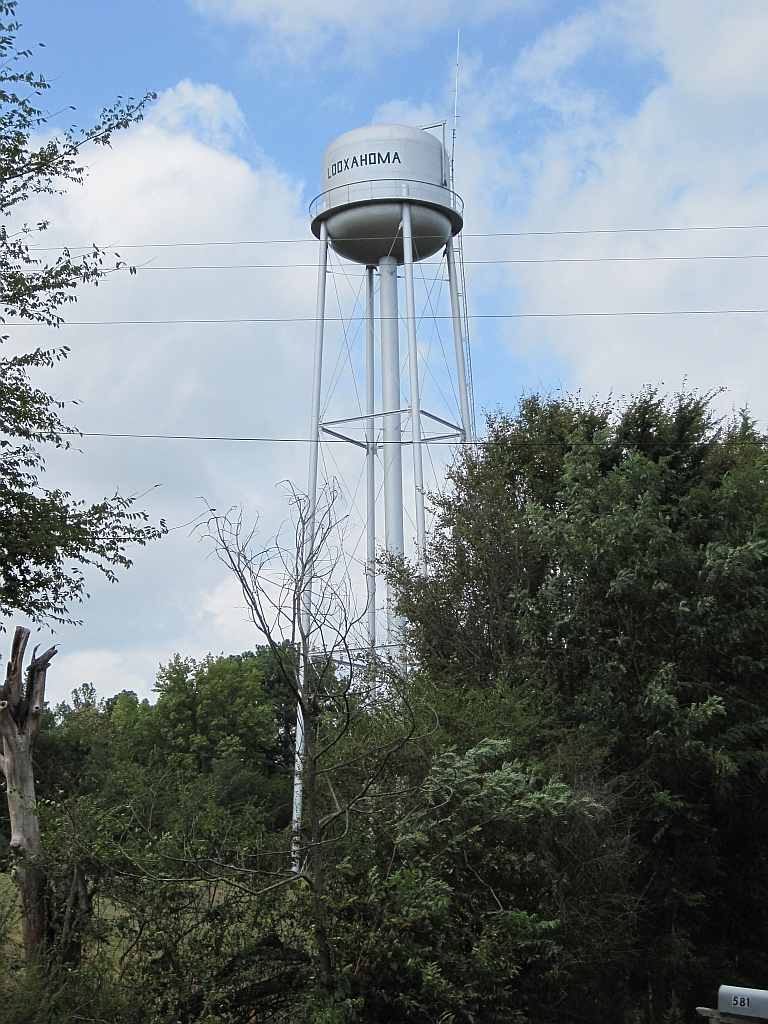
- Looxahoma's water tower

- Location within Mississippi Location within the United States
- Coordinates: 34°35′50″N 89°50′13″W
- Country: United States
- State: Mississippi
- County: Tate
- Elevation: 381 ft (116 m)
- Time zone: UTC-6 (Central (CST))
  - Summer (DST): UTC-5 (CDT)
- ZIP code: 38668
- Area code: 662
- GNIS feature ID: 672865

Looxahoma is an unincorporated community in Tate County, Mississippi, United States. Looxahoma is located approximately 8 miles (13 km) east of Senatobia and approximately 8 miles (13 km) west of Tyro near Mississippi Highway 4.

Looxahoma is a name derived from the Chickasaw language meaning "red turtle".
