= Pleasant Hill, Mississippi =

- Census-designated place
- Location within Mississippi Location within the United States
- Coordinates: 34°55′10″N 89°52′47″W
- Country: United States
- State: Mississippi
- County: Desoto

Area
  - Total: 4.72 sq mi (12.22 km^{2})
  - Land: 4.70 sq mi (12.17 km^{2})
  - Water: 0.019 sq mi (0.05 km^{2})
- Elevation: 354 ft (108 m)

Population (2020)
  - Total: 1,863
  - Density: 396.5/sq mi (153.1/km^{2})
- Time zone: UTC-6 (Central (CST))
  - Summer (DST): UTC-5 (CDT)
- ZIP code: 38651
- Area code: 662
- GNIS feature ID: 2806372

Pleasant Hill is a census-designated place (CDP) and unincorporated community located in DeSoto County, Mississippi, United States, located approximately 9 miles (14 km) southwest of Hernando and 8 miles (13 km) southeast of Eudora, just east of Arkabutla Lake.

Pleasant Hill was formerly incorporated, and was home to several stores, two churches, and a Masonic lodge.

A post office operated under the name Pleasant Hill from 1848 to 1917.

Per the 2020 Census, the population was 1,863.

== Demographics ==
Historical population
Census	Pop.	Note	%±
2020	1,863		—
U.S. Decennial Census; 2020

Pleasant Hill was first listed as a census designated place in the 2020 U.S. census.

=== 2020 census ===
As of the 2020 census, Pleasant Hill had a population of 1,863. The median age was 43.1 years. 25.8% of residents were under the age of 18 and 13.7% were 65 years of age or older. For every 100 females there were 107.0 males, and for every 100 females age 18 and over there were 109.7 males age 18 and over.

0.0% of residents lived in urban areas, while 100.0% lived in rural areas.

There were 646 households in Pleasant Hill, of which 41.8% had children under the age of 18 living in them. Of all households, 75.7% were married-couple households, 7.9% were households with a male householder and no spouse or partner present, and 14.1% were households with a female householder and no spouse or partner present. About 12.4% of all households were made up of individuals and 4.8% had someone living alone who was 65 years of age or older.

There were 667 housing units, of which 3.1% were vacant. The homeowner vacancy rate was 1.6% and the rental vacancy rate was 16.1%.

Pleasant Hill CDP, Mississippi – Racial and ethnic composition Note: the US Census treats Hispanic/Latino as an ethnic category. This table excludes Latinos from the racial categories and assigns them to a separate category. Hispanics/Latinos may be of any race.
Race / Ethnicity (NH = Non-Hispanic)	Pop 2020	% 2020
White alone (NH)	1,569	84.22%
Black or African American alone (NH)	101	5.42%
Native American or Alaska Native alone (NH)	1	0.05%
Asian alone (NH)	57	3.06%
Native Hawaiian or Pacific Islander alone (NH)	0	0.00%
Other race alone (NH)	6	0.32%
Mixed race or Multiracial (NH)	74	3.97%
Hispanic or Latino (any race)	55	2.95%
Total	1,863	100.00%
