= DeSoto County, Mississippi =

County in Mississippi, United States

- County
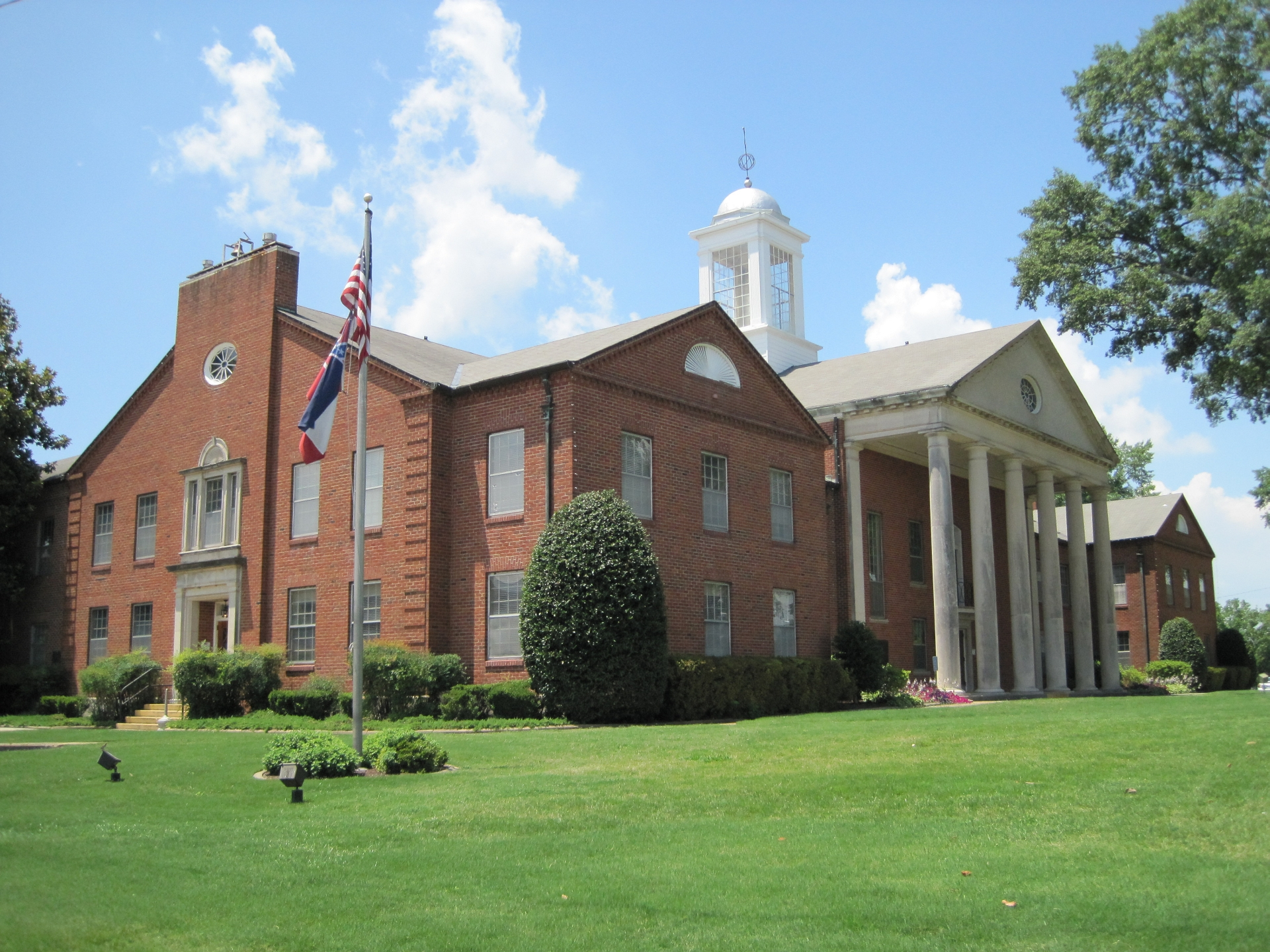
- DeSoto County Courthouse

- Location within the U.S. state of Mississippi
- Coordinates: 34°53′N 89°59′W
- Country: United States
- State: Mississippi
- Founded: February 9, 1836
- Named for: Hernando de Soto
- Seat: Hernando
- Largest city: Southaven

Area
  - Total: 497 sq mi (1,290 km^{2})
  - Land: 476 sq mi (1,230 km^{2})
  - Water: 21 sq mi (54 km^{2}) 4.2%

Population (2020)
  - Total: 185,314
  - Estimate (2025): 197,918 ▲
  - Density: 389/sq mi (150/km^{2})
- Time zone: UTC−6 (Central)
  - Summer (DST): UTC−5 (CDT)
- Congressional district: 1st
- Website: www.desotocountyms.gov

DeSoto County is a county located on the northwestern border of the U.S. state of Mississippi. As of the 2020 census, the population was 185,314, making it the third-most populous county in Mississippi. Its county seat is Hernando. DeSoto County is part of the Memphis metropolitan area. It is the second-most populous county in that statistical area. The county has lowland areas that were developed in the 19th century for cotton plantations, and hill country in the eastern part of the county.

== History ==
DeSoto County, Mississippi, was formally established February 9, 1836. The original county lines included territory now part of Tate County, which was carved out in 1873.

The county is named for Spanish explorer Hernando de Soto, the first European explorer known to reach the Mississippi River. The county seat, Hernando, is also named in his honor. De Soto reportedly died in that area in May 1542, although some accounts suggest that he died near Lake Village, Arkansas.

=== Early history ===
Indian artifacts collected in DeSoto County link it with prehistoric groups of Woodland and Mississippian culture peoples. Members of the Mississippian culture, who built complex settlements and earthwork monuments throughout the Mississippi River Valley and its major tributaries, met Hernando de Soto in the mid-16th century when he explored what is now North Mississippi. By tradition, he is believed to have traveled with his expedition through present-day DeSoto County. Some scholars speculate that de Soto discovered the Mississippi River west of present-day Lake Cormorant, built rafts there, and crossed to present-day Crowley's Ridge, Arkansas. Based on records of the expedition and archeology, the National Park Service has designated a "DeSoto Corridor" from Coahoma County, Mississippi to the Chickasaw Bluff in Memphis.

The Mississippian culture declined and disappeared, and in most areas this preceded European contact. Scholars speculate this may have followed changes in the environment. The town named Chicasa, which De Soto visited, was probably the ancestral home of the historical Chickasaw, who are descended from the Mississippian culture. They had lived in the area for centuries before white settlers began arriving. Present-day Pontotoc, Mississippi developed near the Chickasaw "Long Town", which was composed of several villages near each other. The Chickasaw Nation regarded much of western present-day Tennessee and northern Mississippi as their traditional hunting grounds.

The Chickasaw traded furs for French goods, and the French established several small settlements among them. However, France ceded its claim to territories east of the Mississippi River to Britain in 1763, after having been defeated in the Seven Years' War. The United States acquired the area from the British as part of the treaty that ended the American Revolution.

=== 19th and 20th centuries ===
The Chickasaw finally ceded most of their land to the United States under pressure during Indian Removal, and a treaty in 1832. They were forced to remove to Indian Territory west of the Mississippi River.

Negotiations began in September 1816 between the United States government and the Chickasaw nation and concluded with the signing of the Treaty of Pontotoc in October 1832. During those 16 years, federal officials pressed the Chickasaw for cessions of land to extinguish their land claims to enable white settlement in their territory. Congress passed the Indian Removal Act in 1830, authorizing forcible removal if necessary to extinguish Native American claims in the Southeast. From 1832 to 1836, government surveyors mapped the 6,442,000 acres (26,070 km^{2}) of the Chickasaw domain and divided it into townships, ranges and sections. The Mississippi Legislature formed 10 new counties, including DeSoto, Tunica, Marshall, and Tate, from the territory.

By treaty, the land was assigned by sections of 640 acres (2.6 km^{2}) to individual Indian households. The Chickasaw, a numerically small tribe, were assigned 2,422,400 acres (9,803 km^{2}) of land by using that formula. The government declared the remainder as surplus and disposed of the remaining 400,000 acres (1,600 km^{2}) at public sale. The Indians received at least $1.25 per acre for their land. The government land sold for 75 cents per acre or less.

During and after the Civil War, the area was developed as large plantations by planters for cultivation of cotton, a leading commodity crop. Before the Civil War, they had depended on the labor of thousands of enslaved African Americans. After the war and emancipation, many freedmen stayed in the area, but shaped their own lives by working on small plots as sharecroppers or tenant farmers, rather than on large labor gangs on the plantations. Reliance on agriculture meant that the area did not develop much economically well into the 20th century, and both whites and blacks suffered economically.

In 1890, the state legislature disenfranchised most blacks under the new constitution, which used poll taxes and literacy tests to raise barriers to voter registration. In the early 20th century, many people left the rural county for cities to gain other opportunities. Most blacks could not vote in Mississippi until the late 1960s, after the passage of federal legislation.

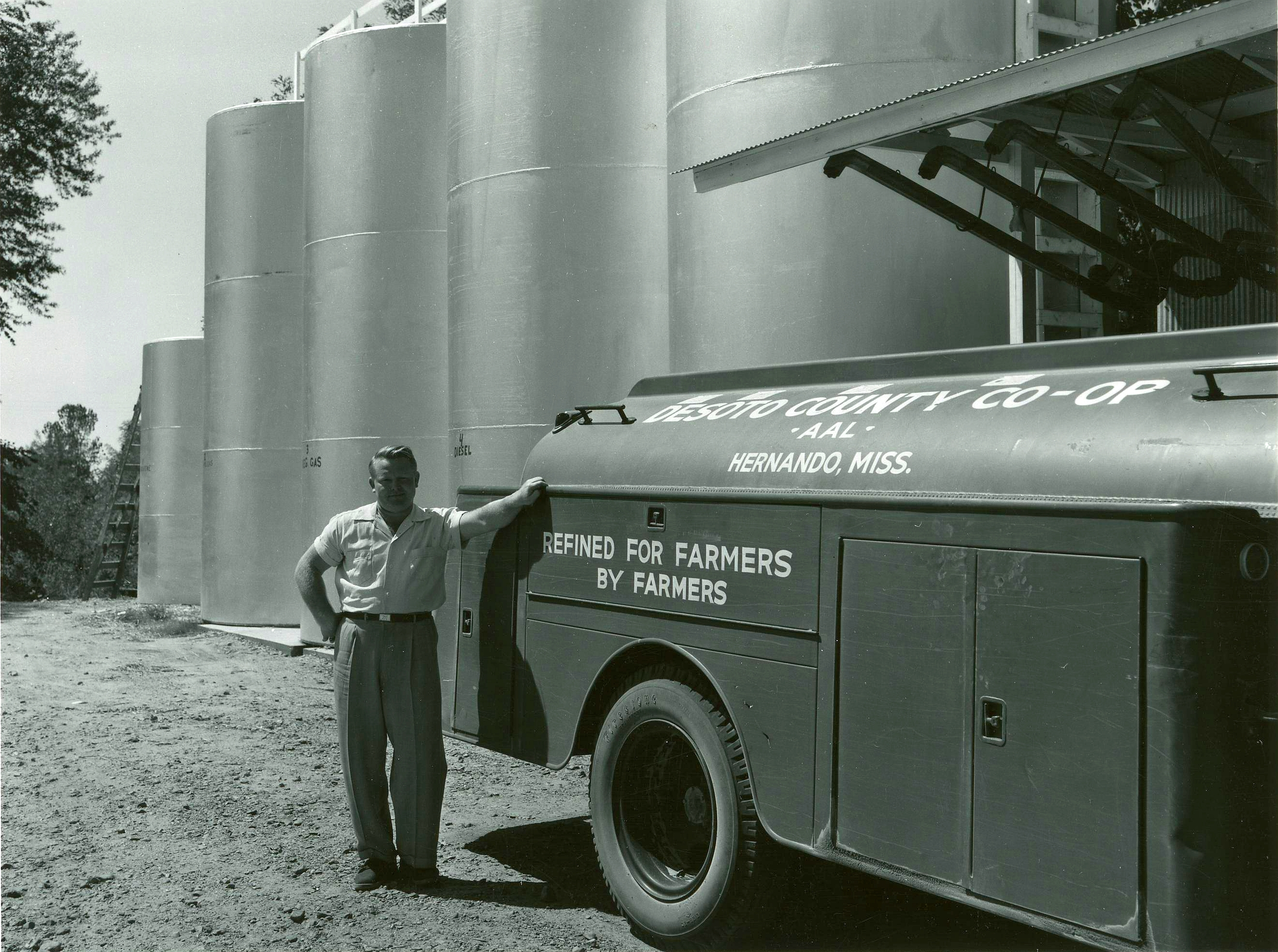
DeSoto County Co-op in Hernando, a sharecroppers' union, 1954

During the Great Depression, the Southern Tenant Farmers Union was organized in 1934. It was open to both black and white sharecroppers and worked to gain better deals and fair accounting from local white landowners. Whites in DeSoto County resisted the effort. In 1935, a white lynch mob attacked early union organizer and minister Reverend T. A. Allen, shot him, and threw him into the Coldwater River. One account said that his body was weighted by chains and that authorities claimed it to be a suicide.

In its 2015 report on Lynching in America (2015), the Equal Justice Institute documented 12 lynchings in the county from 1877 to 1950. Most lynchings in the South took place around the turn of the 20th century.

Since the late 20th century, DeSoto County has experienced considerable suburban development related to the growth of Memphis.

=== 21st century ===
As part of the Memphis, Tennessee metropolitan area, the early-21st-century DeSoto County has become one of the 40 fastest-growing counties in the United States. That is attributed to suburban development as middle-class and wealthier Blacks leave Memphis to acquire newer housing and commute to Memphis for work. Some observers have characterized the shift as black flight, but it is also typical of the pattern of postwar suburban growth in which people who could afford it moved to newer housing in suburbs.

Such suburban residential development in the county has been most noticeable in the Mississippi cities of Southaven, Olive Branch, and Horn Lake, as well with the county seat of Hernando. Also stimulating development in the formerly rural area is the massive casino/resort complex, in the neighboring Tunica County, which is the sixth-largest gambling district in the United States.

== Politics ==
DeSoto County, as did most Southern counties, voted predominantly for the Democratic candidate through 1960. A shift in this pattern took place beginning in 1964, as with the rest of the Solid South. The only Democratic presidential candidate to win DeSoto County since then has been Jimmy Carter, in his successful 1976 bid. However, 1964 was a protest vote against Lyndon Johnson, the 1968 election was for a Democrat running as an independent, and 1972 was for Nixon's second term where he won most of the country. It wasn't until after 1980 that the state became a solid Republican presidential vote and not until 2012 was the State House and Senate Republican. DeSoto County itself only voted 13% for the Republican in 1968, but has been reliably Republican for President since 1980. It first voted for a Republican Governor in 1995, and has since. However, Scott Colom carried DeSoto County in 2026, the first time it went for a Democrat in a statewide race since in 1991.

United States presidential election results for DeSoto County, Mississippi
Year	Republican		Democratic		Third party(ies)	
Year	No.	%	No.	%	No.	%
1912	10	1.73%	546	94.63%	21	3.64%
1916	12	1.37%	861	98.51%	1	0.11%
1920	27	3.20%	816	96.57%	2	0.24%
1924	17	1.57%	1,065	98.43%	0	0.00%
1928	64	4.50%	1,357	95.50%	0	0.00%
1932	13	0.92%	1,396	98.80%	4	0.28%
1936	13	0.96%	1,343	99.04%	0	0.00%
1940	40	2.61%	1,491	97.13%	4	0.26%
1944	123	7.30%	1,561	92.70%	0	0.00%
1948	14	0.97%	137	9.45%	1,299	89.59%
1952	754	36.92%	1,288	63.08%	0	0.00%
1956	398	21.56%	1,236	66.96%	212	11.48%
1960	553	26.56%	795	38.18%	734	35.25%
1964	2,928	86.40%	461	13.60%	0	0.00%
1968	1,092	13.10%	1,898	22.77%	5,346	64.13%
1972	7,917	80.88%	1,557	15.91%	315	3.22%
1976	6,240	43.60%	7,756	54.19%	316	2.21%
1980	9,655	58.80%	6,344	38.64%	420	2.56%
1984	12,576	73.88%	4,369	25.67%	77	0.45%
1988	14,681	72.50%	5,449	26.91%	120	0.59%
1992	16,104	58.40%	8,833	32.03%	2,638	9.57%
1996	18,135	53.53%	10,282	30.35%	5,464	16.13%
2000	24,879	71.21%	9,586	27.44%	471	1.35%
2004	36,306	72.32%	13,583	27.06%	311	0.62%
2008	44,222	68.75%	19,627	30.51%	474	0.74%
2012	43,559	66.21%	21,575	32.79%	660	1.00%
2016	43,089	65.59%	20,591	31.34%	2,015	3.07%
2020	46,462	61.03%	28,265	37.13%	1,397	1.84%
2024	48,064	60.78%	29,023	36.70%	1,995	2.52%

== Geography ==
According to the U.S. Census Bureau, the county has a total area of 497 square miles (1,290 km^{2}), of which 476 square miles (1,230 km^{2}) is land and 21 square miles (54 km^{2}) (4.2%) is water.

=== Geographic features ===
- Mississippi River
- Coldwater River
- Arkabutla Lake
- Chickasaw Bluffs

=== Transit ===
While there is no fixed-route transit within the county, Memphis Area Transit Authority, Amtrak, Greyhound Lines, Megabus and Delta Bus Lines serve nearby Memphis.

=== Major highways ===
- Interstate 55
- Interstate 69
- Interstate 269
- U.S. Route 51
- U.S. Route 61

=== Adjacent counties ===
- Shelby County, Tennessee - north
- Crittenden County, Arkansas - west
- Tunica County - southwest
- Tate County - south
- Marshall County - east

== Demographics ==
Historical population
Census	Pop.	Note	%±
1840	7,002		—
1850	19,042		172.0%
1860	23,336		22.6%
1870	32,021		37.2%
1880	22,924		−28.4%
1890	24,183		5.5%
1900	24,751		2.3%
1910	23,130		−6.5%
1920	24,359		5.3%
1930	25,438		4.4%
1940	26,663		4.8%
1950	24,599		−7.7%
1960	23,891		−2.9%
1970	35,885		50.2%
1980	53,930		50.3%
1990	67,910		25.9%
2000	107,199		57.9%
2010	161,252		50.4%
2020	185,314		14.9%
2025 (est.)	197,918	▲	6.8%
U.S. Decennial Census; 1790-1960 1900-1990; 1990-2000 2010-2013

=== Racial and ethnic composition ===
DeSoto County, Mississippi – Racial and ethnic composition Note: the US Census treats Hispanic/Latino as an ethnic category. This table excludes Latinos from the racial categories and assigns them to a separate category. Hispanics/Latinos may be of any race.
Race / Ethnicity (NH = Non-Hispanic)	Pop 1980	Pop 1990	Pop 2000	Pop 2010	Pop 2020	% 1980	% 1990	% 2000	% 2010	% 2020
White alone (NH)	44,001	58,686	90,816	113,553	108,466	81.59%	86.42%	84.72%	70.42%	58.53%
Black or African American alone (NH)	9,448	8,646	12,166	35,124	55,972	17.52%	12.73%	11.35%	21.78%	30.20%
Native American or Alaska Native alone (NH)	26	118	271	343	298	0.05%	0.17%	0.25%	0.21%	0.16%
Asian alone (NH)	54	149	648	2,011	3,023	0.10%	0.22%	0.60%	1.25%	1.63%
Native Hawaiian or Pacific Islander alone (NH)	x	x	35	76	137	x	x	0.03%	0.05%	0.07%
Other race alone (NH)	17	5	57	145	632	0.03%	0.01%	0.05%	0.09%	0.34%
Mixed race or Multiracial (NH)	x	x	690	1,914	6,625	x	x	0.64%	1.19%	3.58%
Hispanic or Latino (any race)	384	306	2,516	8,086	10,161	0.71%	0.45%	2.35%	5.01%	5.48%
Total	53,930	67,910	107,199	161,252	185,314	100.00%	100.00%	100.00%	100.00%	100.00%

=== 2020 census ===
As of the 2020 census, the county had a population of 185,314. The median age was 37.6 years. 25.5% of residents were under the age of 18 and 14.0% of residents were 65 years of age or older. For every 100 females there were 91.9 males, and for every 100 females age 18 and over there were 88.2 males age 18 and over.

The racial makeup of the county was 59.4% White, 30.3% Black or African American, 0.3% American Indian and Alaska Native, 1.6% Asian, 0.1% Native Hawaiian and Pacific Islander, 3.3% from some other race, and 5.0% from two or more races. Hispanic or Latino residents of any race comprised 5.5% of the population.

78.1% of residents lived in urban areas, while 21.9% lived in rural areas.

There were 67,404 households in the county, of which 37.6% had children under the age of 18 living in them. Of all households, 51.2% were married-couple households, 15.1% were households with a male householder and no spouse or partner present, and 28.2% were households with a female householder and no spouse or partner present. About 22.6% of all households were made up of individuals and 9.0% had someone living alone who was 65 years of age or older.

There were 72,079 housing units, of which 6.5% were vacant. Among occupied housing units, 73.7% were owner-occupied and 26.3% were renter-occupied. The homeowner vacancy rate was 0.9% and the rental vacancy rate was 14.6%.

=== 2013 ===
As of the 2013 U.S.census estimates, there were 168,240 people living in the county. 70.3% were non-Hispanic White, 21.5% Black or African American, 1.6% Asian, 2.6% Native American, 0.1% Pacific Islander, 5.0% were Hispanic or Latino (of any race). The median income for a family was $66,377 and the mean income was $75,875. DeSoto County has the highest median income in Mississippi and the second highest mean income after Madison County.

=== 2000 census ===
According to the 2000 census, the largest self-identified ancestry groups in DeSoto County were English 53.1%, Scots-Irish 15.1%, African 11.4%, and Irish 4.5%. Since then the percentage of African-American population in the county has nearly doubled, as the total county population has also grown.

== Attractions ==
DeSoto County is known for its golf courses. Velvet Cream, known as 'The Dip' by locals, is a landmark restaurant in the county. Operating since 1947, it is the oldest continually running restaurant in the county. In 2010, it was awarded 'Best Ice Cream in Mississippi' by USA Today. DeSoto County was also previously known as the home of Maywood Beach, a water park that closed in 2003 after more than 70 years of operation.

=== DeSoto County Museum ===
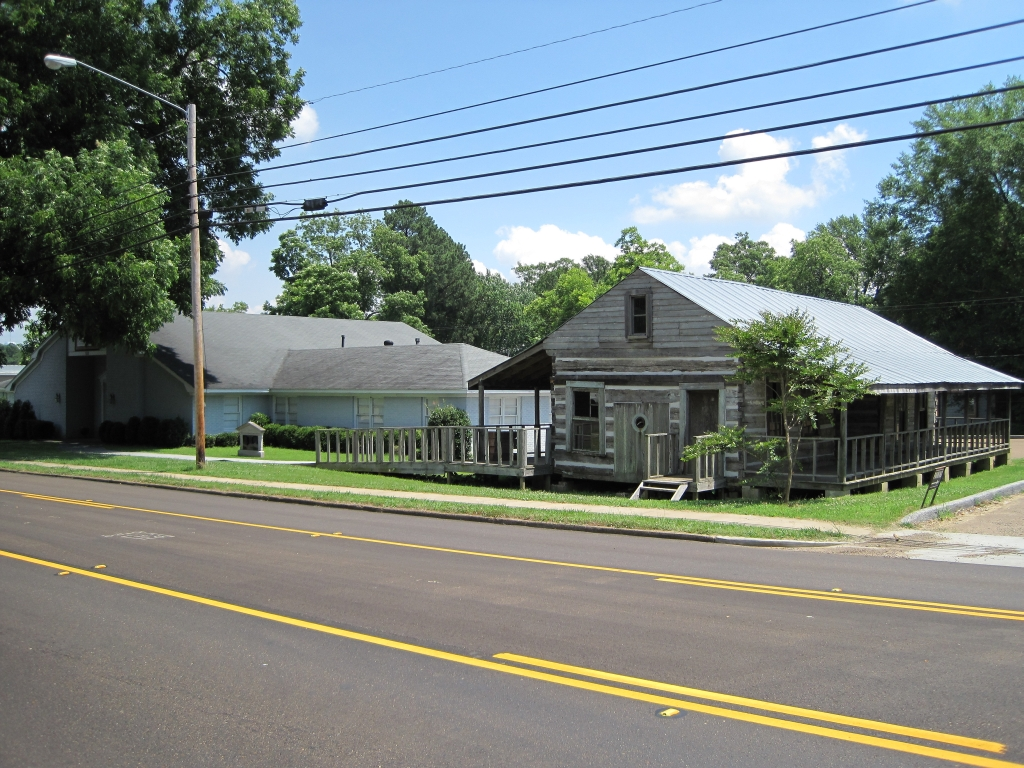
DeSoto County Museum and 18th-century French colonial-style log house

A popular attraction is the DeSoto County Museum located in the county seat of Hernando. The museum is open Tuesday through Saturday from 10–5. Admission is free but donations are encouraged. Exhibits include displays on Hernando DeSoto, Civil War history, French colonial and American antebellum homes of the county, civil rights, and the history of each of the county's municipalities.

An eighteenth-century French colonial log house (see photo to the right) has been preserved from the time of French trading and settlement along the Mississippi. This house is similar in style to several French colonial houses preserved in Ste. Genevieve, Missouri, where many French settled after France ceded its territory east of the Mississippi to Great Britain following its defeat in the Seven Years' War.

=== Hernando DeSoto Park ===
Hernando DeSoto Park, located on Bass Road 6 mi (9.7 km) west of Walls, is a 41 acres (17 ha) park that features a hiking/walking trail, river overlook, picnic area, and boat launch. It is the only location in DeSoto County with public access to the Mississippi River.

== Communities ==
=== Cities ===
- Hernando (county seat)
- Horn Lake
- Olive Branch
- Southaven

=== Town ===
- Walls

=== Census-designated places ===
- Bridgetown
- Eudora
- Lake View
- Lynchburg
- Pleasant Hill

=== Unincorporated communities ===
- Cedarview
- Center Hill
- Cockrum
- Days
- Handy Corner
- Lake Cormorant
- Lewisburg
- Love
- Mineral Wells
- Nesbit
- Norfolk
- West Days

=== Former village ===
- Memphis

== Education ==
Public education in DeSoto County is provided by the DeSoto County School District, the school district for the entire county. It is the state's largest school district. The district is responsible for the operation of eight high schools, eight middle schools, three intermediate (Grades 3–5) and numerous primary schools.

== Notable people ==
- Nakobe Dean, NFL, Philadelphia Eagles.
- John Grisham, lawyer, writer.
- Olivia Holt, actor, singer.
- Jerry Lee Lewis (1935-2022), singer, songwriter, pianist.
- Cody Reed, MLB pitcher, Tampa Bay Rays.
- Austin Riley, MLB third baseman, Atlanta Braves.
- Ricky Stenhouse Jr., NASCAR.
- Heath Riles, Barbecue World Champion
- Malcom Reed, Barbecue Hall of Fame
- Mark Lambert, Barbecue Hall of Fame
- Melissa Cookson, Barbecue Hall of Fame

== Media ==
- DeSoto Times-Tribune
- DeSoto County News

== See also ==
- National Register of Historic Places listings in DeSoto County, Mississippi
- Bill Hawks, agribusinessman and former state senator from DeSoto County
- List of sites and peoples visited by the Hernando de Soto Expedition

== Suggested reading ==
- Map Guide to the U.S. Federal Censuses, 1790–1920, Thorndale, William, and Dollarhide, William; Copyright 1987. (Historic state maps including evolution of DeSoto County)
