= Mississippi Highway 308 =

Former highway in Mississippi

Mississippi Highway 308
- Dubbs Road; Limerick Road
- MS 308 highlighted in pink

Route information
- Maintained by MSHC and Tunica County
- Length: 8.8 mi (14.2 km)
- Existed: 1960–1967

Major junctions
- West end: US 61 near Maud
- East end: MS 4 near White Oak

Location
- Country: United States
- State: Mississippi
- Counties: Tunica

Highway system
- Mississippi State Highway System; Interstate; US; State
← MS 306	→ MS 309

Mississippi Highway 308 (MS 308) was a state highway in northeastern Mississippi, United States. The route started at U.S. Route 61 (US 61) near Maud and traveled eastward through rural Tunica County. It then turned north near the community of Dubbs, and MS 308 ended at MS 4 near White Oak. The gravel road was designated as a state route around 1960, from US 61 to MS 4. It was then decommissioned in 1967.

== Route description ==
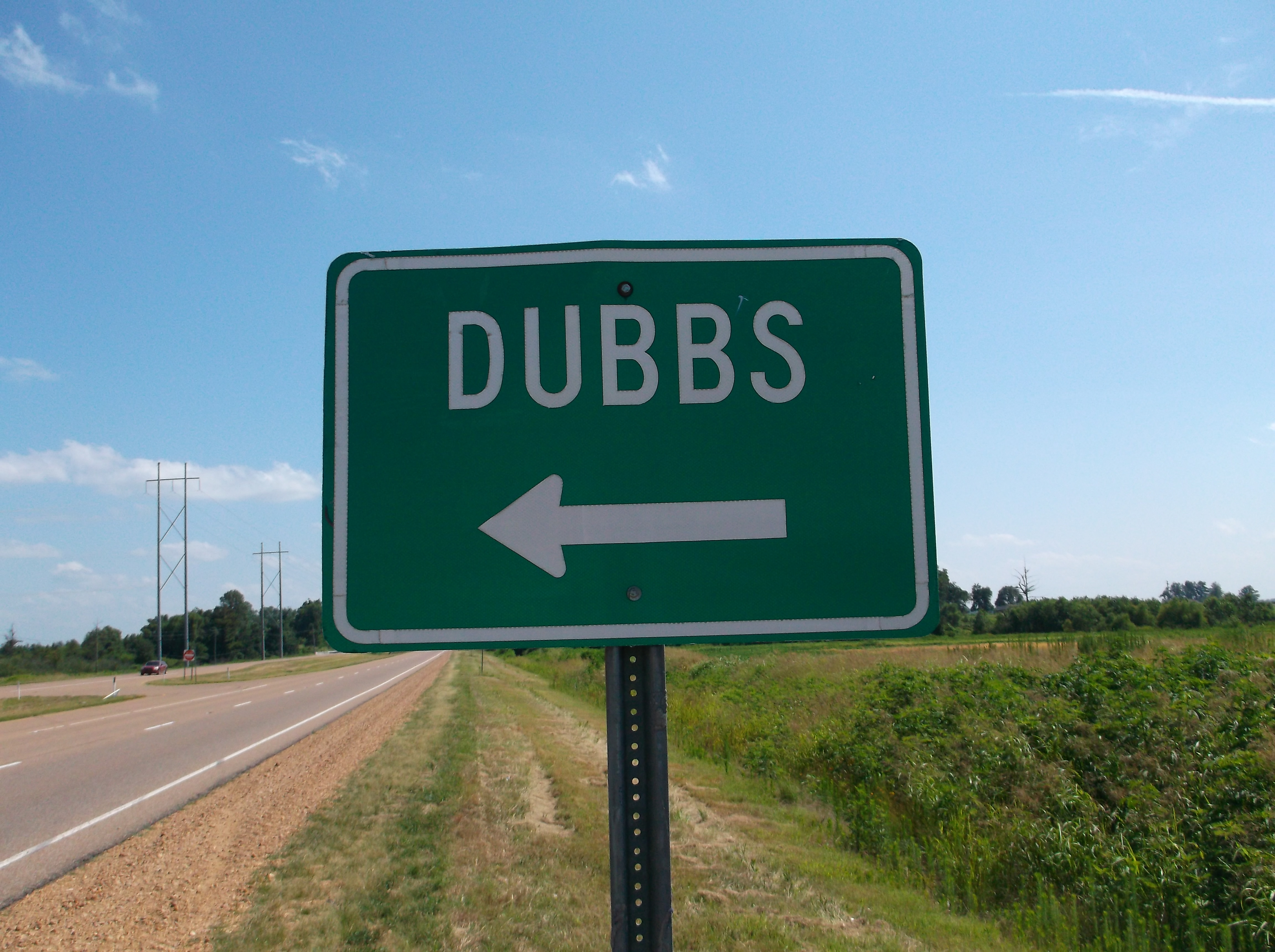
Sign near US 61 and Dubbs Road, former MS 308

The entire route was in Tunica County. MS 308 started at an intersection with US 61 near Maud, and it traveled eastward along Dubbs Road. The route traveled through the unincorporated community of Dubbs near its intersection with Bly Road and Bill Pegram Road. At Limerick Road, MS 308 turned north and continued through farmland. The route ended at an intersection with MS 4 southeast of White Oak. The road was maintained by the Mississippi State Highway Commission (MSHC) and Tunica County, as part of the state highway system.

== History ==
MS 308 was designated around 1960, using an existing gravel road from US 61 to MS 4 within Tunica County. The route was maintained by the MSHC for the section near US 61, and by Tunica County for the section near MS 4. It was removed from the state highway system by 1967. The route is now known as Dubbs Road and Limerick Road, and continue to be maintained by Tunica County.

== Major intersections ==
The entire route was in Tunica County.

Location	mi	km	Destinations	Notes
	0.0	0.0	US 61	Western terminus
	8.8	14.2	MS 4	Eastern terminus
1.000 mi = 1.609 km; 1.000 km = 0.621 mi
