= Harbert Landing, Mississippi =

- Ghost town
- Location within Mississippi
- Coordinates: 34°39′13″N 90°33′26″W
- Country: United States
- State: Mississippi
- County: Tunica
- Elevation: 167 ft (51 m)
- Time zone: UTC-6 (Central (CST))
  - Summer (DST): UTC-5 (CDT)
- GNIS feature ID: 691920

Harbert Landing is a ghost town in Tunica County, Mississippi, United States.

The settlement was located directly on the Mississippi River, along the southeast shore of the U-shaped "OK Bend".

Other settlements along OK Bend included Fox Island and Austin.

== History ==
During the 1800s, Mississippi River steamboats used cord wood for fuel, and a number of woodyards were located along the river, including one in Harbert Landing, owned by Tom Turner. Following the Civil War, ships began using coal for fuel.

In 1942, the United States Army Corps of Engineers constructed the "Hardin Cutoff" across "Hardin Point" peninsula. This cutoff allowed commercial ships to bypass the lengthy OK Bend which flowed around the peninsula. Eventually, the bend became an oxbow lake now called Tunica Lake.
