= National Register of Historic Places listings in Tunica County, Mississippi =

Location of Tunica County in Mississippi

This is a list of the National Register of Historic Places listings in Tunica County, Mississippi.

This is intended to be a complete list of the properties and districts on the National Register of Historic Places in Tunica County, Mississippi, United States. Latitude and longitude coordinates are provided for many National Register properties and districts; these locations may be seen together in a map.

There are eight properties and districts listed on the National Register in the county.

This National Park Service list is complete through NPS recent listings posted October 16, 2026.

== Current listings ==
	Name on the Register	Image	Date listed	Location	City or town	Description
1	Beaverdam Site		August 31, 1978 (#78001631)	Southeastern quarter of the southeastern quarter of Section 19, Township 5 South, Range 11 West; 34°37′43″N 90°23′38″W	Evansville vicinity	
2	Canon Site (22-Tu-523)		January 7, 1987 (#86003635)	Southeastern quarter of the southeastern quarter of Section 17, Township 6 South, Range 10 West; 34°33′27″N 90°16′15″W	Crenshaw vicinity	
3	Dundee Site (22TU501)		January 7, 1987 (#86003655)	Northwestern quarter of the northwestern quarter of Section 34, Township 6 South, Range 12 West; 34°31′24″N 90°27′40″W	Dundee	
4	Evansville Mounds (22TU502)		January 7, 1987 (#86003632)	Northwestern quarter of the northwestern quarter of Section 20, Township 5 South, Range 11 West; 34°38′18″N 90°23′33″W	Evansville	
5	Hollywood Site		May 19, 1972 (#72000701)	Southeastern quarter of the southwestern quarter of Section 33, Township 3 South, Range 11 West; 34°46′39″N 90°22′14″W	Tunica vicinity	
6	Johnson Cemetery Site (22TU516)		January 7, 1987 (#86003633)	Northwestern quarter of the northeastern quarter of Section 16, Township 4 South, Range 11 West; 34°43′51″N 90°21′57″W	Hollywood vicinity	
7	Owens Site (22TU512)		January 7, 1987 (#86003657)	Northwestern quarter of the southeastern quarter of Section 25, Township 5 South, Range 12 West; 34°37′02″N 90°25′01″W	Evansville vicinity	
8	Tunica Historic District	Tunica Historic District	March 17, 2006 (#06000194)	Roughly bounded by Kestevan Alley, Mockingbird St., Cummins Ave., and the Tunica School; 34°41′12″N 90°22′28″W	Tunica	

== See also ==
- List of National Historic Landmarks in Mississippi
- National Register of Historic Places listings in Mississippi
