= Booneville, Mississippi =

- City
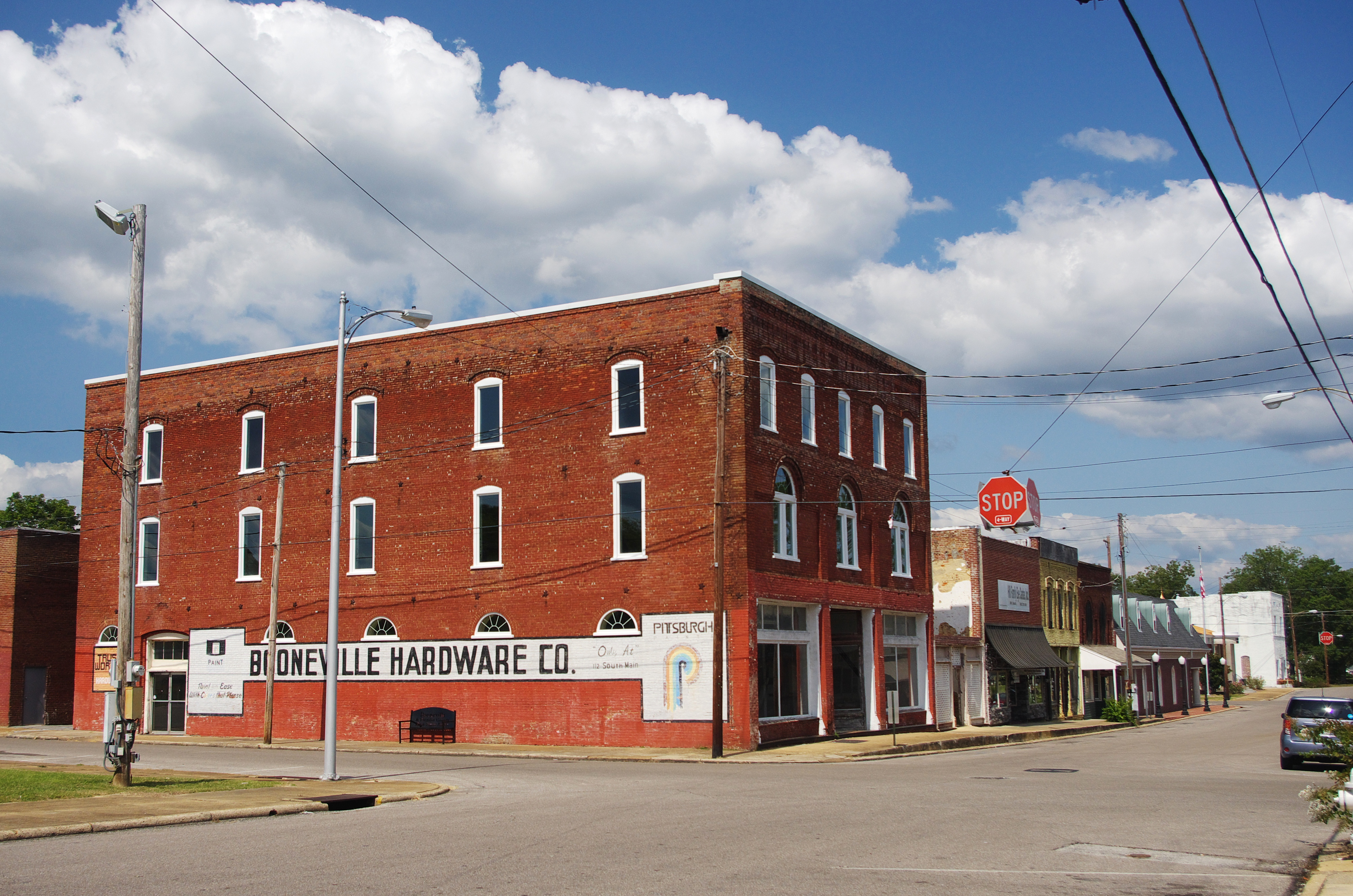
- South Main Street

- Flag
- Nickname: The City of Hospitality
- Location in Prentiss County and Mississippi

- Location within Mississippi Location within the United States Booneville (North America)
- Coordinates: 34°38′40″N 88°34′24″W
- Country: United States
- State: Mississippi
- County: Prentiss
- Settled: 1858
- Incorporated (city): 1861

Government
  - Mayor: Lori Tucker (R)

Area
  - Total: 25.79 sq mi (66.79 km^{2})
  - Land: 25.75 sq mi (66.70 km^{2})
  - Water: 0.035 sq mi (0.09 km^{2})
- Elevation: 489 ft (149 m)

Population (2020)
  - Total: 9,126
  - Density: 354.4/sq mi (136.82/km^{2})
- Demonym: Boonevillian
- Time zone: UTC-6 (CST)
  - Summer (DST): UTC-5 (CDT)
- ZIP code: 38829
- Area code: 662
- FIPS code: 28-07780
- GNIS feature ID: 2403898
- Website: www.visitbooneville.com

Booneville /ˈbuːnvɪl/ is a city in the U.S. state of Mississippi and is the county seat of Prentiss County. It is located in the hilly North Mississippi region, and ecologically is part of the Southeastern Plains region.

The city of Booneville is nicknamed "the City of Hospitality," in reference to the town's southern hospitality. The city flag, welcome sign, and city website have an image of a magnolia blossom, a symbol of hospitality as well as the state flower of Mississippi. Booneville was incorporated in 1861 and named after R.H. Boone, a relative of Daniel Boone. As of the 2020 census, Booneville had a population of 9,126. It is one of 21 certified Mississippi retirement cities.

Booneville is home to Northeast Mississippi Community College, the tenth-largest community college by enrollment in the state.

== History ==
The land of Booneville was bought by B.B. Boone, G.W. Williams, and W.P. Curlee from the Chickasaw tribesman Le-Ho-Yea. The community was named for settler Colonel Reuben Holman Boone, a relative of Daniel Boone, the early American pioneer. The city was initially planned in 1848 as part of the construction on the Mobile and Ohio Railroad. While the settlement grew rapidly in its early years, the American Civil War began just as the city incorporated in 1861 and slowed the city's progress.

=== Civil War ===
The Mobile and Ohio Railroad that ran through Booneville was completed shortly before the Civil War began, around November 1860. It was converted to military use and became a critical military target. 184 miles of the line from Union City, Tennessee to Okolona, Mississippi would be totally destroyed by 1866, causing severe financial strain for the railroad even after it was eventually rebuilt.

On May 30, 1862, Col. Washington Lafayette Elliott of the 2nd Iowa Cavalry Regiment led a Union brigade to Booneville, where they destroyed the local depot and a large train loaded with munitions and captured 2,000 sick and wounded Confederates.

On June 28, 1862, Col. Philip Sheridan of the Union fortified a position in Booneville after hearing that the Confederates intended to move from Tupelo to Corinth in an attempt to recapture the rail junction there. Brig. Gen. James R. Chalmers of the Confederacy led 4,700 troops in an assault that pushed the Union troops to withdraw to a backup position 2 miles (3.2 km) closer to the town. The bulk of the Union force stayed on the defensive while Sheridan sent the 2nd Michigan Cavalry under Capt. Russell Alexander and the 2nd Iowa Cavalry under Lt. Col. Edward Hatch to attack the Confederate rear and left flank. It is estimated 65 of Chalmers' men were killed; Federal casualties were one dead, 24 wounded, and 16 missing.

=== Korean War ===
On December 22, 1950, an explosion and fire at the Booneville Armory killed seven members of Company B, 198th Tank Battalion, a Mississippi Army National Guard unit. Their deaths are considered the first domestic casualties of the Korean War.

== Geography ==
According to the United States Census Bureau, the city has a total area of 25.7 square miles (67 km^{2}), of which 25.7 square miles (67 km^{2}) is land and 0.04 square miles (0.10 km^{2}) (0.16%) is water. The city is concentrated along Mississippi Highway 145 between its intersections with Mississippi Highway 30 to the south and Mississippi Highway 4 to the north. U.S. Route 45 passes through western Booneville, connecting the city with Corinth and Tupelo.

=== Climate ===
Climate is characterized by relatively high temperatures and evenly distributed precipitation throughout the year. The Köppen Climate Classification subtype for this climate is "Cfa" (Humid Subtropical Climate).

Climate data for Booneville, Mississippi (1991–2020 normals, extremes 1892–2021)
Month	Jan	Feb	Mar	Apr	May	Jun	Jul	Aug	Sep	Oct	Nov	Dec	Year
Record high °F (°C)	80 (27)	90 (32)	90 (32)	96 (36)	98 (37)	107 (42)	108 (42)	107 (42)	107 (42)	97 (36)	86 (30)	79 (26)	108 (42)
Mean daily maximum °F (°C)	50.0 (10.0)	54.4 (12.4)	63.4 (17.4)	71.9 (22.2)	79.0 (26.1)	85.7 (29.8)	88.9 (31.6)	88.5 (31.4)	83.7 (28.7)	73.6 (23.1)	61.9 (16.6)	53.0 (11.7)	71.2 (21.8)
Daily mean °F (°C)	39.5 (4.2)	43.2 (6.2)	51.3 (10.7)	59.7 (15.4)	68.0 (20.0)	75.4 (24.1)	78.7 (25.9)	78.0 (25.6)	72.2 (22.3)	61.3 (16.3)	50.0 (10.0)	42.6 (5.9)	60.0 (15.6)
Mean daily minimum °F (°C)	29.0 (−1.7)	32.1 (0.1)	39.2 (4.0)	47.5 (8.6)	57.0 (13.9)	65.1 (18.4)	68.5 (20.3)	67.5 (19.7)	60.7 (15.9)	48.9 (9.4)	38.1 (3.4)	32.2 (0.1)	48.8 (9.3)
Record low °F (°C)	−10 (−23)	−9 (−23)	0 (−18)	25 (−4)	36 (2)	45 (7)	50 (10)	49 (9)	36 (2)	26 (−3)	2 (−17)	−6 (−21)	−10 (−23)
Average precipitation inches (mm)	5.11 (130)	5.26 (134)	5.48 (139)	5.59 (142)	5.61 (142)	5.64 (143)	4.33 (110)	4.49 (114)	4.38 (111)	3.98 (101)	4.28 (109)	6.27 (159)	60.42 (1,535)
Average snowfall inches (cm)	0.3 (0.76)	0.7 (1.8)	0.0 (0.0)	0.0 (0.0)	0.0 (0.0)	0.0 (0.0)	0.0 (0.0)	0.0 (0.0)	0.0 (0.0)	0.0 (0.0)	0.0 (0.0)	0.1 (0.25)	1.1 (2.8)
Average precipitation days (≥ 0.01 in)	11.8	10.4	11.4	10.0	10.3	10.4	9.9	9.3	7.1	7.7	9.5	11.4	119.2
Average snowy days (≥ 0.1 in)	0.4	0.6	0.0	0.0	0.0	0.0	0.0	0.0	0.0	0.0	0.0	0.1	1.1
Source: NOAA

== Demographics ==
Historical population
Census	Pop.	Note	%±
1870	458		—
1880	603		31.7%
1890	748		24.0%
1900	1,050		40.4%
1910	1,337		27.3%
1920	1,495		11.8%
1930	1,703		13.9%
1940	1,893		11.2%
1950	3,295		74.1%
1960	3,480		5.6%
1970	5,895		69.4%
1980	6,199		5.2%
1990	7,955		28.3%
2000	8,625		8.4%
2010	8,743		1.4%
2020	9,126		4.4%
U.S. Decennial Census

=== 2020 census ===
As of the 2020 census, Booneville had a population of 9,126. There were 3,274 households and 1,710 families residing in the city.

The median age was 33.9 years. 21.1% of residents were under the age of 18 and 16.5% of residents were 65 years of age or older. For every 100 females there were 83.8 males, and for every 100 females age 18 and over there were 78.4 males age 18 and over.

70.5% of residents lived in urban areas, while 29.5% lived in rural areas.

Of the city's households, 31.3% had children under the age of 18 living in them. 40.9% were married-couple households, 17.2% were households with a male householder and no spouse or partner present, and 36.1% were households with a female householder and no spouse or partner present. About 32.6% of all households were made up of individuals, and 15.5% had someone living alone who was 65 years of age or older.

There were 3,725 housing units, of which 12.1% were vacant. The homeowner vacancy rate was 3.2% and the rental vacancy rate was 12.6%.

Racial composition as of the 2020 census
Race	Number	Percent
White	6,666	73.0%
Black or African American	1,893	20.7%
American Indian and Alaska Native	25	0.3%
Asian	57	0.6%
Native Hawaiian and Other Pacific Islander	5	0.1%
Some other race	133	1.5%
Two or more races	347	3.8%
Hispanic or Latino (of any race)	267	2.9%

=== 2010 census ===
As of the 2010 census, the population was 8,743.

=== 2000 census ===
As of the census of 2000, there were 8,625 people, 3,302 households, and 2,205 families residing in the city. The population density was 335.8 inhabitants per square mile (129.7/km^{2}). There were 3,625 housing units at an average density of 141.1 per square mile (54.5/km^{2}). The racial makeup of the city was 79.88% White, 18.49% African American, 0.30% Native American, 0.31% Asian, 0.15% from other races, and 0.86% from two or more races. Hispanic or Latino of any race were 0.71% of the population.

There were 3,302 households, out of which 30.4% had children under the age of 18 living with them, 47.8% were married couples living together, 14.7% had a female householder with no husband present, and 33.2% were non-families. 30.7% of all households were made up of individuals, and 16.1% had someone living alone who was 65 years of age or older. The average household size was 2.35 and the average family size was 2.93.

In the city, the population was spread out, with 22.2% under the age of 18, 16.6% from 18 to 24, 23.8% from 25 to 44, 20.1% from 45 to 64, and 17.3% who were 65 years of age or older. The median age was 35 years. For every 100 females, there were 87.6 males. For every 100 females age 18 and over, there were 81.6 males.

The median income for a household in the city was $28,361, and the median income for a family was $38,918. Males had a median income of $29,667 versus $19,821 for females. The per capita income for the city was $15,128. About 11.2% of families and 15.2% of the population were below the poverty line, including 16.2% of those under age 18 and 17.6% of those age 65 or over.

== Education ==
The City of Booneville is served by two public school districts - Booneville and Prentiss County (the former has the inner city and the latter has the outskirts)

Booneville is home to Northeast Mississippi Community College, which has an annual enrollment in excess of 6,000 students. The community college serves five counties: Prentiss, Tippah, Alcorn, Union, and Tishomingo.

== Media ==
=== Newspapers ===
- Banner Independent
- Prentiss County Progress

=== Television stations ===
- WMAE-TV Channel 12 TV
- WHBH-CD Channel 34 TV

=== Radio stations ===
- WBIP AM 1400 Hometown Radio

== Infrastructure ==
=== Transportation ===
Booneville/Baldwyn Airport, located 6 mi (9.7 km) southwest of Booneville, is owned by the cities of Booneville and Baldwyn.

== Notable people ==
- George E. Allen, American political figure and head football coach for 1 game at Cumberland University
- Tracy Arnold, current member of the Mississippi House of Representatives for District 3.
- Harold Bishop, Jr., professional football player
- Cecil Bolton, Major League Baseball first baseman for the Cleveland Indians
- Asya Branch, Miss Mississippi 2018, Miss Mississippi USA 2020, and Miss USA 2020
- Travis Childers, former congressman
- David L. Hill, nuclear physicist for the Manhattan Project
- Rhonda Keenum, Director of the Office of Public Liaison from 2005 to 2007
- Gene Kelton, singer-songwriter, blues musician, and band leader of Mean Gene Kelton & The Die Hards
- Brad Mattox, member of the Mississippi House of Representatives
- Orma Rinehart Smith, United States district judge of the United States District Court for the Northern District of Mississippi from 1968 to 1982
- Stanley Stubbs, head baseball coach for the Mississippi Valley State Delta Devils in 2022
- Hayden Thompson, is an American singer, songwriter, and rockabilly musician.

== See also ==
- List of census-designated places in Mississippi by population
