= List of lakes of Lee County, Arkansas =

There are at least 39 named lakes and reservoirs in Lee County, Arkansas.

== Lakes ==
- Anderson Lake, 34°44′34″N 090°41′03″W, el. 184 feet (56 m)
- Bain Lake, 34°38′34″N 090°37′41″W, el. 180 feet (55 m)
- Big Twin Lake, 34°51′30″N 090°41′57″W, el. 177 feet (54 m)
- Big Yancopin Lake, 34°49′57″N 090°40′46″W, el. 180 feet (55 m)
- Blue Hole, 34°43′05″N 090°34′39″W, el. 174 feet (53 m)
- Blue Lake, 34°52′17″N 090°38′15″W, el. 184 feet (56 m)
- Box Lake, 34°38′39″N 090°37′03″W, el. 174 feet (53 m)
- Brushy Lake, 34°38′39″N 090°37′16″W, el. 174 feet (53 m)
- Cannon Lake, 34°39′43″N 090°36′15″W, el. 174 feet (53 m)
- Cannon Lake, 34°39′31″N 090°35′36″W, el. 167 feet (51 m)
- Dry Lake, 34°52′44″N 090°39′45″W, el. 180 feet (55 m)
- Ellison Lake, 34°45′54″N 090°38′57″W, el. 171 feet (52 m)
- Goose Lake, 34°53′33″N 090°25′21″W, el. 187 feet (57 m)
- Johnson Lake, 34°47′08″N 090°39′22″W, el. 174 feet (53 m)
- L'Anguille Lake, 34°47′11″N 090°43′10″W, el. 174 feet (53 m)
- Laddie Lake, 34°39′07″N 090°37′11″W, el. 177 feet (54 m)
- Larkin Lake, 34°47′22″N 090°41′16″W, el. 171 feet (52 m)
- Little Mossy Lake, 34°41′56″N 090°56′10″W, el. 171 feet (52 m)
- Little Twin Lake, 34°51′21″N 090°42′17″W, el. 184 feet (56 m)
- Little Yancopin Lake, 34°50′09″N 090°40′51″W, el. 180 feet (55 m)
- Long Lake, 34°47′43″N 090°41′47″W, el. 171 feet (52 m)
- Long Lake, 34°50′42″N 090°39′52″W, el. 180 feet (55 m)
- Long Lake, 34°52′22″N 090°37′49″W, el. 184 feet (56 m)
- McCloud Lake, 34°43′06″N 090°58′47″W, el. 174 feet (53 m)
- McNulty Lake, 34°42′23″N 090°57′40″W, el. 174 feet (53 m)
- Midway Lake, 34°48′15″N 090°37′26″W, el. 177 feet (54 m)
- Midway Lake, 34°51′05″N 090°28′22″W, el. 180 feet (55 m)
- Millseed Lake, 34°53′58″N 090°30′14″W, el. 184 feet (56 m)
- Mossy Lake, 34°49′50″N 090°33′20″W, el. 190 feet (58 m)
- Old River Lake, 34°46′08″N 090°30′09″W, el. 177 feet (54 m)
- Piney Fork Lake, 34°43′11″N 090°59′37″W, el. 174 feet (53 m)
- Round Pond, 34°45′05″N 090°37′17″W, el. 194 feet (59 m)
- Rowing Lake, 34°46′44″N 090°42′17″W, el. 177 feet (54 m)
- Shenship Lake, 34°45′43″N 090°39′26″W, el. 180 feet (55 m)
- Tunica Lake, 34°39′25″N 090°29′05″W, el. 167 feet (51 m)
- Walnut Lake, 34°46′46″N 091°02′49″W, el. 180 feet (55 m)
- Whistling Lake, 34°47′25″N 091°03′47″W, el. 177 feet (54 m)

== Reservoirs ==
- Bear Creek Lake, 34°42′46″N 090°42′06″W, el. 243 feet (74 m)
- Crystal Lake, 34°45′42″N 090°43′30″W, el. 226 feet (69 m)

== See also ==
- List of lakes in Arkansas
