= List of census-designated places in Mississippi by population =

Map of the United States with Mississippi highlighted

Mississippi is a state located in the Southern United States that is divided into 82 counties and contains 63 census-designated places (CDPs) in 2018. All population data is based on the 2010 census.

== Census-designated places ==
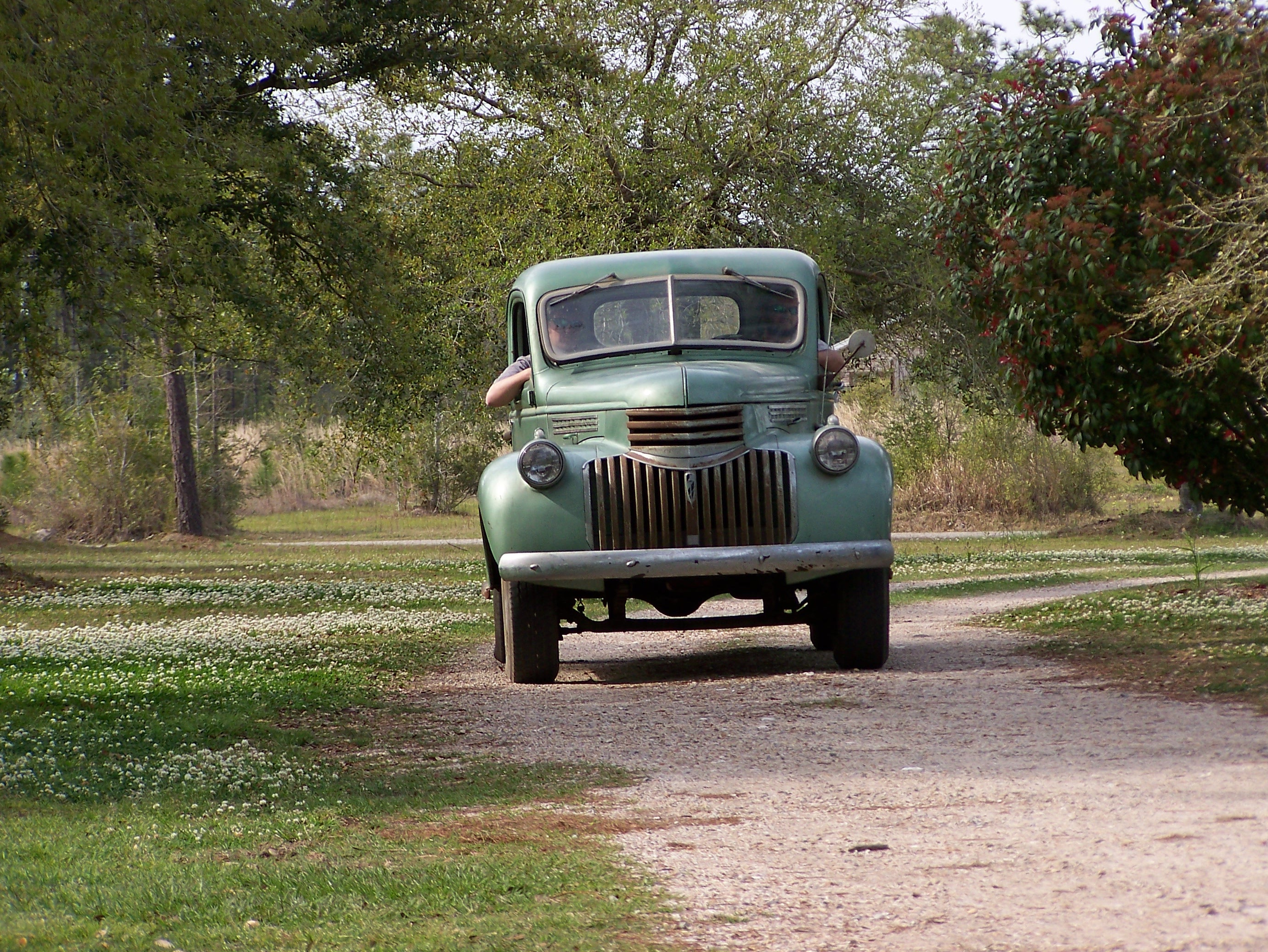
Truck in Latimer

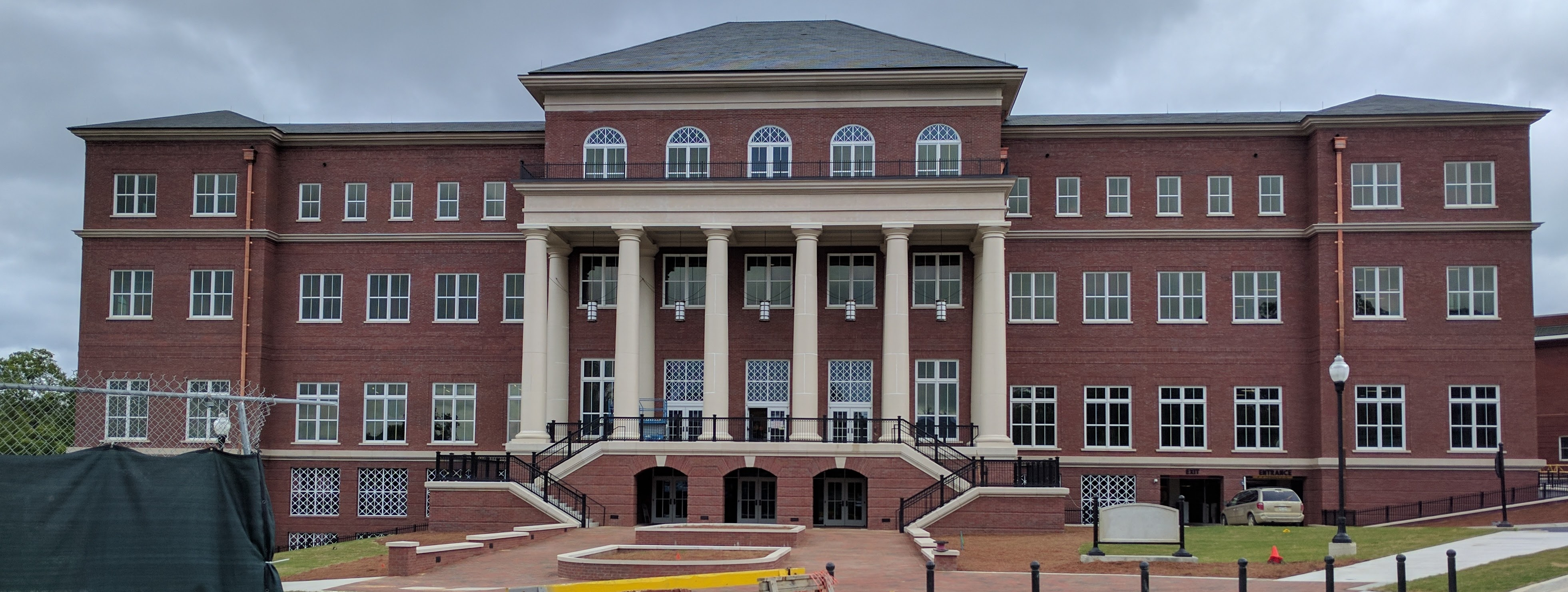
Old Main Academic Center at Mississippi State University

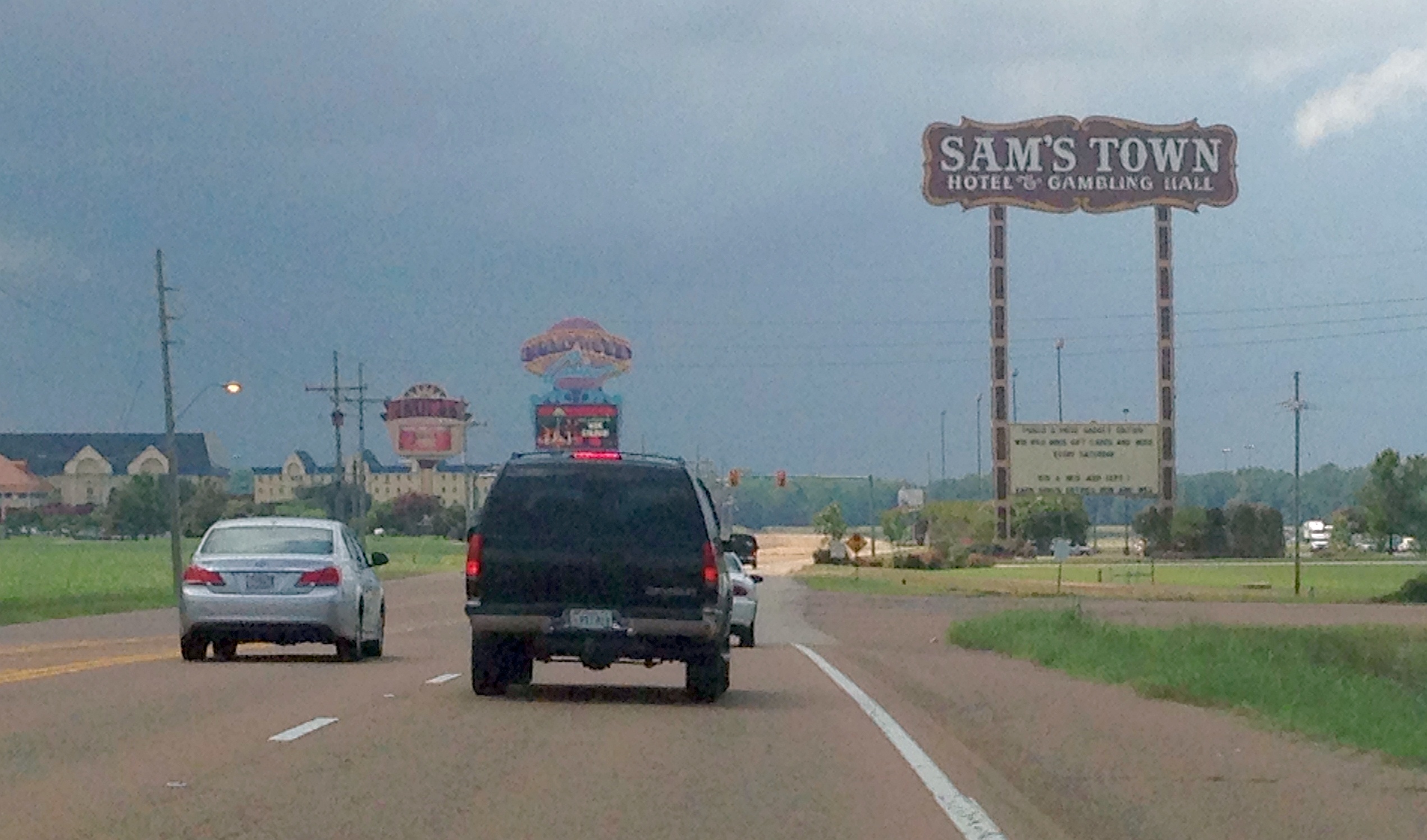
Casino Strip area in Tunica Resorts

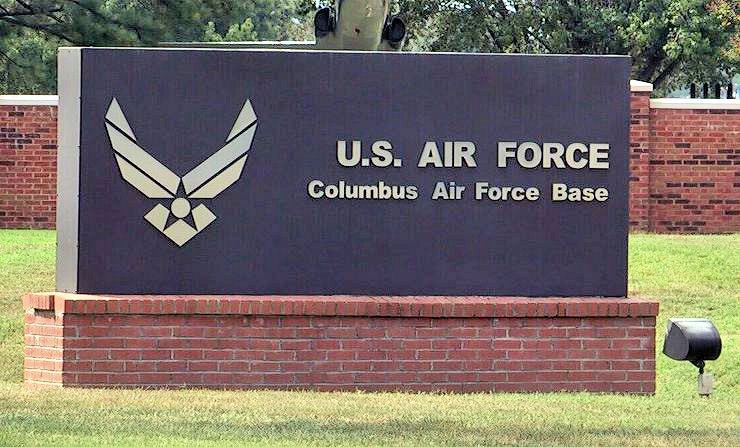
Columbus Air Force Base

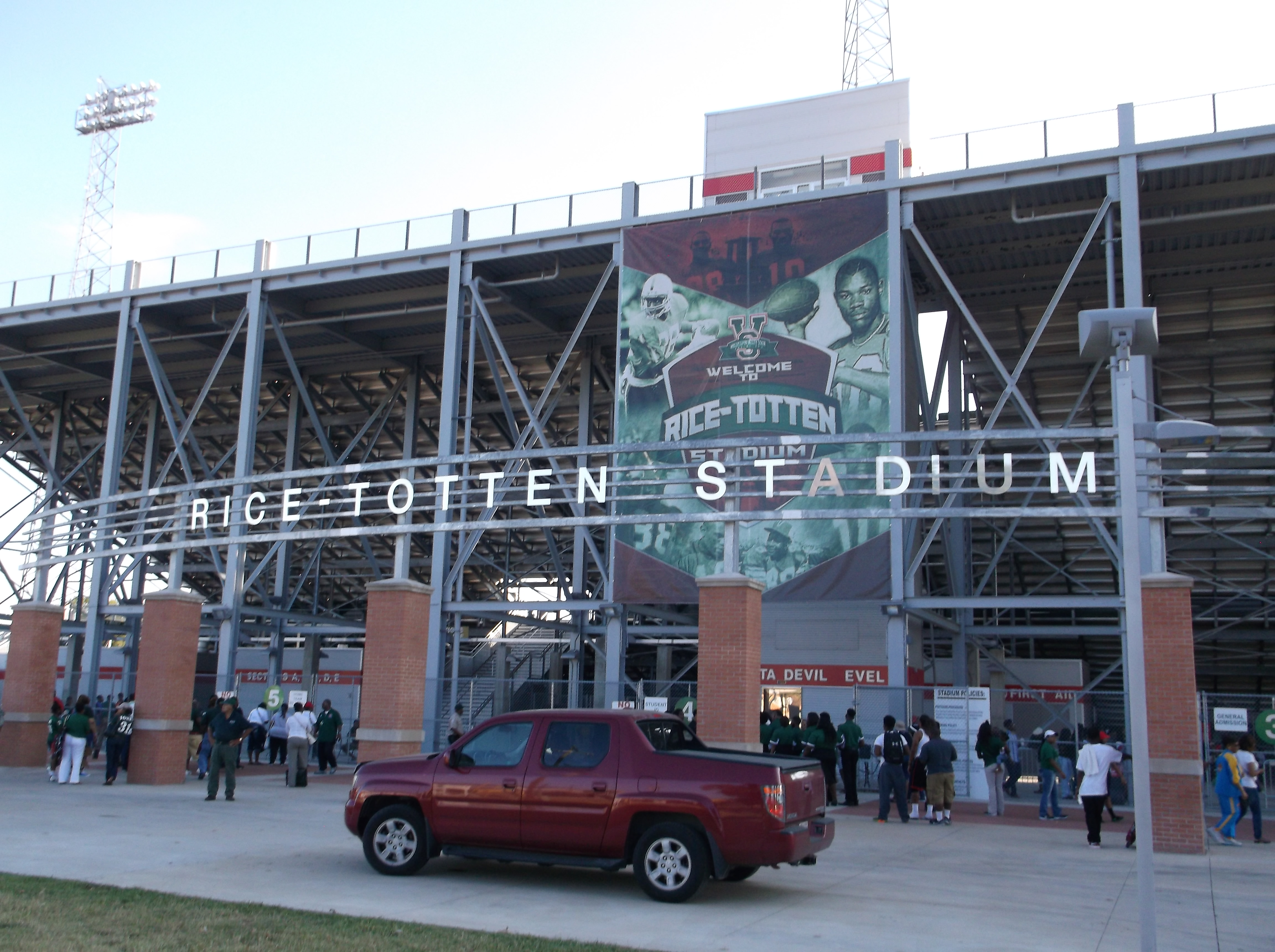
Rice–Totten Stadium at Mississippi Valley State University

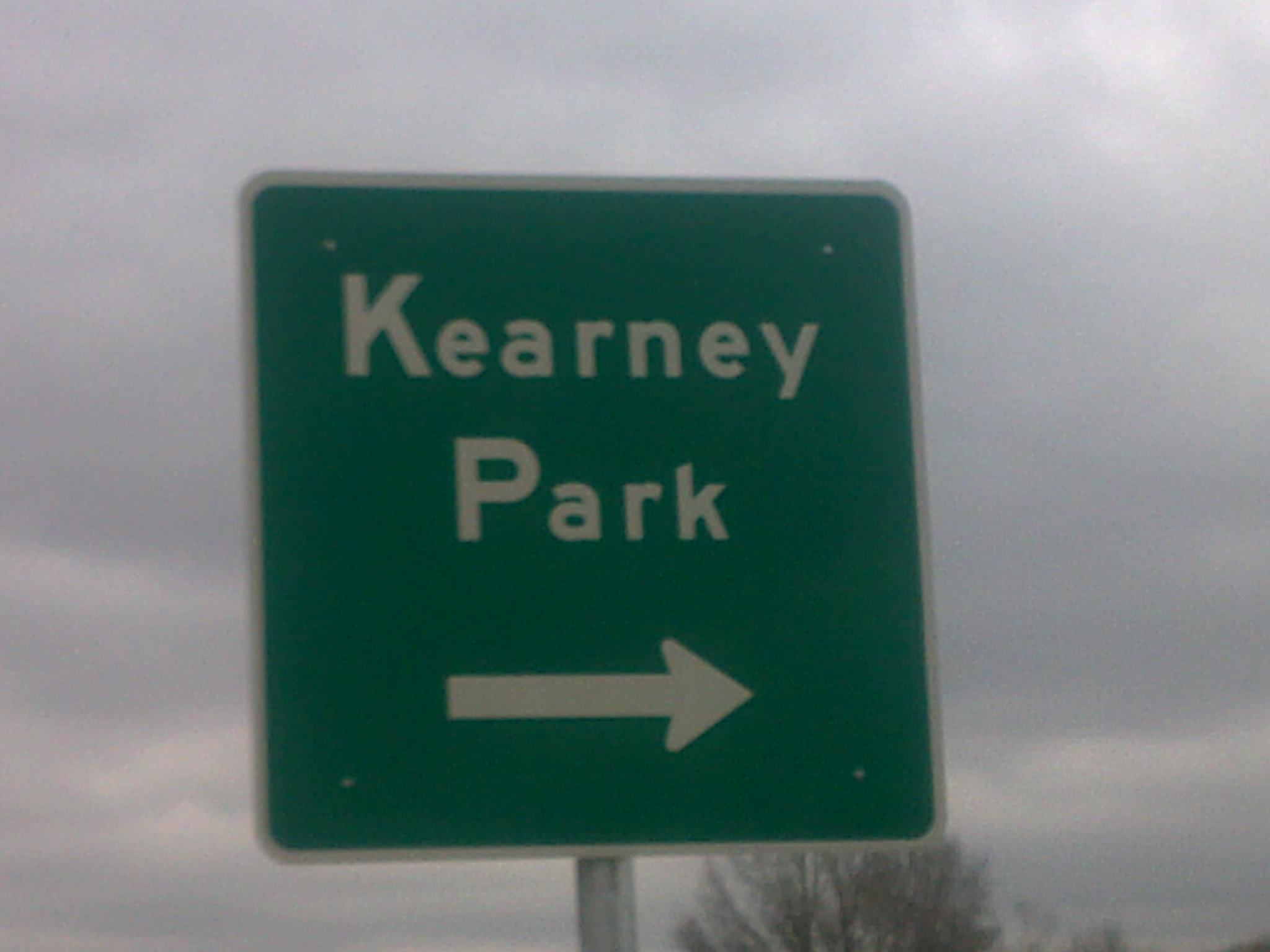
Kearney Park sign

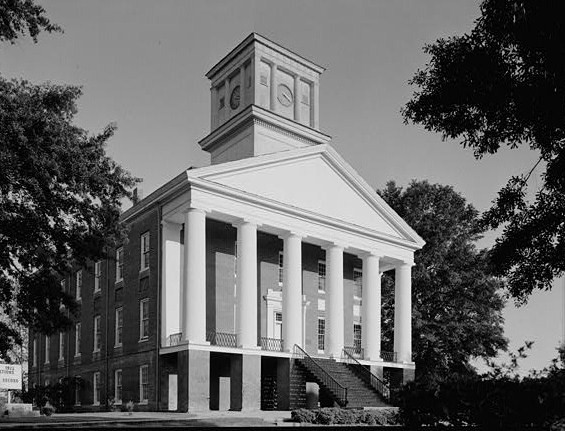
Oakland Memorial Chapel at Alcorn State University

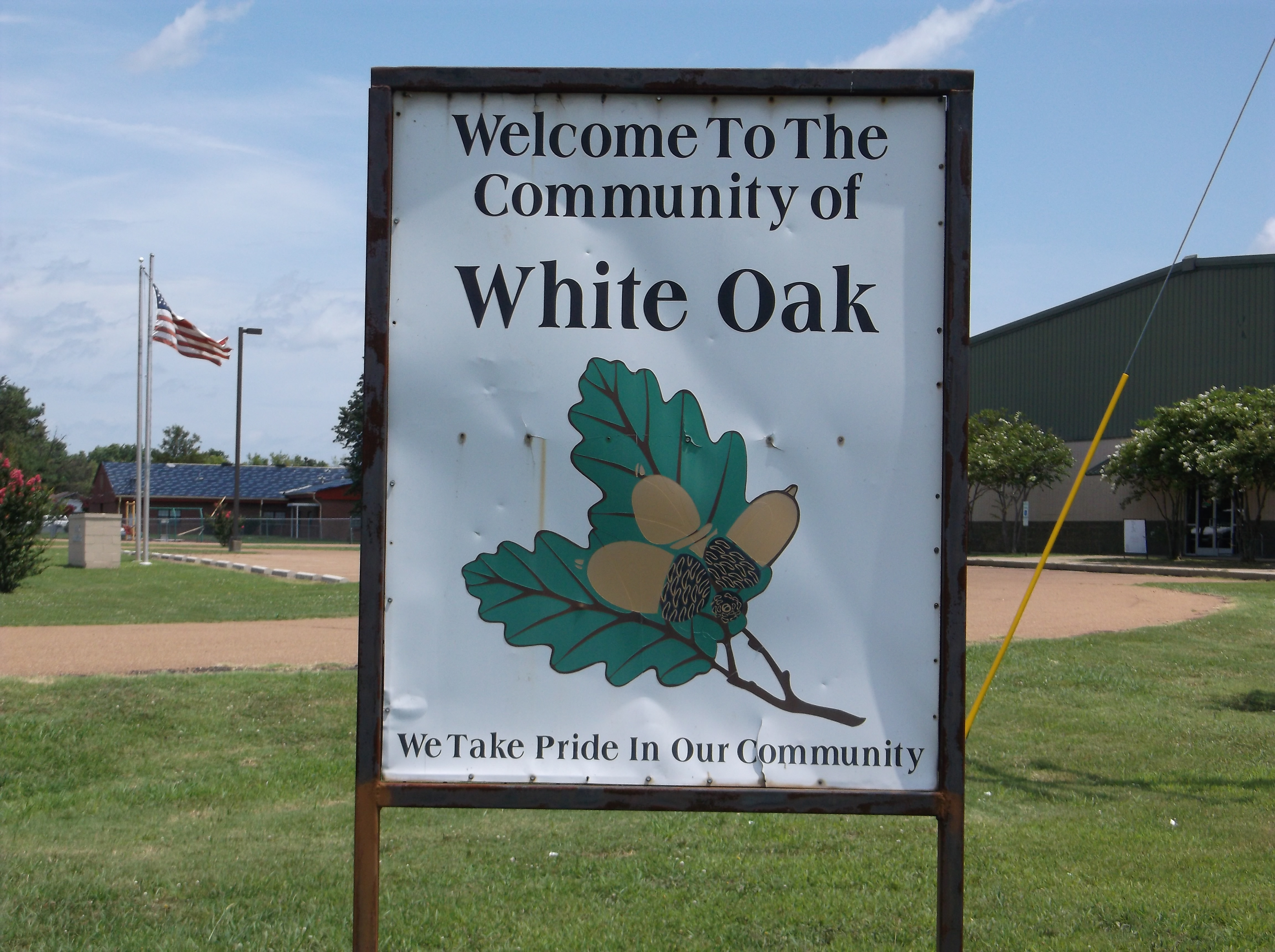
White Oak welcome sign

Name	County	Population (2010)	Land area	
Name	County	Population (2010)	sq mi	km^{2}
St. Martin	Jackson	7,730	4.25	11.0
Gulf Hills	Jackson	7,144	7.66	19.8
Latimer	Jackson	6,079	16.34	42.3
West Hattiesburg	Lamar	5,909	2.43	6.3
Vancleave	Jackson	5,886	43.15	111.8
Gulf Park Estates	Jackson	5,719	2.65	6.9
University	Lafayette	4,202	0.71	1.8
Mississippi State	Oktibbeha	4,005	2.34	6.1
Escatawpa	Jackson	3,722	6.68	17.3
Pearl River	Neshoba	3,601	31.03	80.4
Beechwood	Warren	3,426	6.26	16.2
New Hope	Lowndes	3,193	5.04	13.1
Nicholson	Pearl River	3,092	6.15	15.9
Lynchburg	DeSoto	2,437	1.93	5.0
Kiln	Hancock	2,238	13.16	34.1
Collinsville	Lauderdale	1,948	14.25	36.9
Tunica Resorts	Tunica	1,910	29.09	75.3
Hide-A-Way Lake	Pearl River	1,859	1.53	4.0
Bridgetown	DeSoto	1,742	2.21	5.7
Arnold Line	Lamar	1,719	1.65	4.3
Glendale	Forrest	1,657	1.63	4.2
Robinhood	Rankin	1,605	5.08	13.2
Hurley	Jackson	1,551	5.14	13.3
Cleary	Rankin	1,544	4.92	12.7
Nellieburg	Lauderdale	1,414	7.10	18.4
Morgantown	Adams	1,412	0.82	2.1
Sharon	Jones	1,406	8.55	22.1
Columbus AFB	Lowndes	1,373	1.55	4.0
Conehatta	Newton	1,342	15.69	40.6
Saucier	Harrison	1,342	6.89	17.8
Pearlington	Hancock	1,332	9.13	23.6
Lyman	Harrison	1,277	7.77	20.1
Rawls Springs	Forrest	1,254	1.83	4.7
Helena	Jackson	1,184	4.19	10.9
Mississippi Valley State University	Leflore	1,182	1.80	4.7
DeLisle	Harrison	1,147	5.23	13.5
Hillsboro	Scott	1,130	9.14	23.7
Meridian Station	Lauderdale	1,090	1.68	4.4
Wade	Jackson	1,074	6.17	16.0
Kearney Park	Madison	1,054	2.69	7.0
North Tunica	Tunica	1,035	0.58	1.5
Alcorn State University	Claiborne	1,017	2.38	6.2
Elliott	Grenada	990	4.52	11.7
Bogue Chitto	Kemper and Neshoba	887	6.34	16.4
Toomsuba	Lauderdale	773	2.86	7.4
White Oak	Tunica	692	0.46	1.2
Tucker	Neshoba	662	3.88	10.0
Mooresville	Lee	650	2.79	7.2
Cloverdale	Adams	645	1.14	3.0
Redwater	Leake	633	10.47	27.1
Big Point	Jackson	611	2.94	7.6
Foxworth	Marion	603	2.76	7.1
Holcomb	Grenada	600	4.75	12.3
New Hamilton	Monroe	553	3.55	9.2
Bogue Chitto	Lincoln	522	2.26	5.9
Buckatunna	Wayne	516	6.18	16.0
Standing Pine	Leake	504	3.49	9.0
Hamilton	Monroe	457	3.15	8.2
Lauderdale	Lauderdale	442	2.86	7.4
Clara	Wayne	410	3.89	10.1
Darling	Quitman	226	2.71	7.0
Farrell	Coahoma	218	1.30	3.4
Henderson Point	Harrison	170	1.06	2.7

== See also ==
- List of census-designated places in Mississippi
- List of counties in Mississippi
