= Bowdre =

Bowdre is a surname. Notable people with the surname include:

- Charlie Bowdre (1848–1880), American cowboy and outlaw
- Karon O. Bowdre (born 1955), American judge

== See also ==
- Bowdre, Mississippi
- Bowdre Township, Douglas County, Illinois
