= Maud, Mississippi =

- Unincorporated community
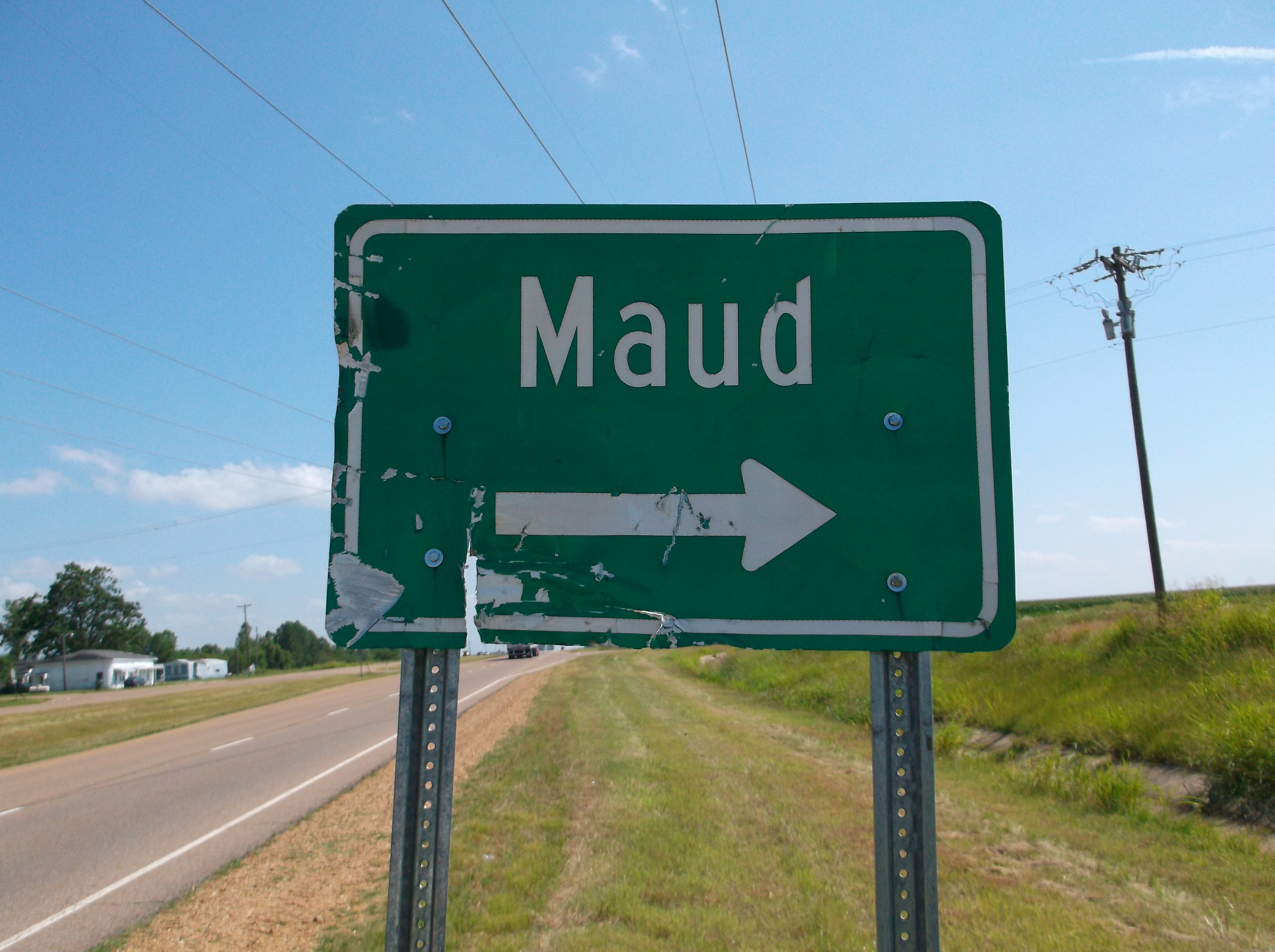
- Highway sign in Maud

- Location within Mississippi Location within the United States
- Coordinates: 34°33′43″N 90°26′13″W
- Country: United States
- State: Mississippi
- County: Tunica
- Elevation: 187 ft (57 m)
- Time zone: UTC-6 (Central (CST))
  - Summer (DST): UTC-5 (CDT)
- ZIP code: 38626
- Area code: 662
- GNIS feature ID: 673247

Maud is an unincorporated community located in Tunica County, Mississippi, United States. Maud is approximately 3 miles (4.8 km) north of Dundee and approximately 4 miles (6.4 km) west of Dubbs.
