= Bowdre, Mississippi =

- Unincorporated community
- Location within Mississippi Location within the United States
- Coordinates: 34°47′48″N 90°19′56″W
- Country: United States
- State: Mississippi
- County: Tunica
- Elevation: 200 ft (61 m)
- Time zone: UTC-6 (Central (CST))
  - Summer (DST): UTC-5 (CDT)
- ZIP code: 38664
- Area code: 662
- GNIS feature ID: 692158

Bowdre is an unincorporated community located near U.S. Route 61 in Tunica County, Mississippi. Bowdre was the home of the Penn Owen plantation with no other community functions outside of agriculture associated with that family-run business. Bowdre was, until the late 1960s, also located on a busy Illinois Central Railroad line (since relocated) and along the former route of Mississippi Highway 61. Bowdre is approximately 2 miles (3.2 km) southwest of Robinsonville and approximately 4 miles (6.4 km) north of Hollywood. Bowdre was the site of a railroad accident on December 21, 1941, when eight members of a family employed on the plantation were killed attempting to cross the tracks in front of the Penn Owen company store.
