= Peyton, Tunica County, Mississippi =

Peyton, Mississippi
- Ghost town
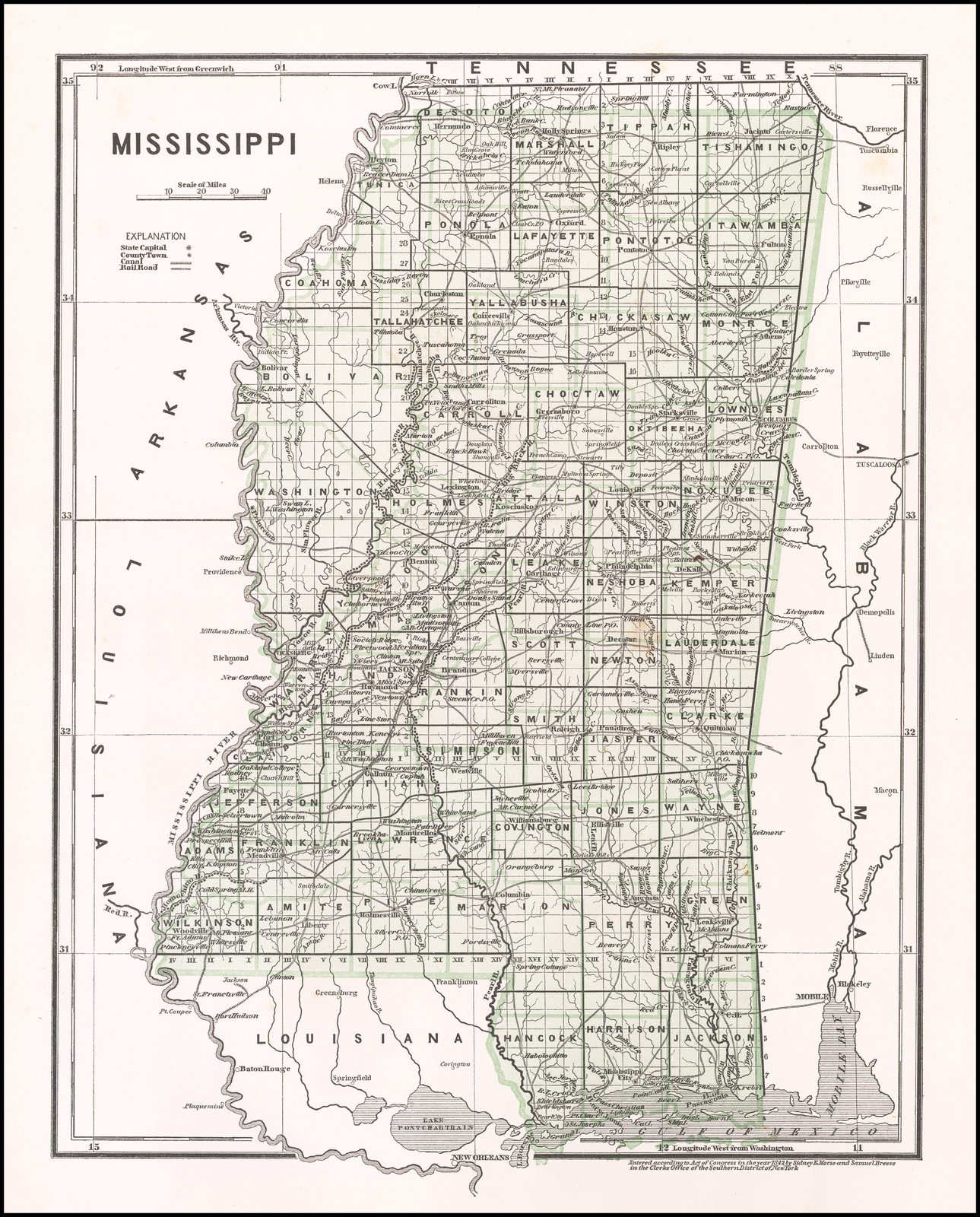
- 1842 map showing Peyton

- Location within Mississippi
- Coordinates: 34°37′20″N 90°28′30″W
- Country: United States
- State: Mississippi
- County: Tunica
- Elevation: 190 ft (58 m)
- Time zone: UTC-6 (Central (CST))
  - Summer (DST): UTC-5 (CDT)
- GNIS feature ID: 684866

Peyton is a ghost town in Tunica County, Mississippi, United States.

Once a thriving port on the Mississippi River, Peyton today is covered by farmfield, forest, and a portion of the Mississippi Levee. Nothing remains of the original settlement but a church called “Rising Sun Baptist Church”. Where some original members and decedents of original members still attend. They even have a “Coming Home” service every year.

After a damaging flood in Commerce in 1843, the county seat was temporarily moved to Peyton. Six months later, it was moved back to Commerce.
