= Clayton, Mississippi =

- Unincorporated community
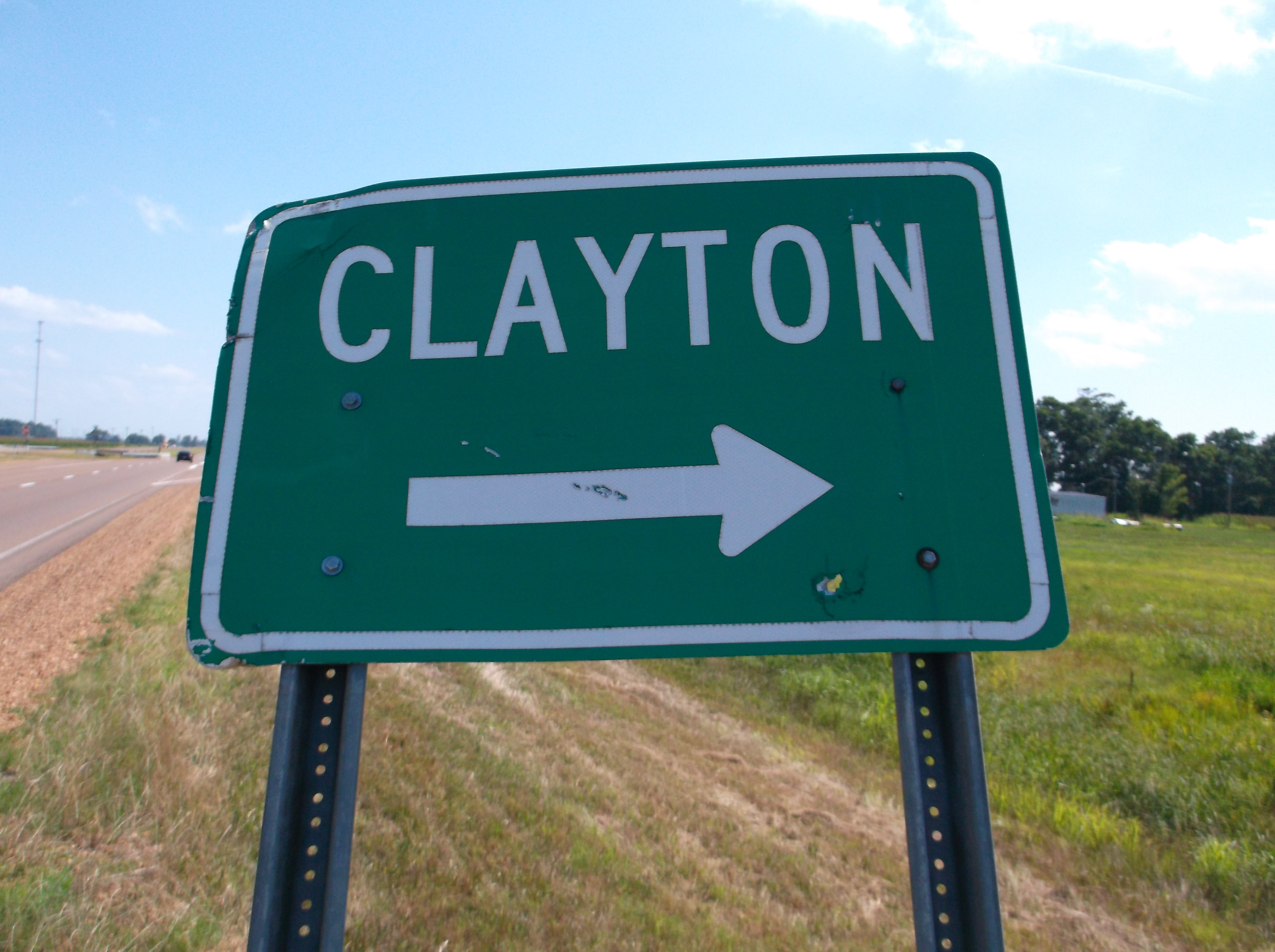
- Highway sign just outside of Clayton

- Location within Mississippi Location within the United States
- Coordinates: 34°36′00″N 90°24′59″W
- Country: United States
- State: Mississippi
- County: Tunica
- Elevation: 194 ft (59 m)
- Time zone: UTC-6 (Central (CST))
  - Summer (DST): UTC-5 (CDT)
- Area code: 662
- GNIS feature ID: 668537

Clayton is an unincorporated community in Tunica County, Mississippi. Clayton is 6 miles (9.7 km) south-southwest of Tunica. U.S. Route 61 passes just outside the community.

== Governmenty ==
the community Is served by the Tunica County School District

As of 2025, Clayton is represented in the Mississippi State House by Cedric Burnett, in Mississippi's 9th state house district. In the state senate, it is represented by Reginald Jackson, in Mississippi's 11th state senate district. In the US Congress, Clayton sits in Mississippi's 2nd congressional district and is represented by Bennie Thompson.
