= Lost Lake, Mississippi =

- Unincorporated community
- Location within Mississippi Location within the United States
- Coordinates: 34°47′01″N 90°14′38″W
- Country: United States
- State: Mississippi
- County: Tunica
- Elevation: 194 ft (59 m)
- Time zone: UTC-6 (Central (CST))
  - Summer (DST): UTC-5 (CDT)
- Area code: 662
- GNIS feature ID: 692022

Lost Lake is an unincorporated community in Tunica County, Mississippi, United States.
