= Clack, Mississippi =

- Unincorporated community
- Location within Mississippi Location within the United States
- Coordinates: 34°50′45″N 90°17′35″W
- Country: United States
- State: Mississippi
- County: Tunica
- Elevation: 203 ft (62 m)
- Time zone: UTC-6 (Central (CST))
  - Summer (DST): UTC-5 (CDT)
- ZIP code: 38664
- GNIS feature ID: 668497

Clack is an unincorporated community in Tunica County, Mississippi, United States, located along Old U.S. Highway 61.

The Mississippi levee traverses the west side of Clack. Beyond the levee is Old River Lake, once part of the contiguous Mississippi River.

Clack was established as a flagstop on the Yazoo and Mississippi Valley Railroad, built in the 1880s. It was named for Phil Clack, who owned the land near the railroad stop.

Clack had a post office from 1892 to 1927, and Clack Store served as a commissary and train station.

In 1941, as part of a Fisk University/Library of Congress study, researchers Alan Lomax and John Wesley Work III used Clack Store as a location to record blues musicians Son House, Willie Brown, Leroy Williams, and Fiddlin' Joe Martin. Locomotives can be heard in the recording. A Mississippi Blues Trail marker recognizing Son House was erected in Clack in 2007.

Clack Store has since been demolished, and the store's sign was moved to the Delta Blues Museum in Clarksdale.

Clack today is surrounded by RV parks and the casinos of Tunica Resorts.
