= Austin, Mississippi =

- Census-designated place
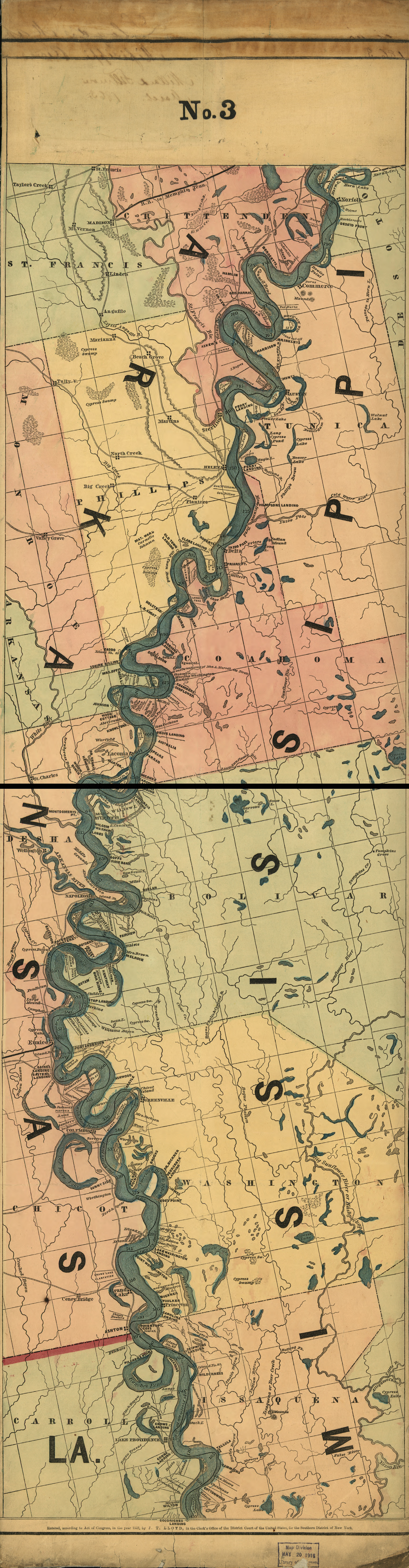
- 1862 map showing Austin A map of Austin in 1862

- Location within Mississippi Location within the United States
- Coordinates: 34°38′32″N 90°26′52″W
- Country: United States
- State: Mississippi
- County: Tunica

Area
  - Total: 0.10 sq mi (0.26 km^{2})
  - Land: 0.10 sq mi (0.26 km^{2})
  - Water: 0 sq mi (0.00 km^{2})
- Elevation: 194 ft (59 m)

Population (2020)
  - Total: 51
  - Density: 507.4/sq mi (195.89/km^{2})
- Time zone: UTC-6 (Central (CST))
  - Summer (DST): UTC-5 (CDT)
- ZIP code: 38676
- GNIS feature ID: 2812747

Austin is a census-designated place (CDP) and unincorporated community in Tunica County, Mississippi, United States. Per the 2020 Census, the population was 51.

Once a thriving shipping port on the Mississippi River, Austin served as county seat from 1847 to 1888. Earlier county seats were Commerce and Peyton.

== History ==
Austin was founded in 1847 and named for Austin Miller, who donated the land on which the town and a courthouse were built.

Austin was burned in 1863 by Union soldiers of the Mississippi Marine Brigade under the command of Alfred W. Ellet. Two houses were spared.

The town rebuilt and was incorporated in 1871, though it is no longer incorporated.

In 1884, the area was flooded when a nearby levee broke. When waters receded, a large sandbar had been left between the town and the Mississippi River, and steamboats could no longer land. The completion of the Louisville, New Orleans and Texas Railway 3 mi (4.8 km) east of Austin in the late 1880s further contributed to its isolation.

In 1888, the county seat was moved to Tunica, a more accessible location. According to a 1906 article, "Austin, the former seat of Tunica county, was situated on the Mississippi river, and at one time claimed a population of over 2,000. It did a large river and inland trade. A substantial courthouse, costing $35,000, was erected there in 1868. That is the only building still standing in the deserted and dismantled town."

The construction of the Hardin Cutoff in 1942, which created Tunica Lake, moved the Mississippi River an additional 7 mi (11 km) west of Austin.

== Demographics ==
Historical population
Census	Pop.	Note	%±
2020	51		—
U.S. Decennial Census; 2020

Austin first appeared as a census designated place in the 2020 U.S. census.

=== Racial and ethnic composition ===
Austin CDP, Mississippi – Racial and ethnic composition Note: the US Census treats Hispanic/Latino as an ethnic category. This table excludes Latinos from the racial categories and assigns them to a separate category. Hispanics/Latinos may be of any race.
Race / Ethnicity (NH = Non-Hispanic)	Pop 2020	% 2020
White alone (NH)	3	5.88%
Black or African American alone (NH)	44	86.27%
Native American or Alaska Native alone (NH)	0	0.00%
Asian alone (NH)	0	0.00%
Native Hawaiian or Pacific Islander alone (NH)	0	0.00%
Other race alone (NH)	0	0.00%
Mixed race or Multiracial (NH)	3	5.88%
Hispanic or Latino (any race)	1	1.96%
Total	51	100.00%

== Education ==
Residents are in the Tunica County School District. Rosa Fort High School is the district's comprehensive high school.

== Notable person ==
- Sport McAllister (1874–1962), professional baseball player.
