= Mississippi Highway 309 =

State Highway in Mississippi

Mississippi Highway 309

Route information
- Maintained by MDOT
- Length: 25.777 mi (41.484 km)
- Existed: 1956–present

Major junctions
- South end: MS 4 near Chulahoma
- I-22 / US 78 in Byhalia; I-269 / MS 304 near Byhalia
- North end: Byhalia Road at the Tennessee state line near Barton

Location
- Country: United States
- State: Mississippi
- Counties: Marshall

Highway system
- Mississippi State Highway System; Interstate; US; State
← MS 308	→ I-310

Mississippi Highway 309 (MS 309) is a two-lane, north–south state highway in Marshall County, Mississippi. It runs 26.1 miles (42.0 km) from the Tennessee state line south through western Marshall County to its southern terminus at MS 4, just east of the community of Chulahoma.

== Route description ==
MS 309 begins at the western edge of the community of Chulahoma at an intersection with MS 4. It winds its way northwest through a mix of farmland and wooded areas for several miles, where it makes both a sharp left, and a sharp right, as it passes through the community of Watson. The highway now enters the town of Byhalia at an interchange with Interstate 22 (I-22)/U.S. Route 78 (US 78) at their exit 14, and it travels through some neighborhoods before passing directly through downtown, where it has an intersection with MS 178. MS 309 leaves downtown as it crosses a railroad track, traveling north through more neighborhoods before leaving Byhalia at an interchange with I-269/MS 304 (exit 18). The highway travels northward through farmland to cross the Coldwater River and pass through the community of Barton, where it has an intersection with MS 302, before coming to an end at the Tennessee state line, with the road continuing north as Byhalia Road into the city of Collierville.

The entire length of Mississippi Highway 309 is a rural two-lane state highway, located entirely in Marshall County.

== Major intersections ==
The entire route is in Marshall County.

Location	mi	km	Destinations	Notes
	0.000	0.000	MS 4 – Senatobia, Holly Springs	Southern terminus
Byhalia	15.991– 16.211	25.735– 26.089	I-22 / US 78 – Tupelo, Memphis	I-22 exit 14
Byhalia	17.279	27.808	MS 178	
	18.685– 18.988	30.071– 30.558	I-269 / MS 304 – Tunica, Collierville	I-269 exit 18
Barton	23.504– 23.581	37.826– 37.950	MS 302	
	25.777	41.484	Byhalia Road north	Continuation into Tennessee
1.000 mi = 1.609 km; 1.000 km = 0.621 mi
