= Booneville School District (Mississippi) =

School district in Mississippi

Coordinates: 34.658544°N 88.564805°W

The Booneville School District is a public school district based in Booneville, Mississippi (USA).

The district includes innermost portions of Booneville.

== Schools ==
- Booneville Middle/High School
- Anderson Elementary School

== Demographics ==
=== 2006-07 school year ===
There were a total of 1,380 students enrolled in the Booneville School District during the 2006–2007 school year. The gender makeup of the district was 48% female and 52% male. The racial makeup of the district was 20.22% African American, 77.75% White, 1.09% Hispanic, 0.72% Asian, and 0.22% Native American. 34.1% of the district's students were eligible to receive free lunch.

=== Previous school years ===
School Year	Enrollment	Gender Makeup		Racial Makeup				
School Year	Enrollment	Female	Male	Asian	African American	Hispanic	Native American	White
2005-06	1,443	48%	52%	0.76%	20.79%	1.11%	0.07%	77.27%
2004-05	1,426	48%	52%	0.77%	21.74%	0.49%	0.07%	76.93%
2003-04	1,382	46%	54%	0.36%	22.14%	0.51%	0.07%	76.92%
2002-03	1,364	47%	53%	0.51%	21.04%	0.44%	0.07%	77.93%

== Accountability statistics ==
	2006-07	2005-06	2004-05	2003-04	2002-03
District Accreditation Status	Accredited	Accredited	Accredited	Accredited	Accredited
School Performance Classifications
Level 5 (Superior Performing) Schools	2	2	3	3	2
Level 4 (Exemplary) Schools	0	0	0	0	1
Level 3 (Successful) Schools	0	0	0	0	0
Level 2 (Under Performing) Schools	0	0	0	0	0
Level 1 (Low Performing) Schools	0	0	0	0	0
Not Assigned	0	0	0	0	0

== See also ==
- List of school districts in Mississippi
