= Evansville, Mississippi =

- Unincorporated community
- Location within Mississippi Location within the United States
- Coordinates: 34°38′25″N 90°23′19″W
- Country: United States
- State: Mississippi
- County: Tunica
- Elevation: 194 ft (59 m)
- Time zone: UTC-6 (Central (CST))
  - Summer (DST): UTC-5 (CDT)
- ZIP code: 38676
- Area code: 662
- GNIS feature ID: 669837

Evansville is an unincorporated community in Tunica County, Mississippi, United States. Evansville is approximately 3 miles (4.8 km) south of Tunica and approximately 2 miles (3.2 km) west of White Oak.

It is named for Clayton Evans, an early settler.

The Evansville Mounds are listed on the National Register of Historic Places.
