= Tunica Lake =

- Location within Arkansas Location within the United States
- Location: Lee County, Arkansas; Tunica County, Mississippi; United States
- Coordinates: 34.650032°N 90.494303°W
- Type: Oxbow lake
- Basin countries: United States
- Max. length: 15 mi (24 km)
- Surface area: 2,500 acres (1,000 ha)
- Surface elevation: 157 ft (48 m) at normal pool

Tunica Lake (also called Tunica Cutoff) is an oxbow lake located in Lee County, Arkansas and Tunica County, Mississippi. The Arkansas-Mississippi border follows the center of the narrow, curving lake.

== History ==
Prior to 1942, the north-south flowing Mississippi River curved east into Mississippi, flowed along Tunica Lake (then called "Fox Island Bend" and "OK Bend"), and then continued its north-south route.

In 1933, the United States Army Corps of Engineers began construction of 13 cutoffs along the lower Mississippi River.

Previous cutoffs had been constructed along the river, and were of commercial benefit because they allowed ships to bypass lengthy U-shaped bends. Typically, cutoffs were created by digging a channel across a peninsula, leaving the bypassed bend to form an oxbow lake.

Tunica Lake was created when the "Hardin Cutoff" was constructed across "Hardin Point" peninsula in 1942. It was the last cutoff constructed during that period.

== Communities ==
All the communities near Tunica Lake are located in Mississippi.

The present-day town of Austin was historically located directly along the east bank of Fox Island Bend. In 1884, the area was flooded when a nearby levee broke, and when the floodwaters receded, steamboats could no longer land because a large sandbar had been left between Austin and the Mississippi River.

North of Austin is the community of "Fox Island".

At the northern end of Tunica Lake is a small community with cottages, fishing camps, bait shops, an RV park, and four boatramps.

== Characteristics ==
A small channel at "Shoo Fly Bar" on the south end of the lake connects to the Mississippi River. This channel permits spawning fish to enter Tunica Lake, and provides recreational boaters with access to the river. The channel also causes water levels in Tunica Lake to rise and fall along with the seasonal variations in water level in the Mississippi River.

Fish species found in Tunica Lake include bowfin, bream (bluegill), buffalo, channel catfish, common carp, crappie, drum, flathead catfish, gar, green sunfish, largemouth bass, white bass, and yellow bass.

Although the lake can be legally fished with either an Arkansas or Mississippi fishing license, all vehicles and most recreational boats can only access the lake from Mississippi.

== In popular culture ==
Mississippi author Larry Brown mentioned the lake in his 2003 novel The Rabbit Factory:

It seemed his daddy had been dead forever now. He still thought about him often, though, and about the times he'd taken him fishing for fat bluegills at Tunica Cutoff. They used to catch piles of them.
