= Hollywood, Mississippi =

- Unincorporated community
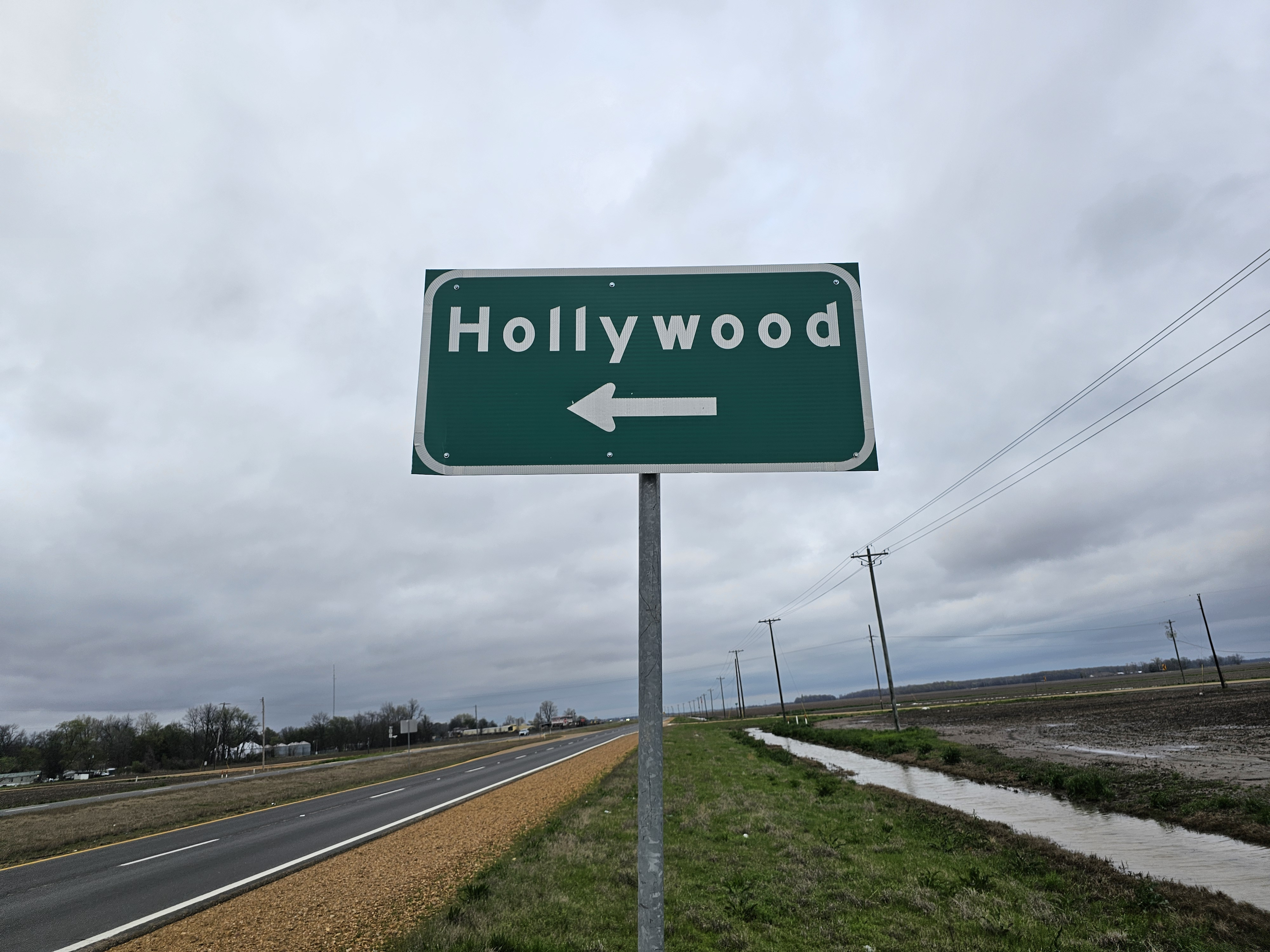
- Highway sign just outside of Hollywood

- Location within Mississippi Location within the United States
- Coordinates: 34°44′43″N 90°21′29″W
- Country: United States
- State: Mississippi
- County: Tunica
- Elevation: 197 ft (60 m)
- Time zone: UTC-6 (Central (CST))
  - Summer (DST): UTC-5 (CDT)
- GNIS feature ID: 671340

Hollywood is an unincorporated community located near U.S. Route 61 in Tunica County, Mississippi, United States. It is approximately 4 miles (6.4 km) north of North Tunica, approximately 5 miles (8.0 km) north of Tunica, and approximately 22 miles (35 km) south of Memphis, Tennessee.

== History ==
Hollywood was located along the now-abandoned Illinois Central Gulf Railroad. The population in 1900 was 291.
