= Dubbs, Mississippi =

- Unincorporated community
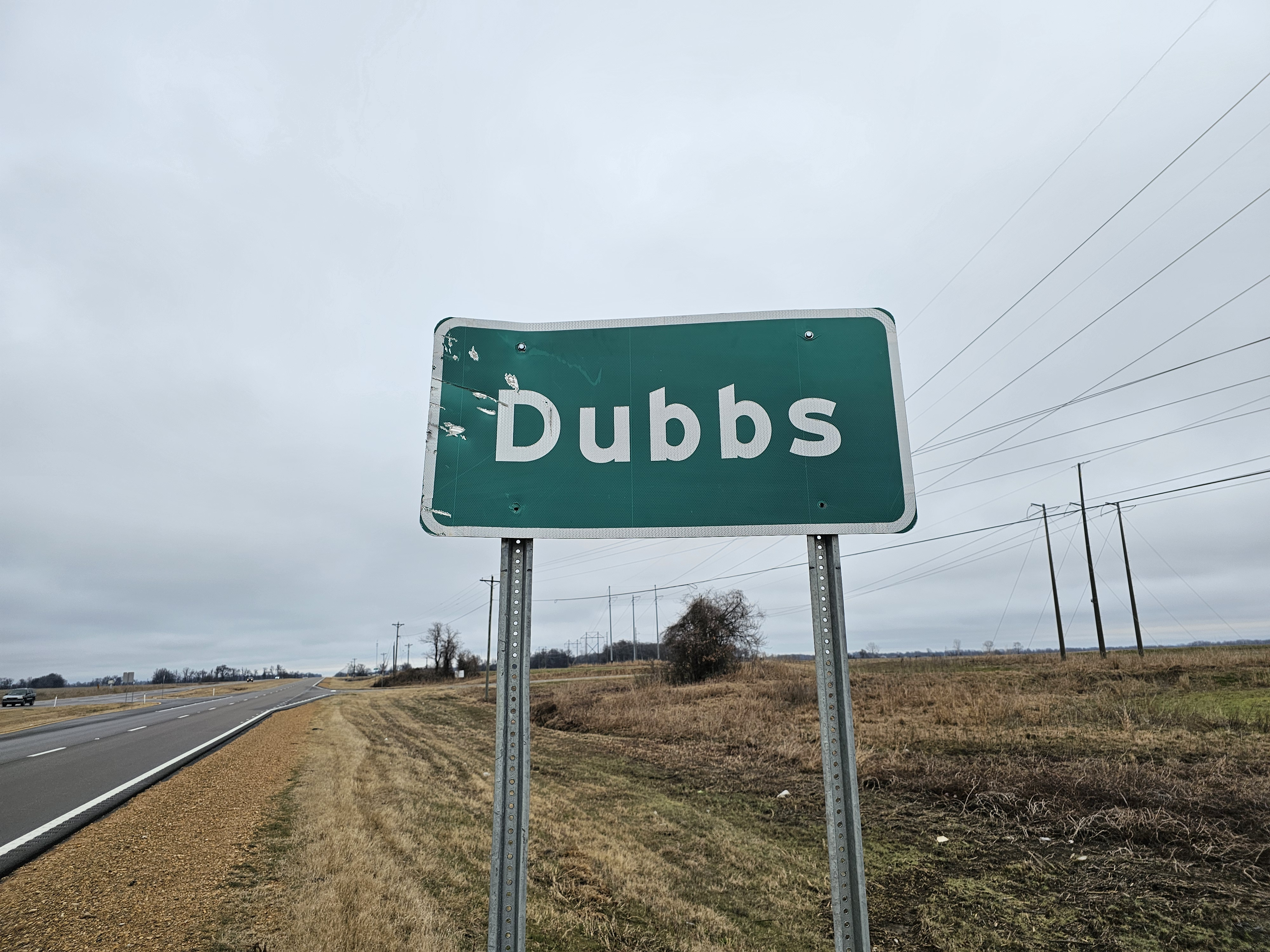
- Highway sign outside of Dubbs

- Location within Mississippi Location within the United States
- Coordinates: 34°34′06″N 90°22′25″W
- Country: United States
- State: Mississippi
- County: Tunica
- Elevation: 184 ft (56 m)
- Time zone: UTC-6 (Central (CST))
  - Summer (DST): UTC-5 (CDT)
- Zip code: 38626
- Area code: 662
- GNIS feature ID: 669464

Dubbs is an unincorporated community in Tunica County, Mississippi, United States. Dubbs is 8 miles (13 km) south of Tunica.
