= White Oak, Mississippi =

- CDP
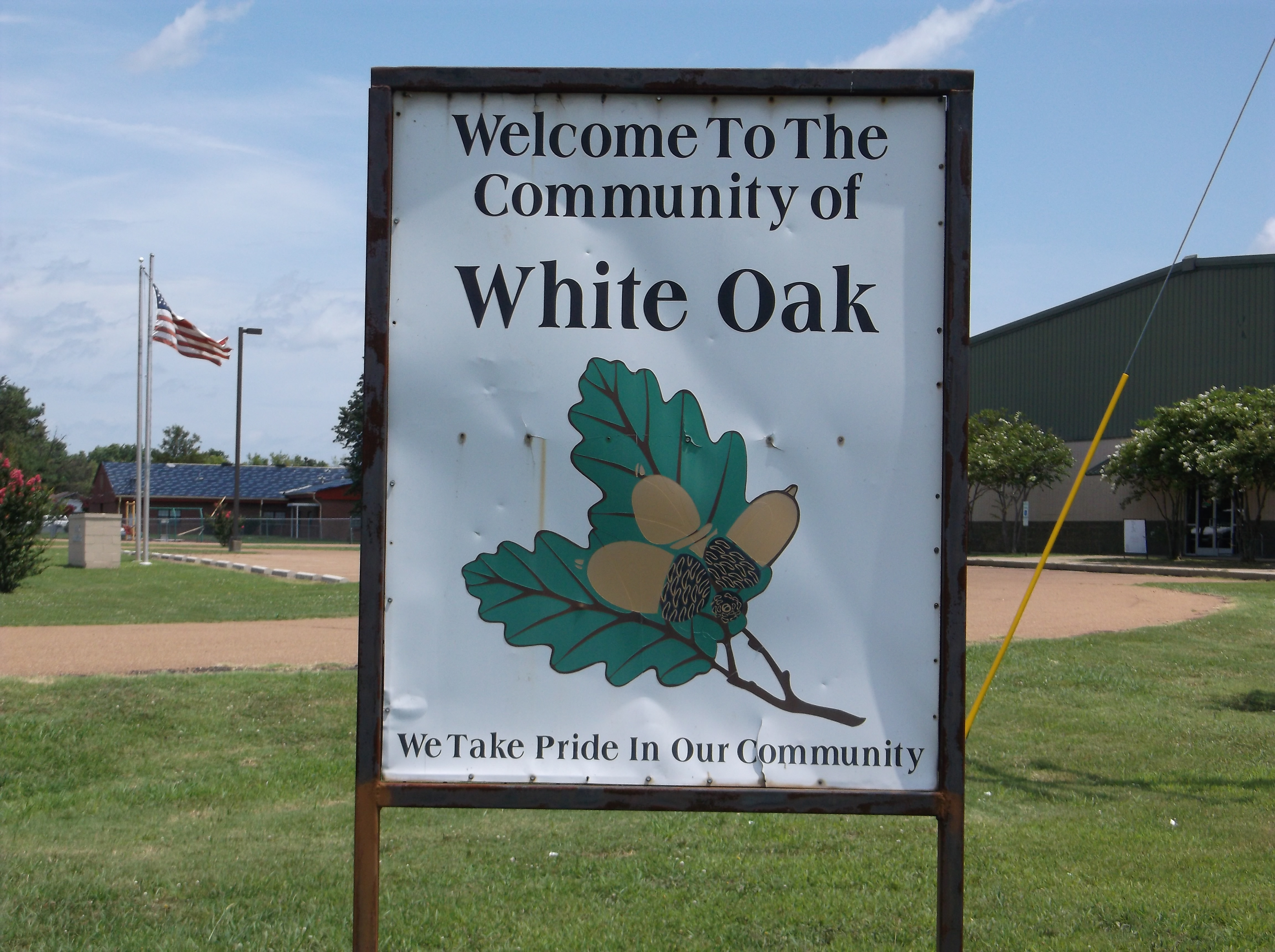
- Welcome sign in White Oak located on White Oak Road

- Location within Mississippi
- Coordinates: 34°38′38″N 90°20′58″W
- Country: United States
- State: Mississippi
- County: Tunica

Area
  - Total: 0.46 sq mi (1.20 km^{2})
  - Land: 0.46 sq mi (1.20 km^{2})
  - Water: 0 sq mi (0.00 km^{2})
- Elevation: 184 ft (56 m)

Population (2020)
  - Total: 595
  - Density: 1,287.8/sq mi (497.21/km^{2})
- Time zone: UTC-6 (Central (CST))
  - Summer (DST): UTC-5 (CDT)
- ZIP code: 38676
- Area code: 662
- GNIS feature ID: 2586614

White Oak is a census-designated place (CDP) located on Mississippi Highway 4 in Tunica County, Mississippi. White Oak is approximately 2 miles (3.2 km) east of Evansville and approximately 8 miles (13 km) west of Savage. The population at the 2020 census was 692.

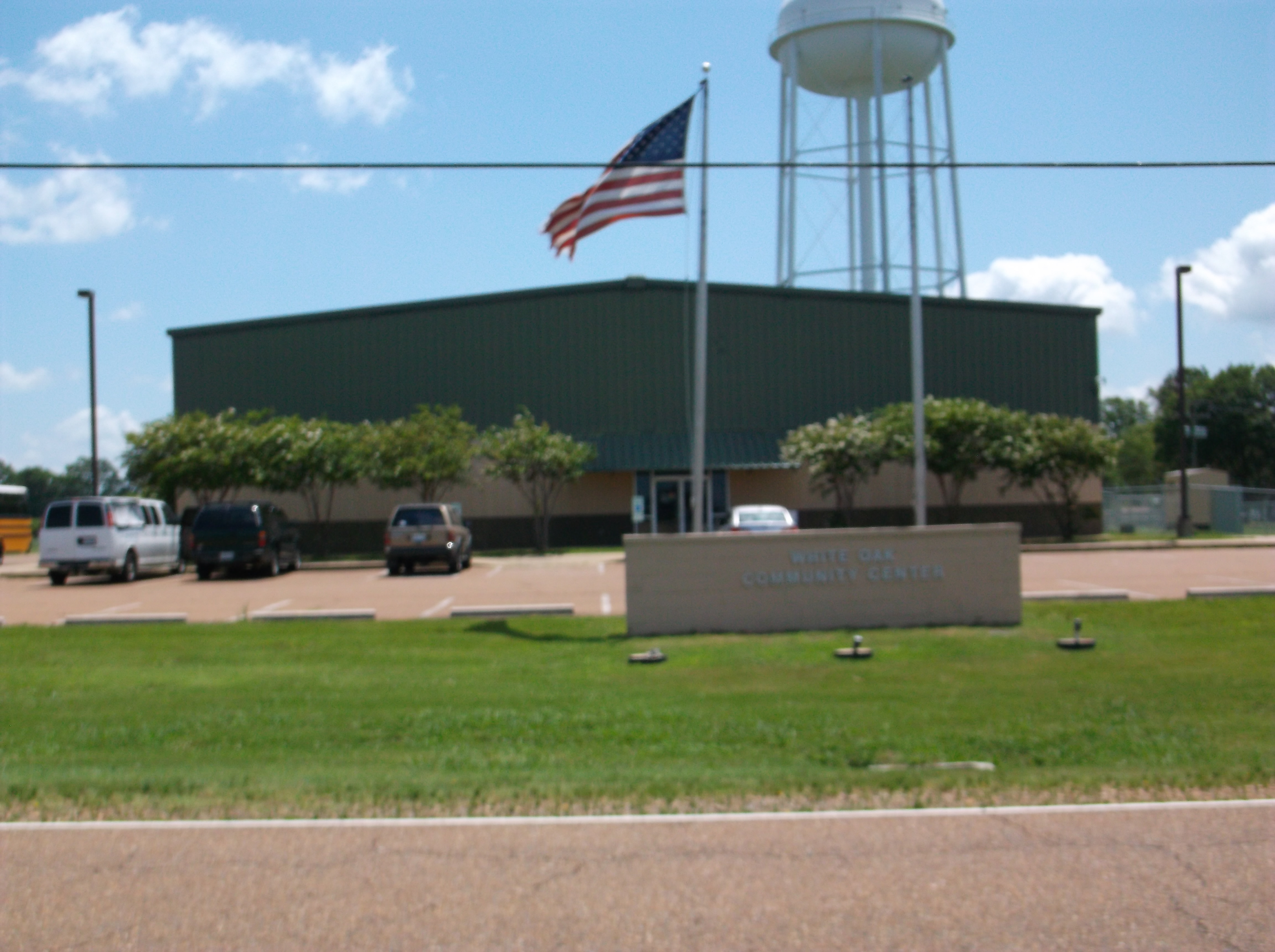
White Oak Community Center and water tower

== Demographics ==
Historical population
Census	Pop.	Note	%±
2010	692		—
2020	595		−14.0%
U.S. Decennial Census; 2010 2020

White Oak first appeared as a census designated place in the 2010 U.S. census.

=== 2020 census ===
White Oak CDP, Mississippi – Racial and ethnic composition Note: the US Census treats Hispanic/Latino as an ethnic category. This table excludes Latinos from the racial categories and assigns them to a separate category. Hispanics/Latinos may be of any race.
Race / Ethnicity (NH = Non-Hispanic)	Pop 2010	Pop 2020	% 2010	% 2020
White alone (NH)	10	1	1.45%	0.17%
Black or African American alone (NH)	672	585	97.11%	98.32%
Native American or Alaska Native alone (NH)	2	0	0.29%	0.00%
Asian alone (NH)	0	0	0.00%	0.00%
Pacific Islander alone (NH)	0	0	0.00%	0.00%
Some Other Race alone (NH)	0	0	0.00%	0.00%
Mixed Race or Multi-Racial (NH)	5	8	0.72%	1.34%
Hispanic or Latino (any race)	3	1	0.43%	0.17%
Total	692	595	100.00%	100.00%

== Education ==
Residents are in the Tunica County School District. Rosa Fort High School is the district's comprehensive high school.
