= Tunica County, Mississippi =

County in Mississippi, United States

- County
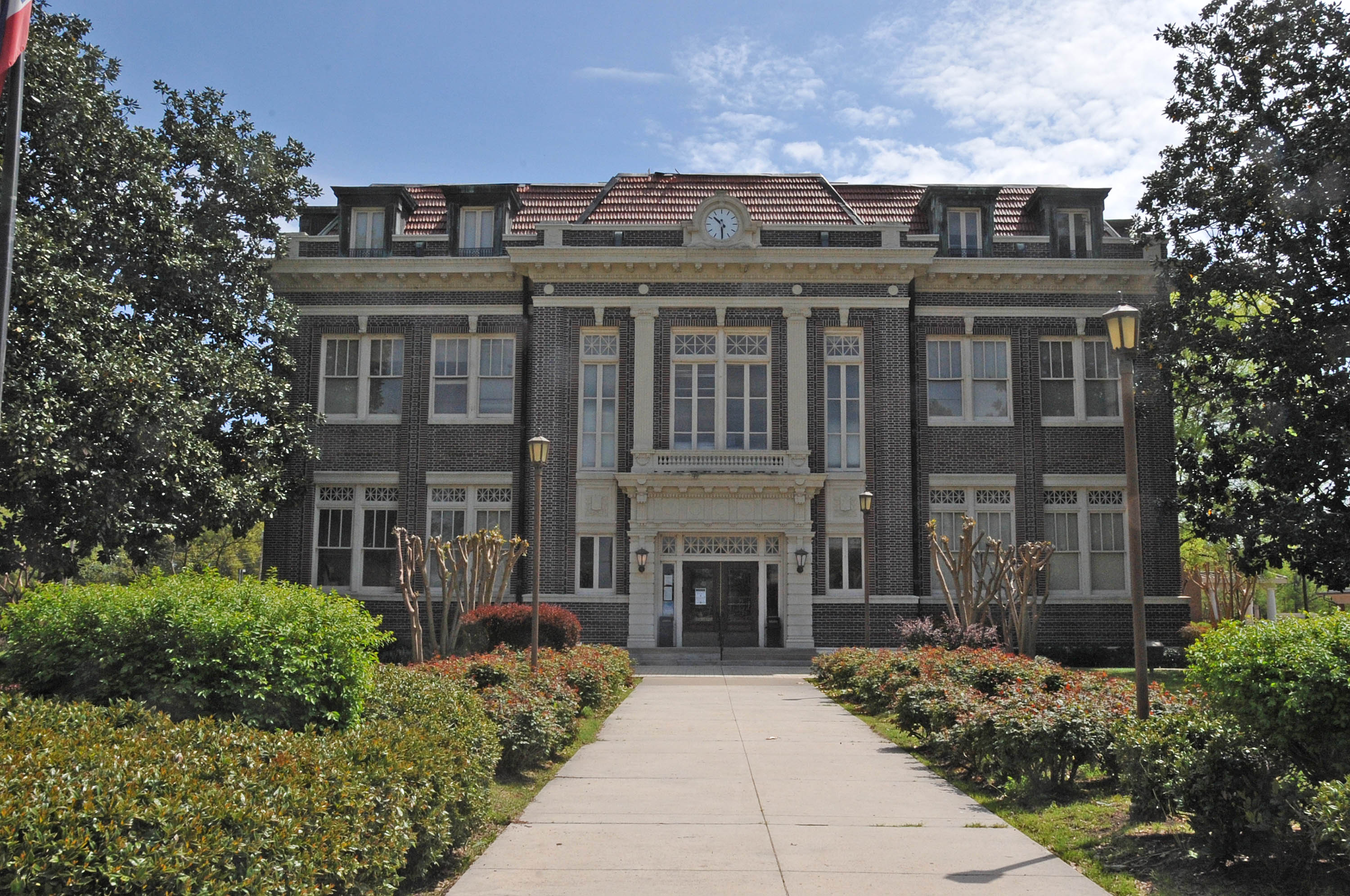
- Tunica County Courthouse in Tunica

- Location within the U.S. state of Mississippi
- Coordinates: 34°40′N 90°23′W
- Country: United States
- State: Mississippi
- Founded: 1836
- Named for: Tunica-Biloxi tribe
- Seat: Tunica
- Largest town: Tunica Resorts

Area
  - Total: 481 sq mi (1,250 km^{2})
  - Land: 455 sq mi (1,180 km^{2})
  - Water: 26 sq mi (67 km^{2}) 5.4%

Population (2020)
  - Total: 9,782
  - Estimate (2025): 8,819 ▼
  - Density: 21.5/sq mi (8.30/km^{2})
- Time zone: UTC−6 (Central)
  - Summer (DST): UTC−5 (CDT)
- Congressional district: 2nd
- Website: www.tunicacountymississippi.com

Tunica County is a county located in the U.S. state of Mississippi. As of the 2020 census, the population was 9,782. Its county seat is Tunica. The county is named for the Tunica Native Americans. Most migrated to central Louisiana during the colonial period.

Tunica County is part of the Memphis, TN-MS-AR Metropolitan Statistical Area. It is located in the Mississippi Delta region.

Since the late 20th century, it is known for Tunica Resorts (formerly Robinsonville), an unincorporated community that is the site of six casino resorts. It is one of the top six destinations in the country in terms of gambling revenues.

== History ==
After the Mississippi River flood of 1844, the state legislature gave the county taxation authority in 1848 to fund levee construction.

== Geography ==
According to the U.S. Census Bureau, the county has a total area of 481 square miles (1,250 km^{2}), of which 455 square miles (1,180 km^{2}) is land and 26 square miles (67 km^{2}) (5.4%) is water.

=== Major highways ===
- Interstate 69
- U.S. Route 61
- Mississippi Highway 3
- Mississippi Highway 4

=== Adjacent counties ===
- Crittenden County, Arkansas (north)
- DeSoto County (northeast)
- Tate County (east)
- Panola County (southeast)
- Quitman County (south)
- Coahoma County (southwest)
- Phillips County, Arkansas (southwest)
- Lee County, Arkansas (west)

== Demographics ==
Historical population
Census	Pop.	Note	%±
1840	821		—
1850	1,314		60.0%
1860	4,366		232.3%
1870	5,358		22.7%
1880	8,461		57.9%
1890	12,158		43.7%
1900	16,479		35.5%
1910	18,646		13.2%
1920	20,386		9.3%
1930	21,233		4.2%
1940	22,610		6.5%
1950	21,664		−4.2%
1960	16,826		−22.3%
1970	11,854		−29.5%
1980	9,652		−18.6%
1990	8,164		−15.4%
2000	9,227		13.0%
2010	10,778		16.8%
2020	9,782		−9.2%
2025 (est.)	8,819	▼	−9.8%
U.S. Decennial Census; 1790-1960 1900-1990; 1990-2000 2010-2013

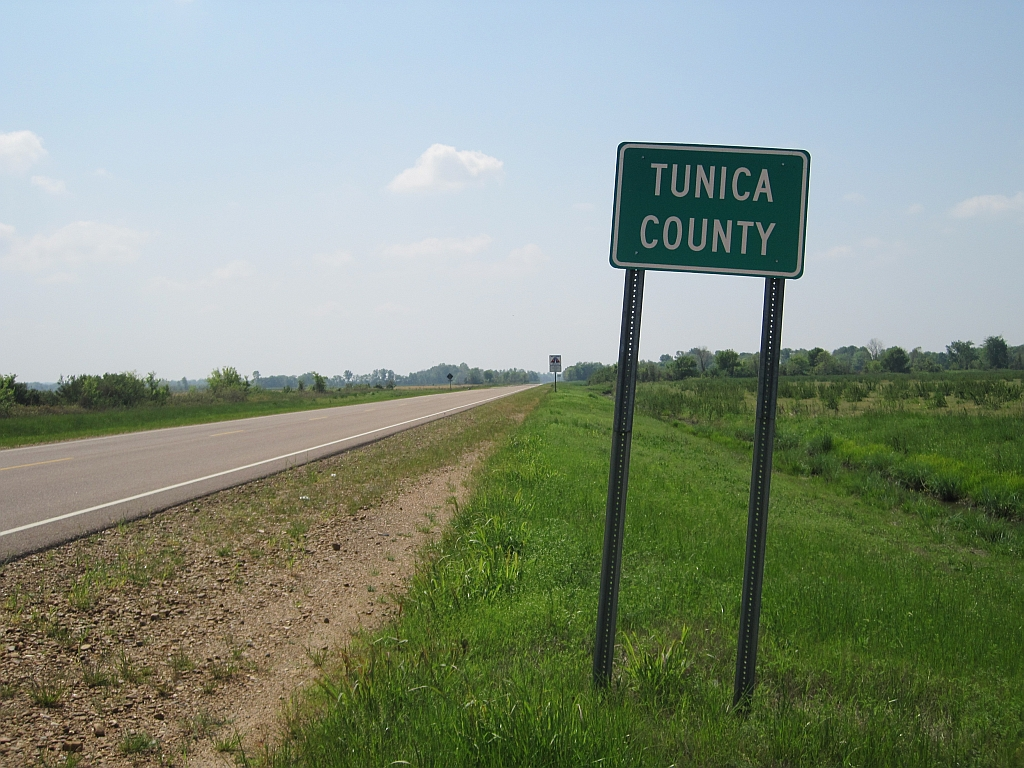
Sign when entering Tunica County

=== 2020 census ===
Tunica County, Mississippi – Racial and ethnic composition Note: the US Census treats Hispanic/Latino as an ethnic category. This table excludes Latinos from the racial categories and assigns them to a separate category. Hispanics/Latinos may be of any race.
Race / Ethnicity (NH = Non-Hispanic)	Pop 1980	Pop 1990	Pop 2000	Pop 2010	Pop 2020	% 1980	% 1990	% 2000	% 2010	% 2020
White alone (NH)	2,564	1,986	2,482	2,486	1,853	26.56%	24.33%	26.90%	23.07%	18.94%
Black or African American alone (NH)	6,967	6,089	6,414	7,894	7,516	72.18%	74.58%	69.51%	73.24%	76.84%
Native American or Alaska Native alone (NH)	5	2	9	14	13	0.05%	0.02%	0.10%	0.13%	0.13%
Asian alone (NH)	5	4	38	60	27	0.05%	0.05%	0.41%	0.56%	0.28%
Native Hawaiian or Pacific Islander alone (NH)	x	x	3	5	0	x	x	0.03%	0.05%	0.00%
Other race alone (NH)	4	2	3	2	56	0.04%	0.02%	0.03%	0.02%	0.57%
Mixed race or Multiracial (NH)	x	x	45	72	126	x	x	0.49%	0.67%	1.29%
Hispanic or Latino (any race)	107	81	233	245	191	1.11%	0.99%	2.53%	2.27%	1.95%
Total	9,652	8,164	9,227	10,778	9,782	100.00%	100.00%	100.00%	100.00%	100.00%

=== 2020 census ===
As of the 2020 census, the county had a population of 9,782. The median age was 35.3 years. 27.5% of residents were under the age of 18 and 13.4% of residents were 65 years of age or older. For every 100 females there were 89.8 males, and for every 100 females age 18 and over there were 84.6 males age 18 and over.

The racial makeup of the county was 19.1% White, 77.3% Black or African American, 0.1% American Indian and Alaska Native, 0.3% Asian, <0.1% Native Hawaiian and Pacific Islander, 1.5% from some other race, and 1.7% from two or more races. Hispanic or Latino residents of any race comprised 2.0% of the population.

<0.1% of residents lived in urban areas, while 100.0% lived in rural areas.

There were 3,817 households in the county, of which 35.1% had children under the age of 18 living in them. Of all households, 25.3% were married-couple households, 23.1% were households with a male householder and no spouse or partner present, and 41.9% were households with a female householder and no spouse or partner present. About 33.9% of all households were made up of individuals and 10.8% had someone living alone who was 65 years of age or older.

There were 4,575 housing units, of which 16.6% were vacant. Among occupied housing units, 39.8% were owner-occupied and 60.2% were renter-occupied. The homeowner vacancy rate was 0.5% and the rental vacancy rate was 16.5%.

=== 2010 census ===
As of the 2010 United States census, there were 10,778 people living in the county. 73.5% were Black or African American, 23.7% White, 0.6% Asian, 0.1% Native American, 0.1% Pacific Islander, 1.2% of some other race and 0.9% of two or more races. 2.3% were Hispanic or Latino (of any race).

=== 2000 census ===
As of the census of 2000, there were 9,227 people, 3,258 households, and 2,192 families living in the county. The population density was 20 people per square mile (7.7 people/km^{2}). There were 3,705 housing units at an average density of 8 units per square mile (3.1 units/km^{2}). The racial makeup of the county was 70.15% Black or African American, 27.54% White, 0.11% Native American, 0.42% Asian, 0.07% Pacific Islander, 0.96% from other races, and 0.75% from two or more races. 2.53% of the population were Hispanic or Latino of any race.

There were 3,258 households, out of which 33.30% had children under the age of 18 living with them, 33.90% were married couples living together, 26.90% had a female householder with no husband present, and 32.70% were non-families. 26.90% of all households were made up of individuals, and 9.90% had someone living alone who was 65 years of age or older. The average household size was 2.80 and the average family size was 3.44.

In the county, the population was spread out, with 31.50% under the age of 18, 10.90% from 18 to 24, 27.40% from 25 to 44, 20.20% from 45 to 64, and 10.10% who were 65 years of age or older. The median age was 31 years. For every 100 females there were 91.10 males. For every 100 females age 18 and over, there were 85.90 males.

The median income for a household in the county was $23,270, and the median income for a family was $25,443. Males had a median income of $25,244 versus $18,104 for females. The per capita income for the county was $11,978. About 28.10% of families and 33.10% of the population were below the poverty line, including 43.40% of those under age 18 and 32.50% of those age 65 or over.

== Economy ==
GreenTech Automotive received $6 million of incentive financing from the state of Mississippi and Tunica County to build an automotive plant in the county. The facility was shut down in January 2017. GreenTech had promised to invest $60 million in the manufacturing plant, but it produced few cars if any. A Mississippi state auditor's review begun in 2016 found documentation reflecting only $3 million spent by GreenTech on automotive assembly equipment and parts. While the company had promised to create 350 full-time jobs, it was found to never have created more than 94 active, full-time jobs in Mississippi at any time.

In July 2017, the Mississippi state auditor demanded that GreenTech and its CEO Charlie Wang pay Mississippi $6 million because Greentech had not lived up to its promises to invest $60 million and create 350 jobs in Tunica County. The auditor said: "I would venture that there isn’t really much of an operation in Tunica at all. This appears to have been a game of smoke and mirrors, and a corporate entity that never had any intention to deliver on the promises it made." In November 2017, Mississippi Attorney General Jim Hood sued the company for $3 million, plus forfeiture of land used for the Tunica factory.

GreenTech declared bankruptcy in February 2018. In a 2020 final settlement, it paid Mississippi and Tunica County only $575,000.

== Education ==
- Public School Districts
  - Tunica County School District (the school district for the entire county)
- Private Schools
  - Tunica Academy is located in an unincorporated area, near Tunica

== Notable people ==
- Brandon Bryant, National Football League (NFL) safety
- James Cotton, blues harmonica player
- Parker Hall, 1939 Most Valuable Player of the NFL
- Charlaine Harris, New York Times bestselling author
- Donald Hawkins, NFL tackle
- Benardrick McKinney, NFL linebacker for the New York Giants
- Tyree R. Rivers, US Army brigadier general, born in Tunica County

== Communities ==
=== Town ===
- Tunica (county seat)

=== Census-designated places ===
- Austin
- Dundee
- North Tunica
- Tunica Resorts (formerly known as Robinsonville)
- White Oak

=== Unincorporated communities ===
- Banks
- Bowdre
- Clack
- Clayton
- Dubbs
- Evansville
- Hollywood
- Lost Lake
- Maud
- Mhoon Landing
- Prichard

=== Ghost towns ===
- Commerce
- Harbert Landing
- Penton
- Pink
- Trotter Landing

== Politics ==
Tunica County is a Democratic stronghold, like other Mississippi Delta counties. The last Republican to carry the county was Richard Nixon in 1972.

United States presidential election results for Tunica County, Mississippi
Year	Republican		Democratic		Third party(ies)	
Year	No.	%	No.	%	No.	%
1912	1	0.52%	188	97.41%	4	2.07%
1916	0	0.00%	173	100.00%	0	0.00%
1920	2	0.77%	256	98.84%	1	0.39%
1924	13	2.56%	495	97.44%	0	0.00%
1928	26	3.82%	654	96.18%	0	0.00%
1932	8	1.38%	573	98.62%	0	0.00%
1936	5	0.71%	701	99.29%	0	0.00%
1940	13	1.61%	795	98.39%	0	0.00%
1944	35	4.63%	721	95.37%	0	0.00%
1948	12	1.60%	23	3.07%	715	95.33%
1952	383	41.95%	530	58.05%	0	0.00%
1956	200	23.92%	470	56.22%	166	19.86%
1960	334	37.24%	323	36.01%	240	26.76%
1964	945	90.52%	99	9.48%	0	0.00%
1968	413	17.73%	1,133	48.65%	783	33.62%
1972	1,446	62.19%	858	36.90%	21	0.90%
1976	951	34.51%	1,695	61.50%	110	3.99%
1980	954	29.77%	2,198	68.58%	53	1.65%
1984	1,109	39.55%	1,621	57.81%	74	2.64%
1988	896	36.87%	1,510	62.14%	24	0.99%
1992	693	30.90%	1,451	64.69%	99	4.41%
1996	557	29.53%	1,263	66.97%	66	3.50%
2000	792	33.47%	1,539	65.05%	35	1.48%
2004	950	30.36%	2,140	68.39%	39	1.25%
2008	1,017	23.48%	3,279	75.69%	36	0.83%
2012	883	20.15%	3,475	79.30%	24	0.55%
2016	853	23.91%	2,667	74.77%	47	1.32%
2020	926	26.00%	2,580	72.43%	56	1.57%
2024	799	29.95%	1,837	68.85%	32	1.20%

== See also ==
National Register of Historic Places listings in Tunica County, Mississippi
