= List of high schools in Mississippi =

List of Mississippi high schools

This is a list of high schools in the state of Mississippi.

== Adams County ==
- Adams County Christian School, Natchez
- Cathedral High School, Natchez
- Natchez High School, Natchez

== Alcorn County ==
- Alcorn Central High School, Glen
- Biggersville High School, Corinth
- Corinth High School, Corinth
- Kossuth High School, Kossuth

== Amite County ==
- Amite County High School, Liberty
- Amite Vocational/Technical Complex, Liberty
- Amite School Center (private)

== Attala County ==
- Ethel High School, Ethel
- Kosciusko High School, Kosciusko
- Old Dominion Christian School, Kosciusko

== Benton County ==
- Ashland Middle/High School, Ashland
- Hickory Flat Attendance Center, Hickory Flat

== Bolivar County ==
- Bayou Academy, Cleveland
- Northside High School (former Broad Street High School), Shelby
- Cleveland Central High School (former Cleveland High School), Cleveland
- Shaw High School (previously McEvans Warriors K-12 School), Shaw
- West Bolivar High School, Rosedale

== Calhoun County ==
- Bruce High School, Bruce
- Calhoun Academy, Calhoun City
- Calhoun City High School, Calhoun City
- Vardaman High School, Vardaman

== Carroll County ==
- Carroll Academy, Carrollton
- J. Z. George High School, North Carrollton

== Chickasaw County ==
- Houlka Attendance Center High School, Houlka
- Houston High School, Houston
- Houston Vocational/Technical Education Center, Houston
- Okolona High School, Okolona

== Choctaw County ==
- Choctaw County High School, Ackerman (formerly Ackerman HS)
- French Camp Academy, French Camp

== Claiborne County ==
- Port Gibson High School, Port Gibson

== Clarke County ==
- Enterprise High School, Enterprise
- Quitman High School, Quitman

== Clay County ==
- Hebron Christian School, Pheba
- Oak Hill Academy, West Point
- West Point High School, West Point

== Coahoma County ==
- Clarksdale High School, Clarksdale
- Coahoma Agricultural High School, Clarksdale
- Coahoma County High School, Clarksdale
- Lee Academy, Clarksdale

== Copiah County ==
- Copiah Academy, Gallman
- Crystal Springs High School, Crystal Springs
- Hazlehurst High School, Hazlehurst
- Wesson Attendance Center, Wesson

== Covington County ==
- Collins High School, Collins
- Mount Olive High School, Mount Olive
- Seminary High School, Seminary

== DeSoto County ==
- Center Hill High School, Olive Branch
- DeSoto Central High School, Southaven
- Hernando High School, Hernando
- Horn Lake High School, Horn Lake
- Lake Cormorant High School, Lake Cormorant
- Lewisburg High School, Olive Branch
- Olive Branch High School, Olive Branch
- Southaven High School, Southaven

== Forrest County ==
- Forrest County Agricultural High School, Brooklyn
- North Forrest High School, Hattiesburg
- Hattiesburg High School, Hattiesburg
- Petal High School, Petal
- Presbyterian Christian School, Hattiesburg
- Sacred Heart High School, Hattiesburg

== Franklin County ==
- Franklin County High School, Meadville

== George County ==
- George County High School, Lucedale

== Greene County ==
- Greene County High School, Leakesville

== Grenada County ==
- Grenada High School, Grenada
- Kirk Academy, Grenada

== Hancock County ==
- Bay High School, Bay St. Louis
- Hancock High School, Kiln
- Our Lady Academy, Bay St. Louis
- Saint Stanislaus College, Bay St. Louis

== Harrison County ==
- Biloxi High School, Biloxi
- Christian Collegiate Academy, Gulfport
- D'Iberville High School, D'Iberville
- Gulfport High School, Gulfport
- Harrison Central High School, Gulfport
- Long Beach Senior High School, Long Beach
- Pass Christian High School, Pass Christian
- St. Patrick Catholic High School, Biloxi
- Temple Christian Academy, Gulfport
- West Harrison High School, Gulfport

== Hinds County ==
- Hinds County Agricultural High School, Utica
- Rebul Academy, Learned
- Terry High School, Terry

=== Clinton ===
- Clinton Christian Academy
- Clinton High School
- Mount Salus Christian School

=== Jackson ===
- Callaway High School
- Capital City Alternative School
- Forest Hill High School
- Hillcrest Christian School
- Jackson Academy
- Jim Hill High School
- Lanier High School
- Mississippi School for the Blind
- Mississippi School for the Deaf
- Murrah High School
- Provine High School
- Wingfield High School

=== Raymond ===
- Central Hinds Academy
- Raymond High School

== Holmes County ==
- Central Holmes Christian School, Lexington
- Holmes County Central High School, Lexington

== Humphreys County ==
- Humphreys Academy, Belzoni
- Humphreys County High School, Belzoni

== Issaquena County ==
- none

== Itawamba County ==
- Itawamba Agricultural High School, Fulton
- Mantachie Attendance Center, Mantachie
- Tremont Attendance Center, Tremont

== Jackson County ==
- East Central High School, Hurley
- Gautier High School, Gautier
- Mississippi Division of Independent Study, Ocean Springs
- Moss Point High School, Moss Point
- Ocean Springs High School, Ocean Springs
- Pascagoula High School, Pascagoula
- Resurrection Catholic School, Pascagoula
- St. Martin High School, Ocean Springs
- Vancleave High School, Vancleave
- Trent Lott Academy, Pascagoula

== Jasper County ==
- Bay Springs High School, Bay Springs
- Heidelberg High School, Heidelberg
- Stringer Attendance Center, Stringer
- Sylva Bay Academy, Bay Springs

== Jefferson County ==
- Jefferson County High School, Fayette

== Jefferson Davis County ==
- Prentiss Christian School, Prentiss
- Jefferson Davis County High School, Bassfield

== Jones County ==
- Laurel Christian High School, Laurel
- Laurel High School, Laurel
- Northeast Jones High School, Laurel
- South Jones High School, Ellisville
- West Jones High School, Laurel

== Kemper County ==
- Kemper County High School, DeKalb

== Lafayette County ==
- Lafayette High School, Oxford
- Oxford High School, Oxford
- University of Mississippi High School, Oxford

== Lamar County ==
- Bass Memorial Academy, Lumberton
- Lamar Christian School, Purvis
- Lumberton High School, Lumberton
- Oak Grove High School, Oak Grove
- Purvis High School, Purvis
- Sumrall Middle/High School, Sumrall

== Lauderdale County ==
- Clarkdale Attendance Center, Meridian
- Lamar School, Meridian
- Meridian High School, Meridian
- Northeast Lauderdale High School, Meridian
- Southeast Lauderdale High School, Meridian
- West Lauderdale High School, Collinsville
- Russell Christian School, Meridian

== Lawrence County ==
- Lawrence County High School, Monticello

== Leake County ==
- Leake Academy, Madden
- Leake Central High School, Carthage (formerly Carthage High School)
- Leake County High School, Walnut Grove (formerly South Leake High School)

== Lee County ==
- Baldwyn High School, Baldwyn
- Faith Christian School, Guntown
- Mooreville High School, Mooreville
- Nettleton High School, Nettleton
- Saltillo High School, Saltillo
- Shannon High School, Shannon
- Tupelo Christian Academy, Tupelo
- Tupelo Christian Preparatory School, Belden
- Tupelo High School, Tupelo

== LeFlore County ==
- Amanda Elzy High School, Greenwood
- Delta Streets Academy, Greenwood
- Greenwood High School, Greenwood
- Leflore County High School, Itta Bena
- Pillow Academy, Greenwood

== Lincoln County ==
- Bogue Chitto Attendance Center, Bogue Chitto
- Brookhaven Academy, Brookhaven
- Brookhaven High School, Brookhaven
- Enterprise Attendance Center, Brookhaven
- Loyd Star Attendance Center, Brookhaven
- Mississippi School of the Arts, Brookhaven
- West Lincoln Attendance Center, Brookhaven

== Lowndes County ==
- Caledonia High School, Caledonia
- Columbus High School, Columbus
- Heritage Academy, Columbus
- Columbus Christian Academy, Steens
- Mississippi School for Mathematics and Science, Columbus
- New Hope High School, Columbus
- Victory Christian Academy, Columbus
- West Lowndes High School, Columbus

== Madison County ==
- Canton Academy, Canton
- Canton High School, Canton
- Germantown High School, Madison
- Madison Central High School, Madison
- Madison-Ridgeland Academy, Madison
- Ridgeland High School, Ridgeland
- St. Andrew's Episcopal School, Ridgeland
- St. Joseph Catholic School, Madison
- Tri-County Academy, Flora
- Velma Jackson High School, Camden

== Marion County ==
- Columbia Academy, Columbia
- Columbia High School, Columbia
- East Marion High School, Columbia
- West Marion High School, Foxworth

== Marshall County ==
- Bethlehem Christian School, Potts Camp
- Byers High School, Holly Springs
- Byhalia High School, Byhalia
- Holly Springs High School, Holly Springs
- Marshall Academy, Holly Springs
- Potts Camp High School, Potts Camp

== Monroe County ==
- Aberdeen High School, Aberdeen
- Amory Christian Academy, Amory
- Amory High School, Amory
- Hamilton School, Hamilton
- Hatley School, Hatley
- Smithville School, Smithville

== Montgomery County ==
- Winona Christian School, Winona
- Winona Secondary School, Winona

== Neshoba County ==
- Neshoba Central High School, Philadelphia
- Philadelphia High School, Philadelphia

== Newton County ==
- Newton Career Center, Newton
- Newton County Academy, Decatur
- Newton County High School, Decatur
- Newton High School, Newton
- Union High School, Union

== Noxubee County ==
- Noxubee County High School, Macon

== Oktibbeha County ==
- Starkville Academy, Starkville
- Starkville High School, Starkville

== Panola County ==
- North Delta High School, Batesville
- North Panola High School, Sardis
- Pope School, Pope
- South Panola High School, Batesville

== Pearl River County ==
- Pearl River Central High School, Carriere
- Picayune Memorial High School, Picayune
- Poplarville High School, Poplarville

== Perry County ==
- Perry Central High School, New Augusta
- Richton High School, Richton

== Pike County ==
- McComb High School, McComb
- North Pike Career & Technical Center, Summit
- North Pike Senior High School, Summit
- Parklane Academy, McComb
- South Pike High School, Magnolia
- South Pike Vocational Center, Magnolia

== Pontotoc County ==
- North Pontotoc High School, Ecru
- Pontotoc High School, Pontotoc
- South Pontotoc High School, Pontotoc

== Prentiss County ==
- Booneville High School, Booneville
- Jumpertown School, Booneville
- New Site High School, New Site
- Thrasher School, Booneville
- Wheeler School, Wheeler

== Quitman County ==
- Delta Academy, Marks
- Madison Palmer High School, Marks

== Rankin County ==
- Brandon High School, Brandon
- Discovery Christian School, Florence
- East Rankin Academy, Pelahatchie
- Florence High School, Florence
- Jackson Preparatory School, Flowood
- McLaurin Attendance Center, Star
- Northwest Rankin High School, Flowood
- Pearl High School, Pearl
- Pelahatchie Attendance Center, Pelahatchie
- Piney Woods Country Life School, Piney Woods
- Pisgah High School, Sandhill
- Puckett Attendance Center, Puckett
- Rankin Academy, Star (1971 - 1996)
- Richland High School, Richland
- Star School, Star (Circa 1923-1950)
- Hartfield Academy, Flowood (formerly University Christian School)

== Scott County ==
- Forest High School, Forest
- Lake High School, Lake
- Morton High School, Morton
- Scott Central Attendance Center, Forest
- Sebastopol Attendance Center, Sebastopol

== Sharkey County ==
- Sharkey-Issaquena Academy, Rolling Fork
- South Delta High School, Rolling Fork

== Simpson County ==
- Magee High School, Magee
- Mendenhall High School, Mendenhall
- Simpson County Academy, Mendenhall

== Smith County ==
- Mize Attendance Center, Mize
- Raleigh High School, Raleigh
- Smith County Career Center, Raleigh
- Taylorsville Attendance Center, Taylorsville

== Stone County ==
- Stone High School, Wiggins
- Gateway Christian Academy, Wiggins

== Sunflower County ==
- Drew High School, Drew
- Gentry High School, Indianola
- Indianola Academy, Indianola
- North Sunflower Academy, Drew
- Thomas E. Edwards, Sr. High School, Ruleville

== Tallahatchie County ==
- Charleston High School, Charleston
- West Tallahatchie High School, Webb

== Tate County ==
- Coldwater Attendance Center, Coldwater
- Independence High School, Independence
- Magnolia Heights School, Senatobia
- Senatobia Junior Senior High School, Senatobia
- Strayhorn High School, Sarah

== Tippah County ==
- Blue Mountain School, Blue Mountain
- Falkner High School, Falkner
- Pine Grove School, Pine Grove
- Ripley High School, Ripley
- Walnut Attendance Center, Walnut

== Tishomingo County ==
- Belmont School, Belmont
- Tishomingo County High School, Iuka

== Tunica County ==
- Rosa Fort High School, Tunica
- Tunica Academy, Tunica

== Union County ==
- East Union Attendance Center, Blue Springs
- Ingomar Attendance Center, New Albany
- New Albany High School, New Albany
- Myrtle Attendance Center, Myrtle
- Victory Christian Academy, New Albany
- West Union Attendance Center, Myrtle

== Walthall County ==
- Salem Attendance Center, Tylertown
- Tylertown High School, Tylertown

== Warren County ==
- Porter's Chapel Academy, Vicksburg
- St. Aloysius High School, Vicksburg
- Vicksburg High School, Vicksburg
- Warren Central High School, Vicksburg

== Washington County ==
- Deer Creek School, Arcola
- Greenville Christian School, Greenville
- Greenville Technical Center, Greenville
- Greenville Weston High School, Greenville
- King's Court Christian Academy, Greenville
- Leland High School, Leland
- O'Bannon High School, Greenville
- Riverside High School, Avon
- Saint Joseph High School, Greenville
- Simmons High School, Hollandale
- Washington School, Greenville

== Wayne County ==
- Wayne Academy, Waynesboro
- Wayne County High School, Waynesboro

== Webster County ==
- East Webster High School, Maben
- Eupora High School, Eupora

== Wilkinson County ==
- Centreville Academy, Centreville
- Wilkinson County Christian Academy, Woodville
- Wilkinson County High School, Woodville

== Winston County ==
- Grace Christian School, Louisville
- Louisville High School, Louisville
- Nanih Waiya School, Louisville
- Noxapater School, Noxapater
- Winston Academy, Louisville

== Yalobusha County ==
- Coffeeville High School, Coffeeville
- Water Valley High School, Water Valley

== Yazoo County ==
- Benton Academy, Benton
- Manchester Academy, Yazoo City
- Yazoo City High School, Yazoo City
- Yazoo County High School, Yazoo City

== Defunct schools ==
- Trinity Episcopal Day School, Natchez (closed 2018)
- The Veritas School, Ridgeland (closed 2015)
- All Saints' Episcopal School, Vicksburg (closed)

== See also ==
- List of school districts in Mississippi
- List of private schools in Mississippi
