= Arkabutla, Mississippi =

- Census-designated place
- Location within Mississippi Location within the United States
- Coordinates: 34°42′00″N 90°07′32″W
- Country: United States
- State: Mississippi
- County: Tate

Area
  - Total: 4.03 sq mi (10.45 km^{2})
  - Land: 4.03 sq mi (10.45 km^{2})
  - Water: 0 sq mi (0.00 km^{2})
- Elevation: 282 ft (86 m)

Population (2020)
  - Total: 285
  - Density: 70.7/sq mi (27.29/km^{2})
- Time zone: UTC-6 (Central (CST))
  - Summer (DST): UTC-5 (CDT)
- ZIP code: 38602
- Area code: 662
- GNIS feature ID: 2806379

Arkabutla is a census-designated place (CDP) and unincorporated community in Tate County, Mississippi, United States. Arkabutla is located approximately 9 miles (14 km) west of Coldwater and approximately 9 miles (14 km) north of Strayhorn. It also lies approximately 4 miles (6.4 km) south of the dam at Arkabutla Lake. Although an unincorporated community, it has a post office and a zip code of 38602.

The community derives its name from Arkabutla Creek.

Per the 2020 Census, the population was 285.

== History ==
=== 2023 shooting spree ===
On February 17, 2023, six people were killed and a seventh person injured in a shooting spree at three homes and a convenience store in Arkabutla. The sole suspect, identified as 52-year-old Richard Dale Crum, was arrested by police at one of the homes, and he was charged with first-degree murder. One of the deceased victims was Crum's ex-wife.

== Demographics ==
Historical population
Census	Pop.	Note	%±
2020	285		—
U.S. Decennial Census; 2020

Arkabutla first appeared as a census designated place in the 2020 U.S. census.

Arkabutla CDP, Mississippi – Racial and ethnic composition Note: the US Census treats Hispanic/Latino as an ethnic category. This table excludes Latinos from the racial categories and assigns them to a separate category. Hispanics/Latinos may be of any race.
Race / Ethnicity (NH = Non-Hispanic)	Pop 2020	% 2020
White alone (NH)	237	83.16%
Black or African American alone (NH)	27	9.47%
Native American or Alaska Native alone (NH)	2	0.70%
Asian alone (NH)	0	0.00%
Native Hawaiian or Pacific Islander alone (NH)	0	0.00%
Other race alone (NH)	1	0.35%
Mixed race or Multiracial (NH)	13	4.56%
Hispanic or Latino (any race)	5	1.75%
Total	285	100.00%

== Education ==
It is in the Tate County School District.

== Notable people ==
- James Earl Jones (1931–2024), actor
- Matthew Maher (1971 or 72), actor
