= Damion Willis =

American football player (born 1997)

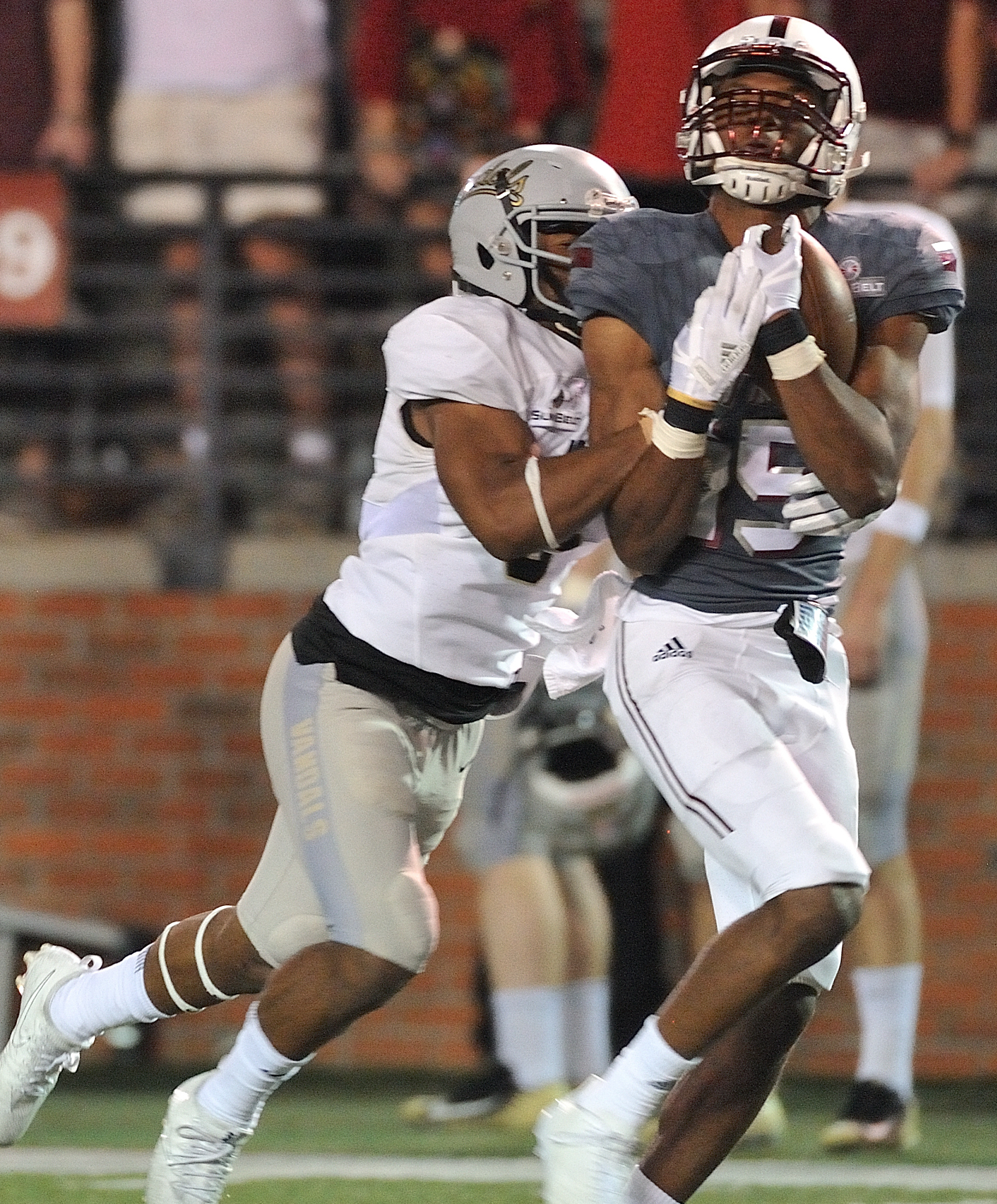
- Willis with Troy in 2017

Georgia Southern Eagles
- Title: Inside receivers coach

Personal information
- Born: June 20, 1997 (age 29); Jackson, Mississippi, U.S.
- Listed height: 6 ft 3 in (1.91 m)
- Listed weight: 204 lb (93 kg)

Career information
- High school: Southeast Lauderdale (Meridian, Mississippi)
- College: Troy
- NFL draft: 2019: undrafted

Career history

Playing
- Cincinnati Bengals (2019); Cleveland Browns (2020)*; Jacksonville Jaguars (2020)*; Denver Broncos (2021)*; New York Giants (2021)*; Washington Football Team (2021)*; Pittsburgh Steelers (2021)*; Seattle Sea Dragons (2023); Memphis Showboats (2024)*
- * Offseason or practice squad member only

Coaching
- Holmes Community College (2022–2023) Wide receivers coach; Georgia Southern (2024) Graduate assistant; Georgia Southern (2025–present) Inside receivers coach

Awards and highlights
- First-team All-Sun Belt (2018)

Career NFL statistics
- Receptions: 9
- Receiving yards: 82
- Stats at Pro Football Reference

Damion Lakeith Willis (born June 20, 1997) is an American former professional football wide receiver who is an inside receivers coach for the Georgia Southern Eagles. He played college football for the Troy Trojans and signed with the Cincinnati Bengals as an undrafted free agent in 2019.

== Early life ==
Willis was born in Jackson, Mississippi, and moved to Meridian, Mississippi, at the age of 2. He was raised by a single mother who worked as a hospice nurse. Willis attended and played football at Southeast Lauderdale High School. He registered at least 1,000 receiving yards in each of his final three seasons playing for the Tigers. As a senior, Willis had 48 catches with 1,154 yards receiving and 17 touchdowns and was named First-team MHSAA 3A All-State. Southeast Lauderdale retired his number in 2019.

== College career ==
Despite receiving offers from Louisiana Tech and Louisiana-Monroe, Willis opted to begin collegiate career at East Mississippi Community College, playing sparingly in his freshman year. As a sophomore, he led the Lions with 620 receiving yards and 18.2 yards per catch while finishing second on the team with six touchdown receptions and third with 34 catches. Willis transferred to Troy University, which had recruited him out of high school, for the remaining two seasons of his eligibility.

In his first season with the Trojans, Willis started eight games and finished the season with 42 receptions for 620 yards and three touchdowns and was named honorable mention All-Sun Belt Conference. He caught a New Orleans Bowl record 11 passes for 136 yards and two touchdowns against North Texas. Willis was named first-team All-Sun Belt as a senior after catching 56 passes for 876 yards and a conference-best 10 touchdowns, despite missing two and a half games due to injury.

== Professional career ==
=== Cincinnati Bengals ===
Willis signed with the Cincinnati Bengals as an undrafted free agent on April 28, 2019. He made his NFL debut on September 8, 2019, against the Seattle Seahawks, starting in place of injured receiver A. J. Green and making three receptions for 30 yards. He was waived October 23, 2019, and re-signed to the practice squad the next day. The Bengals promoted Willis back up to the active roster on November 15, 2019. On December 3, 2019, Willis was waived by the Bengals and re-signed to the practice squad. He was promoted back to the active roster on December 10, 2019. Willis finished his rookie season with nine receptions for 82 yards in ten games played (two starts).

Willis was placed on the active/physically unable to perform list at the start of training camp on July 29, 2020, and activated from the list five days later. Willis was waived on August 25, 2020.

=== Cleveland Browns ===
Willis was claimed off waivers by the Cleveland Browns on August 26, 2020. He was waived four days later with a failed physical designation.

=== Jacksonville Jaguars ===
On December 7, 2020, Willis signed with the practice squad of the Jacksonville Jaguars. His practice squad contract with the team expired after the season on January 11, 2021.

=== Denver Broncos ===
On May 18, 2021, Willis signed with the Denver Broncos. He was waived on July 20, 2021.

=== New York Giants ===
On July 31, 2021, Willis signed with the New York Giants. He was waived on August 31, 2021 and re-signed to the practice squad the next day. He was released on September 3.

=== Washington Football Team ===
Willis signed with the Washington Football Team's practice squad on October 5, 2021. He was released on November 23, 2021.

=== Pittsburgh Steelers ===
On December 28, 2021, Willis was signed by the Pittsburgh Steelers to their practice squad. He was released on January 7, 2022.

=== Seattle Sea Dragons ===
On November 17, 2022, Willis was selected by the Seattle Sea Dragons of the XFL. The Sea Dragons folded when the XFL and USFL merged to create the United Football League (UFL).

=== Memphis Showboats ===
On January 15, 2024, Willis was selected by the Memphis Showboats in the eighth round of the Super Draft portion of the 2024 UFL dispersal draft. He was released on January 30, 2024.
