= Torrin Tucker =

American gridiron football player (born 1979)

No. 77, 73
- Position: Offensive tackle

Personal information
- Born: December 25, 1979 (age 46); Meridian, Mississippi, U.S.
- Listed height: 6 ft 6 in (1.98 m)
- Listed weight: 315 lb (143 kg)

Career information
- High school: Southeast Lauderdale (Meridian)
- College: Southern Miss
- NFL draft: 2003: undrafted

Career history
- Dallas Cowboys (2003–2005); Tampa Bay Buccaneers (2006)*; Oakland Raiders (2007)*; New York Dragons (2008); Edmonton Eskimos (2008)*; Houston Texans (2008)*; Florida Tuskers (2010); Sacramento Mountain Lions (2011)
- * Offseason or practice squad member only

Awards and highlights
- Conference USA All-Freshman (1999); All-C-USA (2002)

Career NFL statistics
- Games played: 36
- Games started: 24
- Fumble recoveries: 1
- Stats at Pro Football Reference

Torrin Tucker (born December 25, 1979) is an American former professional football player who was an offensive tackle for the Dallas Cowboys of the National Football League. He played college football for the Southern Miss Golden Eagles.

== Early life ==
Tucker attended Southeast Lauderdale High School. As a senior defensive tackle, he posted 87 tackles, while scoring touchdowns on a fumble return and a blocked punt. He received All-district 7-2A, Most Valuable Defensive Lineman in the district and second-team All-state honors.

He accepted a football scholarship from the University of Southern Mississippi. As a redshirt freshman, he started in 5 out of 9 games. As a sophomore he started every game, playing at both right tackle and left guard. As a junior and senior, he started every game at right guard. He made the Dean's List in his last two years.

== Professional career ==
Pre-draft measurables
Height	Weight	Arm length	Hand span	40-yard dash	10-yard split	20-yard split	20-yard shuttle	Vertical jump
6 ft 5 3/4 in (1.97 m)	328 lb (149 kg)	34 1/2 in (0.88 m)	10 1/4 in (0.26 m)	5.43 s	1.91 s	3.13 s	4.96 s	30.0 in (0.76 m)
All values from NFL Combine

=== Dallas Cowboys ===
Despite being ranked by different publications as one of the top guard prospects available in the 2003 NFL draft, Tucker was not selected and had to sign as an undrafted free agent with the Dallas Cowboys. After being waived on August 31, he was signed to the practice squad on September 30. On October 1, he was promoted to the active roster.

As a rookie, he was switched to offensive tackle and would play as the "swing" tackle, backing up the left and right tackle positions, while appearing in seven games (one start) and being declared inactive in 6 contests. In 2004, he started 13 games at right tackle after passing Kurt Vollers on the depth chart. He was declared inactive in the final 3 contests, as Vollers regained his starting position.

Entering the 2005 season, he was expected to compete for the starting right tackle role, but struggled after coming in to camp overweight and lost the position to rookie Rob Petitti. He became the starter at left tackle after the sixth game of the season, when Flozell Adams was lost after tearing his ACL.

In the 2006 offseason, he was as a restricted free agent and the Tampa Bay Buccaneers signed him to a two-year offer sheet, that included a $100,000 signing bonus, a $1.2 million and $1.1 million base salaries, along with a $200,000 roster bonus if he was on the team in 2007. The Cowboys eventually decided not to match the offer and lost Tucker without receiving any compensation.

=== Tampa Bay Buccaneers ===
The Tampa Bay Buccaneers were looking for Tucker to earn the left tackle starting role over Anthony Davis, but an arthritic knee forced him to miss nearly all of training camp. He was placed on the injured reserve list on September 2, 2006, only to be waived from the team 6 days later in a salary cap move, having never played a game with the Buccaneers.

=== Oakland Raiders ===
On August 17, 2007, he was signed as a free agent by the Oakland Raiders. He was cut on August 28.

=== New York Dragons ===
On November 21, 2007, he signed with the New York Dragons of the Arena Football League. He was waived on April 24, 2008.

=== Edmonton Eskimos ===
In 2008, he signed with the Edmonton Eskimos of the Canadian Football League. He was cut before the start of the season on June 17.

=== Houston Texans ===
On August 8, 2008, he signed with the Houston Texans as a free agent. He was released on August 29.

=== Florida Tuskers ===
In 2010, he was signed by the Florida Tuskers of the United Football League, who were coached by Jay Gruden. He played 6 games during the season.

=== Sacramento Mountain Lions ===
In May 2011, he signed with the Sacramento Mountain Lions of the United Football League, reuniting with Gruden. He played 4 games during the season.

== Personal life ==
Tucker's character has been often defined as passionate and strong willed. He can be accounted for performing multiple community service acts including volunteering at youth football camps and participating in passing out Christmas turkeys. He also assisted in sending over 70 kids to college through his AAU basketball team.
