= Cottonville =

Cottonville may refer to:

== Places ==
Australia

- Cottonville, South Australia, the name given to a former part of the Adelaide suburb of Westbourne Park, South Australia

United States

- Cottonville, Alabama
- Cottonville, Iowa
- Cottonville, Mississippi
- Cottonville, North Carolina
- Cottonville, Wisconsin
