= Kendall Simmons =

American football player (born 1979)

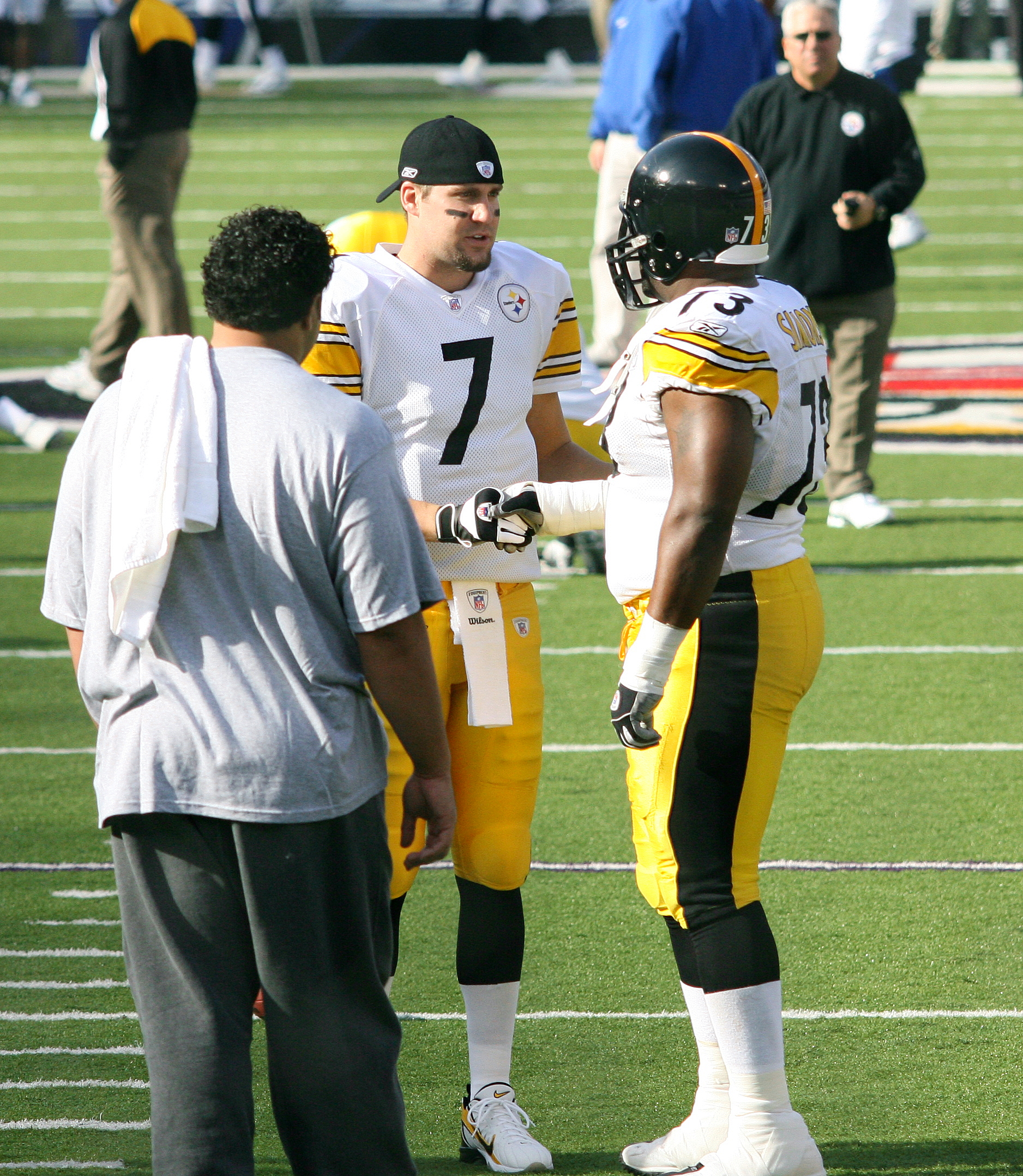
- Simmons (right) talks with Ben Roethlisberger prior to a game in 2006

Personal information
- Born: March 11, 1979 (age 47); Ripley, Mississippi, U.S.
- Listed height: 6 ft 3 in (1.91 m)
- Listed weight: 315 lb (143 kg)

Career information
- High school: Ripley (MS)
- College: Auburn (1997–2001)
- NFL draft: 2002: 1st round, 30th overall pick

Career history

Playing
- Pittsburgh Steelers (2002–2008); New England Patriots (2009); Buffalo Bills (2009)

Coaching
- Auburn (2019–2023) Offensive analyst; Auburn (2022) Interim offensive line coach; Middle Tennessee (2024–2025) Offensive line coach

Awards and highlights
- 2× Super Bowl champion (XL, XLIII); PFWA All-Rookie Team (2002); Third-team All-American (2000); Jacobs Blocking Trophy (2001); First-team All-SEC (2001)

Career NFL statistics
- Games played: 84
- Games started: 83
- Stats at Pro Football Reference

Henry Alexander Kendall Simmons (born March 11, 1979) is an American football coach and former guard in the National Football League (NFL). He was selected by the Pittsburgh Steelers in the first round of the 2002 NFL draft. He played college football for the Auburn Tigers. Simmons was also a member of the New England Patriots and Buffalo Bills.

== Early life ==
Simmons grew up in Ripley, Mississippi. He was a three-year starter at Ripley (Miss.) High, where he was named an All-State and PrepStar All-America selection as a senior defensive lineman after a season when he recorded 70 tackles and four sacks, forced five fumbles and returned one for a touchdown. Simmons was named District Defensive Most Valuable Player and was voted Clarion-Ledger "Top 10" and No. 2 offensive line prospect in Mississippi. He was a Commercial Appeal "Mid-South Top 100" and was chosen to play in the Alabama-Mississippi All-Star Game. He also played baseball and basketball.

== Professional career ==
=== Pittsburgh Steelers ===
Before the 2003 season, Simmons was diagnosed with type 1 diabetes.

Simmons was a starter during the first two years of his career. After being injured for the entirety of the 2004 season, he returned in 2005, starting in all 20 regular and postseason games and winning Super Bowl XL with the Steelers.

Simmons experienced an off-the-field injury during the 2006 NFL season. While rehabilitating from a heel injury, Simmons suffered a frostbite-like burn to his left foot after he fell asleep with a cooling device attached to his foot.

On September 3, 2007, Simmons signed a four-year extension with the Steelers, keeping him with the club through the 2010 NFL season.

Simmons suffered a season-ending injury to his Achilles tendon during a Monday Night Football contest against the Baltimore Ravens on September 29, 2008. He was subsequently placed on injured reserve.

He was released by the Steelers on February 26, 2009.

=== New England Patriots ===
Simmons signed a three-year contract with the New England Patriots on September 6, 2009, and was released on November 6, 2009.

=== Buffalo Bills ===
Simmons was signed by the Buffalo Bills on November 24, 2009. On December 18, Simmons was placed on Injured Reserve due to a shoulder injury. He announced his retirement from football in 2011, and now lives in Auburn.
