= List of school districts in Mississippi =

This is a list of school districts in Mississippi.

School districts which are independent governments as per the U.S. Census Bureau include county-wide school districts, consolidated school districts, municipal separate school districts, special municipal separate school districts, and junior colleges.

The Census Bureau does not count the following as separate governments: agricultural high schools, joint agricultural high schools, and joint agricultural high school-junior colleges. County governments control these entities.

== History ==
Prior to 1953, the state had about 1,100 school districts. That year, they were consolidated into 154 school districts.

== Alcorn County ==
- Alcorn School District
- Corinth School District

== Attala County ==
- Attala County School District
- Kosciusko School District

== Bolivar County ==
- Cleveland School District
- North Bolivar Consolidated School District
- West Bolivar Consolidated School District

== Chickasaw County ==
- Chickasaw County School District
- Okolona Municipal Separate School District

== Clarke County ==
- Enterprise School District
- Quitman School District

== Coahoma County ==
- Clarksdale Municipal School District
- Coahoma County School District

== Copiah County ==
- Copiah County School District
- Hazlehurst City School District

== Forrest County ==
- Forrest County Agricultural High School
- Forrest County School District
- Hattiesburg Public School District
- Petal School District

== Hancock County ==
- Bay St. Louis-Waveland School District
- Hancock County School District

== Harrison County ==
- Biloxi Public School District
- Gulfport School District
- Harrison County School District
- Long Beach School District
- Pass Christian School District

== Hinds County ==
- Clinton Public School District
- Hinds County Agricultural High School
- Hinds County School District
- Jackson Public School District

== Itawamba County ==
- Itawamba Agricultural High School
- Itawamba County School District

== Jackson County ==
- Jackson County School District
- Moss Point School District
- Ocean Springs School District
- Pascagoula-Gautier School District

== Jasper County ==
- East Jasper School District
- West Jasper School District

== Jones County ==
- Jones County School District
- Laurel School District

== Lafayette County ==
- Lafayette County School District
- Oxford School District

== Lauderdale County ==
- Lauderdale County School District
- Meridian Public School District

== Lee County ==
- Baldwyn School District
- Lee County School District
- Nettleton School District
- Tupelo Public School District

== Lincoln County ==
- Brookhaven School District
- Lincoln County School District
- Mississippi School of the Arts

== Lowndes County ==
- Columbus Municipal School District
- Lowndes County School District
- Mississippi School for Mathematics and Science

== Madison County ==
- Canton Public School District
- Madison County School District

== Marion County ==
- Columbia School District
- Marion County School District

== Marshall County ==
- Holly Springs School District
- Marshall County School District

== Monroe County ==
- Aberdeen School District
- Amory School District
- Monroe County School District

== Neshoba County ==
- Neshoba County School District
- Philadelphia Public School District

== Newton County ==
- Newton County School District
- Newton Municipal School District
- Union Public School District

== Panola County ==
- North Panola School District
- South Panola School District

== Pearl River County ==
- Pearl River County School District
- Picayune School District
- Poplarville School District

== Perry County ==
- Perry County School District
- Richton School District

== Pike County ==
- McComb School District
- North Pike School District
- South Pike School District

== Pontotoc County ==
- Pontotoc City School District
- Pontotoc County School District

== Prentiss County ==
- Baldwyn School District
- Booneville School District
- Prentiss County School District

== Rankin County ==
- Pearl Public School District
- Rankin County School District

== Scott County ==
- Forest Municipal School District
- Scott County School District

== Tallahatchie County ==
- East Tallahatchie School District
- West Tallahatchie School District

== Tate County ==
- Senatobia Municipal School District
- Tate County School District

== Tippah County ==
- North Tippah School District
- South Tippah School District

== Union County ==
- New Albany School District
- Union County School District

== Washington County ==
- Greenville Public School District
- Hollandale School District
- Leland School District
- Western Line School District

== Yalobusha County ==
- Coffeeville School District
- Water Valley School District

== Yazoo County ==
- Yazoo City Municipal School District
- Yazoo County School District

== Single-district counties ==
- Amite County School District
- Benton County School District
- Calhoun County School District
- Carroll County School District
- Choctaw County School District
- Claiborne County School District
- Covington County School District
- DeSoto County School District
- Franklin County School District
- George County School District
- Greene County School District
- Greenwood-Leflore Consolidated School District (Leflore County)
- Grenada School District
- Holmes County Consolidated School District
- Humphreys County School District
- Jefferson County School District
- Jefferson Davis County School District
- Kemper County School District
- Lamar County School District (extends into Pearl County)
- Lawrence County School District
- Leake County School District
- Louisville Municipal School District (Winston County)
- Natchez-Adams School District (Adams County)
- Noxubee County School District
- Quitman County School District
- Simpson County School District
- Smith County School District
- South Delta School District (Sharkey County)
- Starkville Oktibbeha Consolidated School District (Oktibbeha County)
- Stone County School District
- Sunflower County Consolidated School District
- Tishomingo County School District
- Tunica County School District
- Vicksburg-Warren School District (Warren County)
- Walthall County School District
- Wayne County School District
- Webster County School District
- West Point Consolidated School District (Clay County)
- Wilkinson County School District
- Winona-Montgomery Consolidated School District (Montgomery County)

== Consolidated ==
The following districts previously existed, but have been merged into larger districts:

- Benoit School District
- Clay County School District
- Drew School District
- Durant Public School District
- Greenwood Public School District
- Houston School District
- Indianola School District
- Leflore County School District
- Lumberton Public School District
- Montgomery County School District
- Mound Bayou Public School District
- North Bolivar School District
- Oktibbeha County School District
- Shaw School District
- West Point School District
- Winona Separate School District

== See also ==
- Choctaw Tribal School System – a tribal school system (funded by the federal government) operated by the Mississippi Band of Choctaw Indians
