= List of online high schools in Mississippi =

There are two types of online high school: private schools and public schools.

== Private Schools ==
- North Star Academy
- National High School
- Orange Lutheran High School Online
- Apex Learning High School
- Penn Foster
- Keystone National High School
- Allied National High School
- Christa McAuliffe Academy Online
- Laurel Springs High School
- Abundant Life Academy Online High School
- International Virtual Learning Academy
- K12.COM
- National University Virtual High School
- University of Mississippi High School

== Public Schools ==
- Mississippi Virtual Public School
