= Dumas, Mississippi =

- Town
- Location of Dumas, Mississippi

- Location in the United States
- Coordinates: 34°37′35″N 88°50′23″W
- Country: United States
- State: Mississippi
- County: Tippah

Area
  - Total: 3.89 sq mi (10.08 km^{2})
  - Land: 3.89 sq mi (10.08 km^{2})
  - Water: 0 sq mi (0.00 km^{2})
- Elevation: 591 ft (180 m)

Population (2020)
  - Total: 471
  - Density: 121.0/sq mi (46.71/km^{2})
- Time zone: UTC-6 (Central (CST))
  - Summer (DST): UTC-5 (CDT)
- ZIP code: 38625
- Area code: 662
- FIPS code: 28-20340
- GNIS feature ID: 2406403

Dumas is a town in Tippah County, Mississippi. As of the 2020 census, Dumas had a population of 471.

== Geography ==
According to the United States Census Bureau, the town has a total area of 3.9 square miles (10 km^{2}), all land.

== Demographics ==
Historical population
Census	Pop.	Note	%±
1980	312		—
1990	407		30.4%
2000	452		11.1%
2010	470		4.0%
2020	471		0.2%
U.S. Decennial Census

=== 2020 census ===
Dumas racial composition (NH = Non-Hispanic) (Note: Note: the US Census treats Hispanic/Latino as an ethnic category. This table excludes Latinos from the racial categories and assigns them to a separate category. Hispanics/Latinos can be of any race.)
Race	Number	Percentage
White (NH)	457	97.03%
Black or African American (NH)	1	0.21%
Native American or Alaska Native (NH)	1	0.21%
Mixed/Multi-Racial (NH)	2	0.42%
Hispanic or Latino	10	2.12%
Total	471	

As of the 2020 United States census, there were 471 people, 160 households, and 110 families residing in the town.

=== 2000 census ===
As of the census of 2000, there were 452 people, 181 households, and 133 families residing in the town. The population density was 116.0 inhabitants per square mile (44.8/km^{2}). There were 192 housing units at an average density of 19.0 inhabitants/km^{2} (49.3 inhabitants/mi^{2}). The racial makeup of the town was 98.67% White, 0.00% African American, 0.00% Native American, 0.00% Asian, 0.00% Pacific Islander, 1.33% from other races, and 0.00% from two or more races. 1.77% of the population were Hispanic or Latino of any race.

There were 181 households, out of which 34.3% had children under the age of 18 living with them, 63.0% were married couples living together, 7.7% had a woman whose husband does not live with her, and 26.0% were non-families. 24.3% of all households were made up of individuals, and 11.0% had someone living alone who was 65 years of age or older. The average household size was 2.50 and the average family size was 2.99.

In the town, the population was spread out, with 25.4% under the age of 18, 8.2% from 18 to 24, 29.2% from 25 to 44, 24.8% from 45 to 64, and 12.4% who were 65 years of age or older. The median age was 36 years. For every 100 females, there were 101.8 males. For every 100 females age 18 and over, there were 103.0 males.

The median income for a household in the town was $32,250, and the median income for a family was $40,391. Males had a median income of $30,179 versus $20,341 for females. The per capita income for the town was $13,121. 14.0% of the population and 13.0% of families were below the poverty line. Out of the total people living in poverty, 14.5% were under the age of 18 and 33.3% were 65 or older.

== Education ==
The Town of Dumas is served by the South Tippah School District.

== Notable people ==
Donald Wildmon, minister, head of the American Family Association was born in Dumas.
