= Sullivans Hollow =

Valley in Mississippi, United States of America

Coordinates: 31.8063192°N 89.5107449°W

Sullivan's Hollow is a valley near Mize, Mississippi. The area was home to the outlaw William Cicero "Wild Bill" Sullivan, who was indicted for the murder of his brother, Wilson. Settled originally by Thomas Sullivan (1775–1855) around the year 1820/21, Sullivan's Hollow was considered to be about six miles long by three miles wide. As his children (22 by two wives) established families of their own the area called Sullivan's Hollow expanded. Today the unofficial boundaries of the "hollow" is a triangular area which runs from Mize (in Smith County) to Mount Olive and Hot Coffee in Covington County. The area was supposed by some historians to be an area of great lawlessness.

For example, William "Wild Bill" Sullivan (1851–1932) was reported to have killed forty (some reports claim fifty) men. However historians consulting with long time residents of the county were never able to confirm more than one.

When asked about the clan, long time local residents remarked, "The Sullivans and their neighbors were strong independent people who wanted to be left alone and did not take any guff from anyone. If reports of lawlessness kept outsiders away it was just fine with them."

The Smith County Courthouse has been burned three times. The story goes that shortly before the current courthouse was built in 1912, two Sullivan boys killed a man and were indicted by the grand jury for murder. The legend claims they then burned down the courthouse and hid out for several years. Eventually they turned themselves in and because there was no record of a grand jury indictment they went free. Such stories are common in Smith county.
