= Mize, Mississippi =

- Town
- Mize Post Office

- Location of Mize, Mississippi

- Location in the United States
- Coordinates: 31°52′2″N 89°33′16″W
- Country: United States
- State: Mississippi
- County: Smith

Area
  - Total: 2.44 sq mi (6.32 km^{2})
  - Land: 2.44 sq mi (6.32 km^{2})
  - Water: 0 sq mi (0.00 km^{2})
- Elevation: 300 ft (90 m)

Population (2020)
  - Total: 317
  - Density: 129.9/sq mi (50.16/km^{2})
- Time zone: UTC-6 (Central (CST))
  - Summer (DST): UTC-5 (CDT)
- ZIP code: 39116
- Area code: 601
- FIPS code: 28-48240
- GNIS feature ID: 0690924
- Website: mizems.com

Mize is a town in Smith County, Mississippi, United States. As of the 2020 census, Mize had a population of 317.

It is the home of the Mississippi Watermelon Festival.

== History ==
Mize was settled by Europeans by the early 1900s on the Gulf and Ship Island Railroad lines, though immigrants from Scotland may have settled the area as early as 1810. Choctaw Indians had lived in the area for thousands of years, and were being forced westward by the early 1800s. It is proximate to Sullivan's Hollow, Mississippi, the home of outlaw William Cicero "Wild Bill" Sullivan.

On April 6, 2005, an F-3 tornado struck Mize High School. The school's second floor was ripped off and the entire structure was severely damaged. Reconstruction efforts were completed in 2007.

The mayor of Mize is Joe Hancock.

== Geography ==
According to the United States Census Bureau, the town has a total area of 2.3 square miles (6.0 km^{2}), all land.

== Demographics ==
Historical population
Census	Pop.	Note	%±
1910	321		—
1920	332		3.4%
1930	429		29.2%
1940	561		30.8%
1950	430		−23.4%
1960	371		−13.7%
1970	372		0.3%
1980	363		−2.4%
1990	312		−14.0%
2000	285		−8.7%
2010	340		19.3%
2020	317		−6.8%
U.S. Decennial Census

Mize racial composition as of 2020
Race	Num.	Perc.
White (non-Hispanic)	294	92.74%
Black or African American (non-Hispanic)	5	1.58%
Other/Mixed	13	4.1%
Hispanic or Latino	5	1.58%

As of the 2020 United States census, there were 317 people, 88 households, and 64 families residing in the town.

== Education ==
The Town of Mize is served by the Smith County School District. Mize Attendance Center (K-12) provides education for the area. The school's mascot is Bully the Bulldog. The school's colors are blue and gold.

== Notable people ==
- Eric Clark, Secretary of State of Mississippi from 1996 to 2008
- Eugene Sims, former professional football player for St. Louis/Los Angeles Rams (2010–2016)
- Prentiss Walker, the first Republican to represent Mississippi in the U.S. House of Representatives since Reconstruction

== See also ==
- Sullivans Hollow, a nearby valley
