= Rob Petitti =

American football player (born 1982)

No. 79, 71, 64, 78
- Position: Offensive tackle

Personal information
- Born: May 21, 1982 (age 44); Clark, New Jersey, U.S.
- Listed height: 6 ft 6 in (1.98 m)
- Listed weight: 327 lb (148 kg)

Career information
- High school: Rumson-Fair Haven (NJ)
- College: Pittsburgh
- NFL draft: 2005: 6th round, 209th overall pick

Career history
- Dallas Cowboys (2005); New Orleans Saints (2006); St. Louis Rams (2007–2008); Florida Tuskers (2009); Carolina Panthers (2009–2010)

Awards and highlights
- Third-team All-American (2004); 2× All-Big East (2003, 2004); First-team All-ECAC (2003); Second-team All-Big East (2002)

Career NFL statistics
- Games played: 27
- Games started: 17
- Fumble recoveries: 1
- Stats at Pro Football Reference

Rob Christopher Petitti (born May 21, 1982) is an American former professional football player who was an offensive tackle in the National Football League (NFL) for the Dallas Cowboys, New Orleans Saints, St. Louis Rams and Carolina Panthers. He played college football for the Pittsburgh Panthers.

== Early life ==
Petitti attended Rumson-Fair Haven High School, where he was a three-year starter as a two-way tackle. He was a two-time All-Division, All-Shore, All-County selection and was twice named to the All-New Jersey Group I team. He recorded 80 tackles during his final two seasons. He also practiced basketball.

== College career ==
Petitti accepted a football scholarship from the University of Pittsburgh, where he became a four-year starter at left tackle. As a redshirt freshman, he started 12 games at left tackle. As a sophomore, he started 13 games.

As a junior in 2003, he earned first-team All-Big East and All-Eastern College Athletic Conference honors. He was named the coaching staff's Co-Lineman of the Game for the Ball State contest and Co-Blocker of the Game against Syracuse. For the season he recorded 87 knockdowns with eight touchdown-resulting blocks and allowed 7.5 of the team's 43 quarterback sacks.

In 2004, he missed the game against Temple University because of a concussion, ending a streak of 42 consecutive starts. He was a second-team All-American selection by The Sporting News and College Football News, third-team from The NFL Draft Report and Associated Press. He was a unanimous first-team All-Big East selection by the coaches. Petitti was also a three-time All-Big East pick, becoming the first school offensive lineman to achieve this recognition since Ruben Brown was a three-time selection from 1992 to 1994. He finished his college career after playing and starting in 49 games, missing just a single contest due to injury.

== Professional career ==
Pre-draft measurables
Height	Weight	40-yard dash
6 ft 5 7/8 in (1.98 m)	347 lb (157 kg)	5.48 s
All values from NFL Combine/Pro Day

=== Dallas Cowboys ===
Petitti was selected by the Dallas Cowboys in the sixth round (209 overall) of the 2005 NFL draft, after dropping because of an injury-plagued senior season.

He won the starting right tackle job over Jacob Rogers and Torrin Tucker. He made his first NFL start at offensive tackle in the season opener, making him the third rookie in franchise history to achieve that feat. By doing so, he became only the second rookie after Dave Widell in 1988, to start an opener at offensive tackle in franchise history. That year, he and Larry Allen were the only two offensive players for the Cowboys to play every offensive snap, although he struggled in the last month of the season.

Because of his significant playing time as a rookie, Pettiti earned $271,287 in performance pay, doubling his signing bonus and minimum base salary. In 2006, the signing of Jason Fabini, combined with the play of Marc Colombo and rookie Pat McQuistan, made him expendable and led to his release on September 2, 2006.

=== New Orleans Saints ===
On September 4, 2006, Petitti — along with Cowboys teammate Terrance Copper — was claimed off waivers by the New Orleans Saints, reuniting him with new head coach and former Cowboys offensive coordinator Sean Payton. He was a backup behind Jon Stinchcomb and was declared inactive until the season finale against the Carolina Panthers. He was declared inactive in both playoff contests. He was waived on August 31, 2007.

=== St. Louis Rams ===
On October 24, 2007, he was signed by the St. Louis Rams to a two-year, $1.1 million contract, to fill the roster spot vacated the release of Claude Terrell, after he was released for allegedly assaulted his wife. He played in five games, with one start and also recovered one fumble.

On July 23, 2008, he was waived/injured by the Rams, after tearing his Achilles tendon during the offseason conditioning program.

=== Florida Tuskers ===
Petitti was selected by the Florida Tuskers in the UFL Premiere Season Draft. He signed with the team on August 25, 2009.

=== Carolina Panthers ===
On December 15, 2009, he was signed by the Carolina Panthers to replace an injured Jeff Otah. He appeared in five games as a backup. He was re-signed on March 15, 2010, released on September 4 and signed once more on December 1. He wasn't re-signed after the season.
