= Tishomingo County School District =

School district in Mississippi

The Tishomingo County School District is a public school district based in Iuka, Mississippi (USA). The district serves all of Tishomingo County.

== Schools ==
- Tishomingo County High School
- Iuka Middle School
- Burnsville Elementary/Middle School
- Iuka Elementary School
- Tishomingo Elementary School
- Belmont School
- Tishomingo County Career and Technical Center

== Demographics ==
There were a total of 3,327 students enrolled in the Tishomingo County School District during the 2006–2007 school year. The gender makeup of the district was 49% female and 51% male. The racial makeup of the district was 3.13% African American, 93.99% White, 2.83% Hispanic, and 0.06% Asian. 45.0% of the district's students were eligible to receive free lunch.

== Accountability statistics ==
	2006-07	2005-06	2004-05	2003-04	2002-03
District Accreditation Status	Accredited	Accredited	Accredited	Accredited	Accredited
School Performance Classifications
Level 5 (Superior Performing) Schools	3	4	3	6	4
Level 4 (Exemplary) Schools	2	2	3	0	2
Level 3 (Successful) Schools	1	0	0	0	0
Level 2 (Under Performing) Schools	0	0	0	0	0
Level 1 (Low Performing) Schools	0	0	0	0	0
Not Assigned	0	0	0	0	0

== See also ==
- List of school districts in Mississippi
- List of high schools in Mississippi
