= Tate County, Mississippi =

County in Mississippi, United States

- County
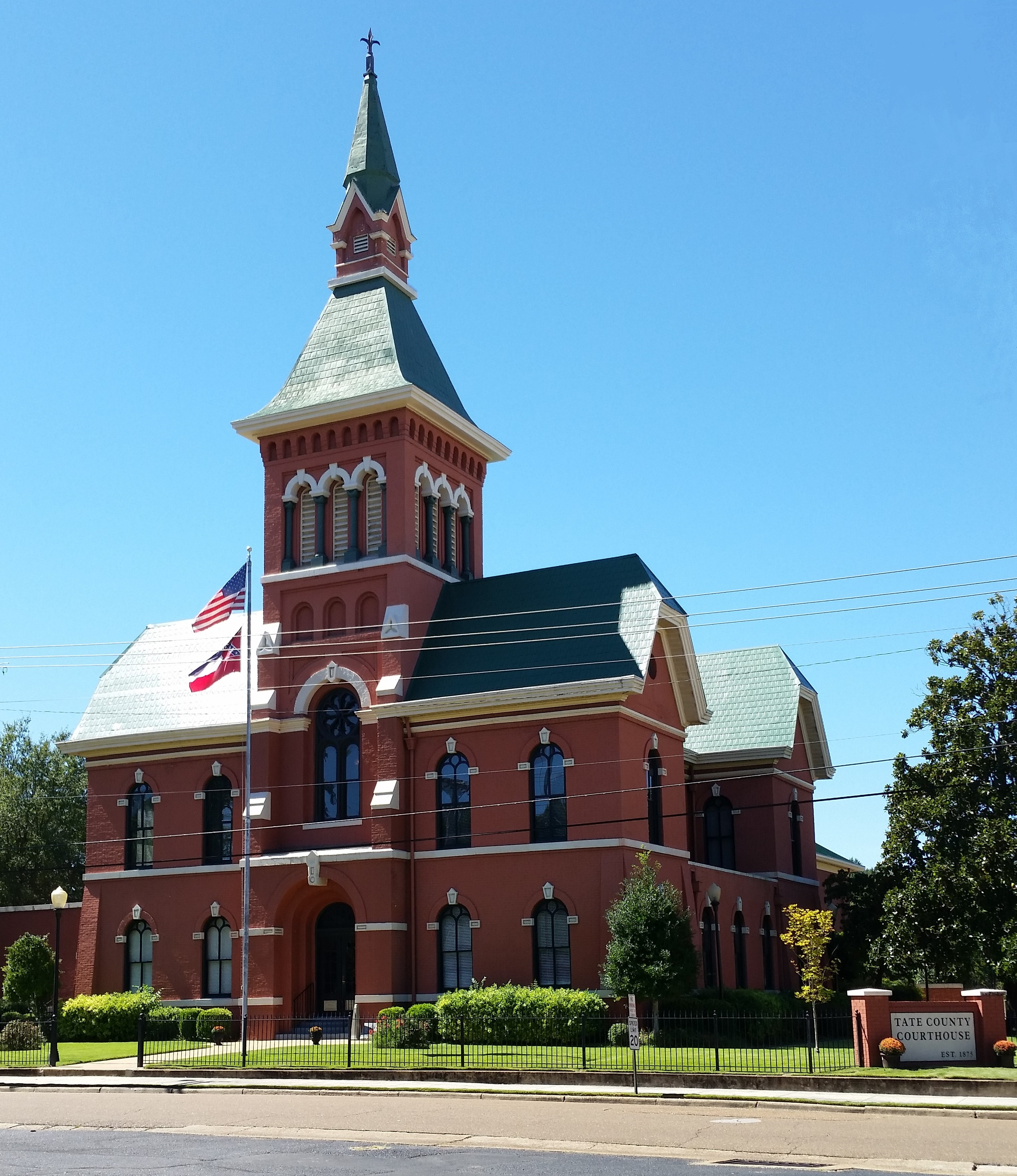
- Tate County Courthouse in Senatobia

- Location within the U.S. state of Mississippi
- Coordinates: 34°39′N 89°56′W
- Country: United States
- State: Mississippi
- Founded: 1873
- Seat: Senatobia
- Largest city: Senatobia

Area
  - Total: 411 sq mi (1,060 km^{2})
  - Land: 405 sq mi (1,050 km^{2})
  - Water: 6.2 sq mi (16 km^{2}) 1.5%

Population (2020)
  - Total: 28,064
  - Estimate (2025): 28,725 ▲
  - Density: 69.3/sq mi (26.8/km^{2})
- Time zone: UTC−6 (Central)
  - Summer (DST): UTC−5 (CDT)
- Congressional district: 1st
- Website: tatecountyms.gov

Tate County is a county located in the northwestern portion of the U.S. state of Mississippi. As of the 2020 census, the population was 28,064. Its county seat is Senatobia. Organized in 1873 during the Reconstruction era, from portions of DeSoto, Marshall, and Tunica counties, the county is named for Thomas Simpson Tate, one of the first prominent American settlers of the area.

Tate County is part of the Memphis, TN-MS-AR Metropolitan Statistical Area. It is located about 40 miles (64 km) south of Memphis and one county east of the Mississippi River. This fertile river valley was developed for cotton cultivation in the 19th century.

== History ==
As it was developed for cotton culture in the antebellum years, planters in the county depended on the labor of African American slaves. Blacks comprised a majority of the population for many decades. After Reconstruction, whites sometimes enforced their dominance through political intimidation or violence against blacks.

In 1932, a deputy sheriff and son of County Sheriff C.A. Williams, was allegedly shot by a black man, Jesse Williams. Sheriff Williams illegally organized a posse and murdered at least five and possibly as many as seven black people, family members of a man known as "Judge" Crawford. A month later Jesse Williams was caught, "tried" and lynched by hanging. No charges were ever considered against the sheriff or lynch mob.

== Geography ==
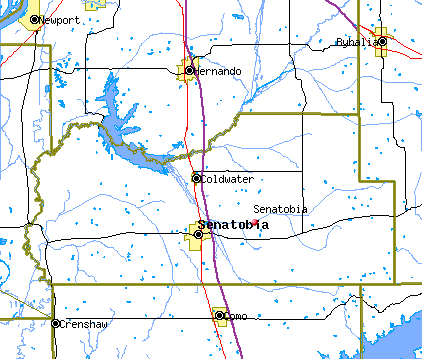
Map of Tate County

According to the U.S. Census Bureau, the county has a total area of 411 square miles (1,060 km^{2}), of which 405 square miles (1,050 km^{2}) is land and 6.2 square miles (16 km^{2}) (1.5%) is water. It is the third-smallest county in Mississippi by land area.

=== Major highways ===
- Interstate 55
- U.S. Route 51
- Mississippi Highway 3
- Mississippi Highway 4
- Mississippi Scenic Highway 304
- Mississippi Highway 305
- Mississippi Highway 306
- Mississippi Highway 740

=== Adjacent counties ===
- DeSoto County (north)
- Marshall County (east)
- Lafayette County (southeast)
- Panola County (south)
- Tunica County (west)

== Demographics ==
Historical population
Census	Pop.	Note	%±
1880	18,721		—
1890	19,253		2.8%
1900	20,618		7.1%
1910	19,714		−4.4%
1920	19,636		−0.4%
1930	17,671		−10.0%
1940	19,309		9.3%
1950	18,011		−6.7%
1960	18,138		0.7%
1970	18,544		2.2%
1980	20,119		8.5%
1990	21,432		6.5%
2000	25,370		18.4%
2010	28,886		13.9%
2020	28,064		−2.8%
2025 (est.)	28,725	▲	2.4%
U.S. Decennial Census; 1790-1960 1900-1990; 1990-2000 2010-2013

=== Racial and ethnic composition ===
Tate County, Mississippi – Racial and ethnic composition Note: the US Census treats Hispanic/Latino as an ethnic category. This table excludes Latinos from the racial categories and assigns them to a separate category. Hispanics/Latinos may be of any race.
Race / Ethnicity (NH = Non-Hispanic)	Pop 1980	Pop 1990	Pop 2000	Pop 2010	Pop 2020	% 1980	% 1990	% 2000	% 2010	% 2020
White alone (NH)	12,287	13,888	17,093	19,091	18,019	61.07%	64.80%	67.37%	66.09%	64.21%
Black or African American alone (NH)	7,539	7,361	7,844	8,723	8,231	37.47%	34.35%	30.92%	30.20%	29.33%
Native American or Alaska Native alone (NH)	11	36	48	62	52	0.05%	0.17%	0.19%	0.21%	0.19%
Asian alone (NH)	18	26	23	65	63	0.09%	0.12%	0.09%	0.23%	0.22%
Native Hawaiian or Pacific Islander alone (NH)	x	x	10	2	1	x	x	0.04%	0.01%	0.00%
Other race alone (NH)	3	0	8	18	81	0.01%	0.00%	0.03%	0.06%	0.29%
Mixed race or Multiracial (NH)	x	x	121	286	812	x	x	0.48%	0.99%	2.89%
Hispanic or Latino (any race)	261	121	223	639	805	1.30%	0.56%	0.88%	2.21%	2.87%
Total	20,119	21,432	25,370	28,886	28,064	100.00%	100.00%	100.00%	100.00%	100.00%

=== 2020 census ===
As of the 2020 census, the county had a population of 28,064. The median age was 39.1 years. 22.6% of residents were under the age of 18 and 17.2% of residents were 65 years of age or older. For every 100 females there were 94.6 males, and for every 100 females age 18 and over there were 92.9 males age 18 and over.

The racial makeup of the county was 64.7% White, 29.4% Black or African American, 0.3% American Indian and Alaska Native, 0.2% Asian, <0.1% Native Hawaiian and Pacific Islander, 1.7% from some other race, and 3.6% from two or more races. Hispanic or Latino residents of any race comprised 2.9% of the population.

24.3% of residents lived in urban areas, while 75.7% lived in rural areas.

There were 10,201 households in the county, of which 32.7% had children under the age of 18 living in them. Of all households, 47.6% were married-couple households, 17.6% were households with a male householder and no spouse or partner present, and 29.3% were households with a female householder and no spouse or partner present. About 25.6% of all households were made up of individuals and 12.1% had someone living alone who was 65 years of age or older.

There were 11,307 housing units, of which 9.8% were vacant. Among occupied housing units, 74.4% were owner-occupied and 25.6% were renter-occupied. The homeowner vacancy rate was 0.6% and the rental vacancy rate was 17.3%.

=== 2000 census ===
As of the census of 2000, there were 25,370 people, 8,850 households, and 6,717 families residing in the county. The population density was 63 inhabitants per square mile (24/km^{2}). There were 9,354 housing units at an average density of 23 per square mile (8.9/km^{2}). The racial makeup of the county was 67.84% White, 31.02% Black or African American, 0.20% Native American, 0.10% Asian, 0.04% Pacific Islander, 0.25% from other races, and 0.56% from two or more races. 0.88% of the population were Hispanic or Latino of any race.

There were 8,850 households, out of which 36.10% had children under the age of 18 living with them, 56.00% were married couples living together, 15.50% had a female householder with no husband present, and 24.10% were non-families. 21.30% of all households were made up of individuals, and 9.10% had someone living alone who was 65 years of age or older. The average household size was 2.74 and the average family size was 3.18.

As of 2000, the county's population was spread out, with 27.10% under the age of 18, 11.70% from 18 to 24, 27.50% from 25 to 44, 22.30% from 45 to 64, and 11.40% who were 65 years of age or older. The median age was 34 years. For every 100 females there were 93.70 males. For every 100 females age 18 and over, there were 90.50 males.

The median income for a household in the county was $35,836, and the median income for a family was $41,423. Males had a median income of $33,064 versus $21,154 for females. The per capita income for the county was $16,154. About 10.60% of families and 13.50% of the population were below the poverty line, including 14.20% of those under age 18 and 21.10% of those age 65 or over.

== Communities ==
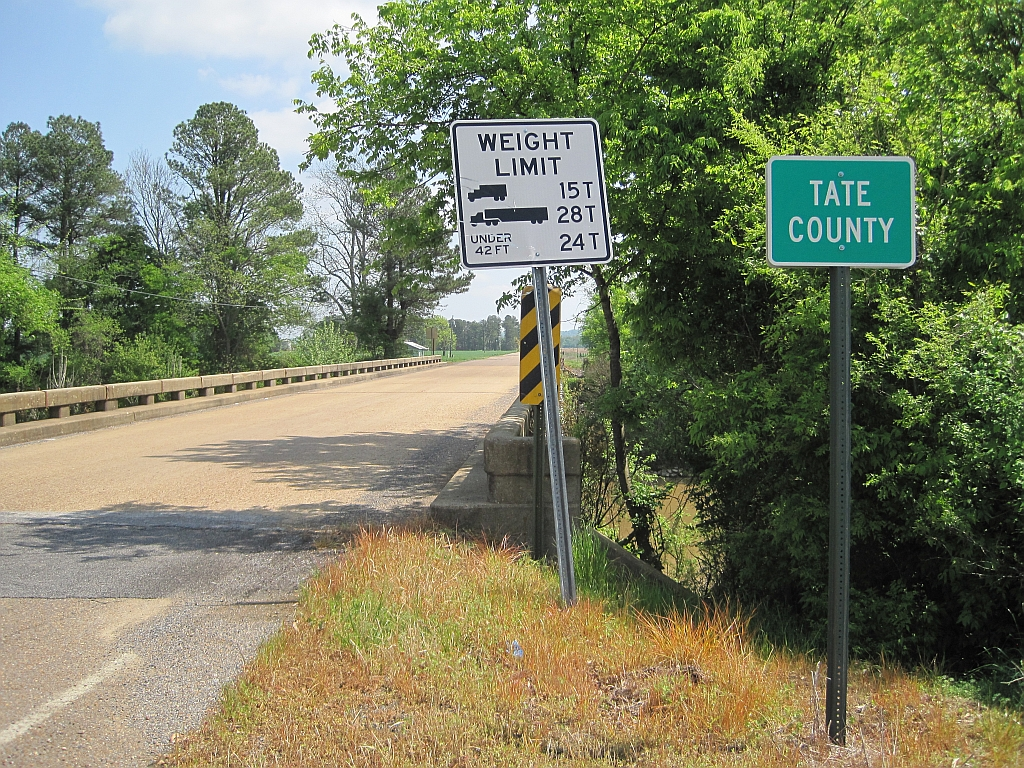
Highway sign when entering Tate County

=== City ===
- Senatobia (county seat)

=== Town ===
- Coldwater

=== Census-designated places ===
- Arkabutla
- Independence
- Strayhorn

=== Unincorporated communities ===
- Cottonville
- Looxahoma
- Sarah
- Savage
- Thyatira
- Tyro

== Education ==
The school districts are:

- Senatobia Municipal School District
- Tate County School District

Northwest Mississippi Community College has its main campus in Senatobia.

== Politics ==
Tate County has, since 1980, been a Republican stronghold, having shifted from being nearly unanimously Democratic for the first half of the 20th Century.

United States presidential election results for Tate County, Mississippi
Year	Republican		Democratic		Third party(ies)	
Year	No.	%	No.	%	No.	%
1912	23	3.26%	612	86.81%	70	9.93%
1916	18	1.64%	1,074	97.73%	7	0.64%
1920	117	11.65%	876	87.25%	11	1.10%
1924	6	0.59%	1,002	98.82%	6	0.59%
1928	42	3.19%	1,274	96.81%	0	0.00%
1932	9	0.90%	986	99.00%	1	0.10%
1936	7	0.64%	1,088	99.36%	0	0.00%
1940	3	0.19%	1,609	99.81%	0	0.00%
1944	29	1.95%	1,455	98.05%	0	0.00%
1948	16	1.13%	199	14.09%	1,197	84.77%
1952	387	19.72%	1,575	80.28%	0	0.00%
1956	171	9.78%	1,414	80.85%	164	9.38%
1960	241	13.60%	686	38.71%	845	47.69%
1964	2,390	89.41%	283	10.59%	0	0.00%
1968	605	13.22%	1,162	25.39%	2,810	61.39%
1972	3,966	75.74%	1,151	21.98%	119	2.27%
1976	2,497	38.80%	3,747	58.22%	192	2.98%
1980	3,343	45.38%	3,892	52.84%	131	1.78%
1984	4,677	61.89%	2,846	37.66%	34	0.45%
1988	4,553	61.12%	2,872	38.56%	24	0.32%
1992	4,196	50.13%	3,519	42.04%	656	7.84%
1996	3,694	50.40%	3,195	43.59%	441	6.02%
2000	5,148	59.22%	3,441	39.58%	104	1.20%
2004	6,760	60.54%	4,347	38.93%	60	0.54%
2008	7,678	60.09%	5,003	39.15%	97	0.76%
2012	7,332	59.10%	4,933	39.76%	141	1.14%
2016	7,495	64.46%	3,926	33.77%	206	1.77%
2020	8,707	66.50%	4,183	31.95%	203	1.55%
2024	9,185	71.42%	3,555	27.64%	121	0.94%

== Notable people ==
- Actor James Earl Jones was born in Arkabutla, Mississippi, an unincorporated area of Tate County and lived here for five years. He was sent north to live with his maternal grandparents on their farm in Jackson, Michigan.

== See also ==
- Dry counties
- National Register of Historic Places listings in Tate County, Mississippi
- Northwest Mississippi Community College
- U.S.S. Tate
