= Walthall County School District =

School district in Mississippi

The Walthall County School District is a public school district based in Tylertown, Mississippi (USA). The district's boundaries parallel that of Walthall County.

== Schools ==
- Tylertown High School
- Tylertown Upper Elementary School
- Tylertown Lower Elementary School
- Tylertown Primary School
- Dexter Attendance Center
- Salem Attendance Center

== Demographics ==
=== 2006-07 school year ===
There were a total of 2,616 students enrolled in the Walthall County School District during the 2006–2007 school year. The gender makeup of the district was 47% female and 53% male. The racial makeup of the district was 65.02% African American, 34.21% White, 0.42% Hispanic, 0.15% Asian, and 0.19% Native American. 65.4% of the district's students were eligible to receive free lunch.

=== Previous school years ===
School Year	Enrollment	Gender Makeup		Racial Makeup				
School Year	Enrollment	Female	Male	Asian	African American	Hispanic	Native American	White
2005-06	2,732	48%	52%	0.15%	63.18%	0.33%	0.11%	36.24%
2004-05	2,703	48%	52%	0.15%	63.60%	0.30%	0.15%	35.81%
2003-04	2,685	47%	53%	0.15%	63.61%	0.26%	0.15%	35.83%
2002-03	2,695	47%	53%	0.11%	63.75%	0.41%	0.15%	35.58%

== Accountability statistics ==
	2006-07	2005-06	2004-05	2003-04	2002-03
District Accreditation Status	Accredited	Accredited	Accredited	Accredited	Accredited
School Performance Classifications
Level 5 (Superior Performing) Schools	0	0	0	0	0
Level 4 (Exemplary) Schools	1	1	1	1	1
Level 3 (Successful) Schools	2	4	4	3	3
Level 2 (Under Performing) Schools	2	0	0	0	0
Level 1 (Low Performing) Schools	0	0	0	0	0
Not Assigned	1	1	1	1	1

== Racial Segregation ==
On April 13, 2010 the US District Court of Southern Mississippi found that the school board was in violation of a 1970 desegregation law for allowing white students at the Tylertown-based schools to transfer to Salem Academy, resulting in predominantly African American classrooms in Tylertown and White classrooms at Salem. The school board had admitted to their computer system using race as a factor in creating classroom assignments for each class of an upcoming school year.

== See also ==
- List of school districts in Mississippi
