= Tate County School District =

School district in Mississippi

The Tate County School District is a public school district based in Tate County, Mississippi, United States.

The district serves the town of Coldwater; the census-designated places of Arkabutla, Independence, and Strayhorn; and the unincorporated community of Sarah, as well as most rural areas in Tate County.

"The Tate County School District exists to educate all students to be college and career ready, and to develop a lifelong love for learning."

== Schools ==
- Coldwater Elementary School
- Coldwater High School
- East Tate Elementary School
- Independence High School
- Senatobia Tate County - Career & Technical Center
- Strayhorn Elementary School
- Strayhorn High School

== Demographics ==
=== 2017-2018 & 2018-2019 school years ===
Tate County School District contains seven schools and 2,097 students. The district's minority enrollment was 50%. 99.1% of students were economically disadvantaged.

The student body at the schools served by Tate County School District was 56.8% White, 32% Black, 0.1% Asian or Asian/Pacific Islander, 6.6% Hispanic/Latino, 0% American Indian or Alaska Native, and 0% Native Hawaiian or other Pacific Islander. In addition, 4.5% of students were two or more races, and 0% did not specify their race or ethnicity.

50% of students were female, and 50% of students were male. At schools in Tate County School District, 99.1% of students were eligible to participate in the federal free and reduced price meal program and 5.1% of students were English language learners.

Within Tate County School District, 99.1% of teachers were licensed, and 82.7% had three or more years of experience. The student-to-teacher ratio was lower than the state average, at 14:1. The district had four full-time counsellors on staff.

=== Previous school years ===
School year	Enrollment	Gender makeup		Racial makeup				
School year	Enrollment	Female	Male	Asian	African American	Hispanic	Native American	White
2005-06	2,847	48%	52%	0.21%	44.57%	1.90%	–	53.32%
2004-05	2,794	49%	51%	0.14%	47.57%	1.47%	–	50.82%
2003-04	2,863	49%	51%	0.03%	46.73%	1.15%	–	52.08%
2002-03	2,845	49%	51%	0.11%	47.24%	1.37%	–	51.28%

== Accountability statistics ==
	2006-07	2005-06	2004-05	2003-04	2002-03
District accreditation status	Accredited	Accredited	Accredited	Probation	Advised
School performance classifications
Level 5 (Superior Performing) Schools	0	0	0	0	0
Level 4 (Exemplary) Schools	0	2	1	2	1
Level 3 (Successful) Schools	5	2	2	3	2
Level 2 (Under Performing) Schools	1	1	2	0	1
Level 1 (Low Performing) Schools	1	0	0	0	1
Not assigned	0	0	0	0	0

== See also ==
- List of school districts in Mississippi
