= Forrest County School District =

School district in Mississippi, United States

Address
- 400 Forrest Street Hattiesburg, Mississippi, 39401; United States
- Coordinates: 31.326962°N 89.293061°W

District information
- Type: Public
- Grades: PK–12
- Schools: 6
- NCES District ID: 2801490

Students and staff
- Students: 2,124 (2024–2025)
- Teachers: 181.00 (on an FTE basis) (2024–2025)
- Staff: 217.42 (on an FTE basis) (2024–2025)
- Student–teacher ratio: 11.73 (2024–2025)

Other information
- Website: www.fcsd.us

The Forrest County School District is a public school district with its headquarters in Hattiesburg, Mississippi (USA)

It serves sections of Forrest County, including portions of Hattiesburg, Glendale, and Rawls Springs.

Brooklyn is the largest community in the district.

== Schools ==
- Grades 7-12
  - North Forrest High School
- Grades K-6
  - North Forrest Elementary
  - Rawls Springs Attendance Center
  - Earl Travillion Attendance Center
- Grades K-8
  - Dixie Attendance Center
  - South Forrest Attendance Center

== Demographics ==
=== 2006-07 school year ===
There were a total of 2,506 students enrolled in the Forrest County School District during the 2006–2007 school year. The gender makeup of the district was 49% female and 51% male. The racial makeup of the district was 41.30% African American, 57.42% White, 0.84% Hispanic, 0.36% Asian, and 0.08% Native American. 56.5% of the district's students were eligible to receive free lunch.

=== Previous school years ===
School Year	Enrollment	Gender Makeup		Racial Makeup				
School Year	Enrollment	Female	Male	Asian	African American	Hispanic	Native American	White
2005-06	2,488	49%	51%	0.28%	42.52%	0.56%	0.04%	56.59%
2004-05	2,408	48%	52%	0.21%	39.87%	0.75%	0.04%	59.14%
2003-04	2,482	49%	51%	0.20%	39.56%	0.64%	0.04%	59.55%
2002-03	2,376	48%	52%	0.29%	38.76%	0.67%	0.13%	60.14%

== Accountability statistics ==
	2006-07	2005-06	2004-05	2003-04	2002-03
District Accreditation Status	Accredited	Accredited	Accredited	Accredited	Accredited
School Performance Classifications
Level 5 (Superior Performing) Schools	0	2	2	2	1
Level 4 (Exemplary) Schools	2	3	2	1	2
Level 3 (Successful) Schools	3	1	2	3	2
Level 2 (Under Performing) Schools	1	0	0	0	0
Level 1 (Low Performing) Schools	0	0	0	0	1
Not Assigned	0	0	0	0	0

== See also ==
- List of school districts in Mississippi
