= Marshall County School District (Mississippi) =

School district in Mississippi

The Marshall County School District is a public school district based in Marshall County, Mississippi, United States.

The district serves the towns of Byhalia and Potts Camp, as well as most rural areas in Marshall County.

== Schools ==
- Byhalia High School (grades 9-12)
- Potts Camp High School (grades 4-12)
- H. W. Byers High School (grades 7-12)
- Byhalia Middle School (grades 5-8)
- Byhalia Elementary School (grades K-4)
- H. W. Byers Elementary School (grades K-6)
- Mary Reid Elementary School (grades K-3)
- Galena School (grades K-8)

== Demographics ==
=== School years ===
| School year | Enrollment | Gender makeup | | Racial Makeup | | | |
| School year | Enrollment | Female | Male | Two or more Races | African American | Hispanic | White |
|---|---|---|---|---|---|---|---|
| 2025-26 | 2,733 | 47.6% | 52.4% | 10.79% | 40.1% | 23.12% | 25.69% |
| 2024-25 | 2,773 | 47.93% | 52.07% | 11.43% | 41.07% | 21.67% | 25.6% |
| 2023-24 | 2,678 | 47.12% | 52.88% | 7.06% | 44.85% | 16.65% | 31.25% |

- some data excluded due to source hiding it.

== Accountability statistics ==
| | 2006-07 | 2005-06 | 2004-05 | 2003-04 | 2002-03 |
|---|---|---|---|---|---|
| District accreditation status | Accredited | Accredited | Advised | Accredited | Accredited |
School performance classifications
| Level 5 (Superior Performing) Schools | 0 | 0 | 0 | 1 | 1 |
| Level 4 (Exemplary) Schools | 2 | 0 | 0 | 1 | 2 |
| Level 3 (Successful) Schools | 4 | 6 | 5 | 1 | 0 |
| Level 2 (Under Performing) Schools | 2 | 1 | 2 | 3 | 1 |
| Level 1 (Low Performing) Schools | 0 | 0 | 0 | 0 | 2 |
| Not assigned | 0 | 0 | 0 | 0 | 0 |

== See also ==
- List of school districts in Mississippi
