= Holly Springs School District =

School district in Mississippi

The Holly Springs School District is a public school district based in Holly Springs, Mississippi (USA).

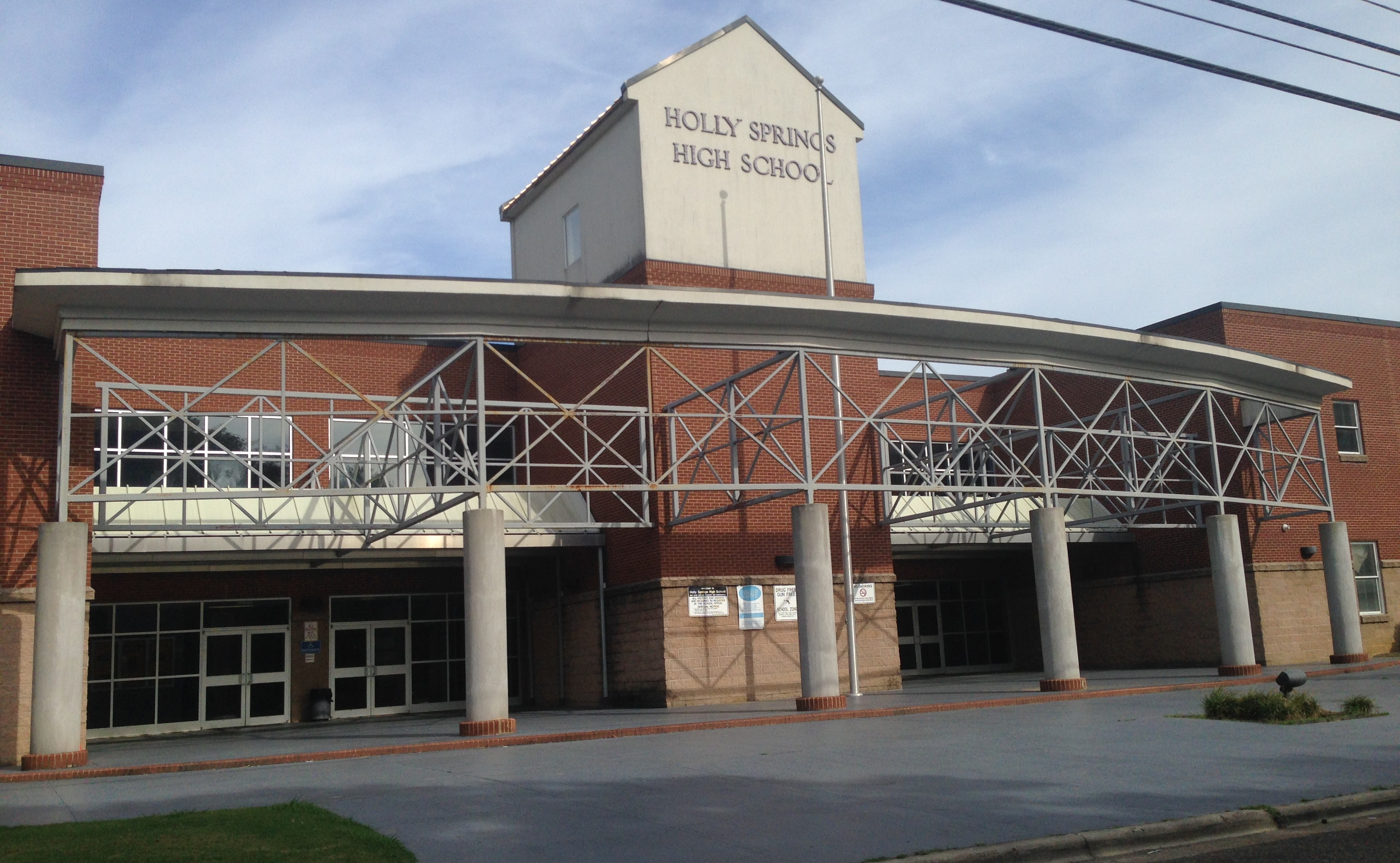
Holly Springs High School

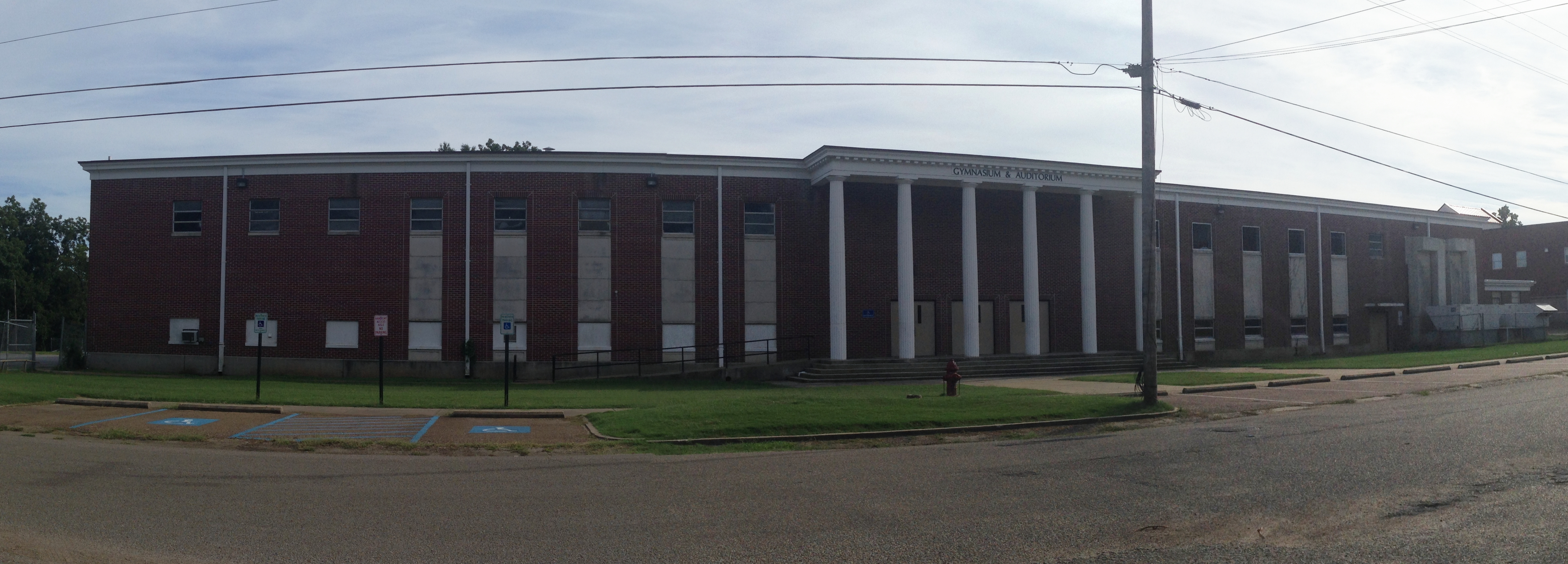
Gymnasium and auditorium

== Schools ==
- Holly Springs High School (Grades 9-12)
- Holly Springs Junior High School (Grades 7-8)
- Holly Springs Intermediate School (Grades 4-6)
- Holly Springs Primary School (Grades PK-3)

== Demographics ==
=== 2006–2007 school year ===
There were a total of 1,985 students enrolled in the Holly Springs School District during the 2006–2007 school year. The gender makeup of the district was 50% female and 50% male. The racial makeup of the district was 97.76% African American, 1.74% White, 0.45% Hispanic, and 0.06% Asian. 77.2% of the district's students were eligible to receive free lunch.

=== Previous school years ===
School Year	Enrollment	Gender Makeup		Racial Makeup				
School Year	Enrollment	Female	Male	Asian	African American	Hispanic	Native American	White
2005-06	1,746	50%	50%	–	98.17%	0.34%	–	1.49%
2004-05	1,784	49%	51%	–	97.37%	0.22%	–	2.41%
2003-04	1,816	50%	50%	0.06%	97.08%	0.50%	–	2.37%
2002-03	1,893	49%	51%	0.26%	96.46%	0.26%	–	3.01%

== Accountability statistics ==
	2006-07	2005-06	2004-05	2003-04	2002-03
District Accreditation Status	Advised	Accredited	Accredited	Accredited	Accredited
School Performance Classifications
Level 5 (Superior Performing) Schools	0	0	0	0	0
Level 4 (Exemplary) Schools	0	0	0	0	0
Level 3 (Successful) Schools	0	0	0	0	0
Level 2 (Under Performing) Schools	3	2	2	2	3
Level 1 (Low Performing) Schools	0	0	0	0	0
Not Assigned	1	1	1	1	0

== See also ==
- List of school districts in Mississippi
