= Forest Municipal School District =

School district in Mississippi

Address
- 325 Cleveland Street Forest, Mississippi, 39074; United States
- Coordinates: 32.368355°N 89.485511°W

District information
- Type: Public
- Grades: PK–12
- Schools: 3
- NCES District ID: 2801470

Students and staff
- Students: 1,638 (2024–2025)
- Teachers: 106.00 (on an FTE basis) (2024–2025)
- Staff: 134.33 (on an FTE basis) (2024–2025)
- Student–teacher ratio: 15.45 (2024–2025)

The Forest Municipal School District is a public school district based in Forest, Mississippi (USA).

In addition to almost all of Forest, the district also serves most of Hillsboro, and rural areas in south central Scott County.

== Schools ==
- Forest High School (Grades 9–12)
- Hawkins Middle School (Grades 5–8)
- Forest Elementary School (Grades K-4)

== Demographics ==
=== 2006-07 school year ===
There were a total of 1,550 students enrolled in the Forest Municipal School District during the 2006–2007 school year. The gender makeup of the district was 48% female and 52% male. The racial makeup of the district was 65.55% African American, 20.84% White, 13.35% Hispanic, and 0.26% Asian. 73.6% of the district's students were eligible to receive free lunch.

=== Previous school years ===
School Year	Enrollment	Gender Makeup		Racial Makeup				
School Year	Enrollment	Female	Male	Asian	African American	Hispanic	Native American	White
2005-06	1,609	48%	52%	0.25%	64.08%	12.37%	0.12%	23.18%
2004-05	1,596	48%	52%	0.25%	64.29%	11.59%	0.06%	23.81%
2003-04	1,623	48%	52%	0.43%	64.20%	10.66%	–	24.71%
2002-03	1,645	48%	52%	0.55%	65.05%	8.75%	–	25.65%

== Accountability statistics ==
	2006-07	2005-06	2004-05	2003-04	2002-03
District Accreditation Status	Accredited	Accredited	Accredited	Accredited	Accredited
School Performance Classifications
Level 5 (Superior Performing) Schools	0	0	0	0	0
Level 4 (Exemplary) Schools	0	0	0	0	0
Level 3 (Successful) Schools	3	3	3	3	2
Level 2 (Under Performing) Schools	0	0	0	0	1
Level 1 (Low Performing) Schools	0	0	0	0	0
Not Assigned	0	0	0	0	0

== See also ==
- List of school districts in Mississippi
