= Richton School District =

School district in Mississippi

Address
- 701 Elm Avenue Richton, Mississippi, 39476; United States

District information
- Type: Public
- Grades: PK–12
- Schools: 2
- NCES District ID: 2803870

Students and staff
- Students: 586 (2025–2026)
- Teachers: 45.00 (on an FTE basis) (2025–2026)
- Staff: 38.85 (on an FTE basis) (2025–2026)
- Student–teacher ratio: 13.02 (2025–2026)

Other information
- Website: www.richtonschools.com

The Richton School District is a public school district based in Richton, Mississippi (USA).

In addition to Richton, the district also serves rural areas in northeastern Perry County.

== Schools ==
- Richton High School (Grades 7-12)
- Richton Elementary School (Grades K-6)

== Demographics ==
=== 2006-07 school year ===
There were a total of 760 students enrolled in the Richton School District during the 2006–2007 school year. The gender makeup of the district was 51% female and 49% male. The racial makeup of the district was 25.66% African American, 72.89% White, 1.18% Hispanic, and 0.26% Asian. 54.0% of the district's students were eligible to receive free lunch.

=== Previous school years ===
School Year	Enrollment	Gender Makeup		Racial Makeup				
School Year	Enrollment	Female	Male	Asian	African American	Hispanic	Native American	White
2005-06	722	52%	48%	–	25.48%	0.83%	–	73.68%
2004-05	761	52%	48%	–	26.02%	0.53%	–	73.46%
2003-04	733	52%	48%	0.14%	25.92%	0.68%	–	73.26%
2002-03	789	51%	49%	0.25%	24.33%	0.25%	–	75.16%

== Accountability statistics ==
	2006-07	2005-06	2004-05	2003-04	2002-03
District Accreditation Status	Accredited	Accredited	Accredited	Accredited	Accredited
School Performance Classifications
Level 5 (Superior Performing) Schools	2	2	1	2	1
Level 4 (Exemplary) Schools	0	0	1	0	1
Level 3 (Successful) Schools	0	0	0	0	0
Level 2 (Under Performing) Schools	0	0	0	0	0
Level 1 (Low Performing) Schools	0	0	0	0	0
Not Assigned	0	0	0	0	0

== Notable alumni ==
JaCoby Jones, professional baseball player

== See also ==
- List of school districts in Mississippi
