= Greene County School District (Mississippi) =

School district in Mississippi

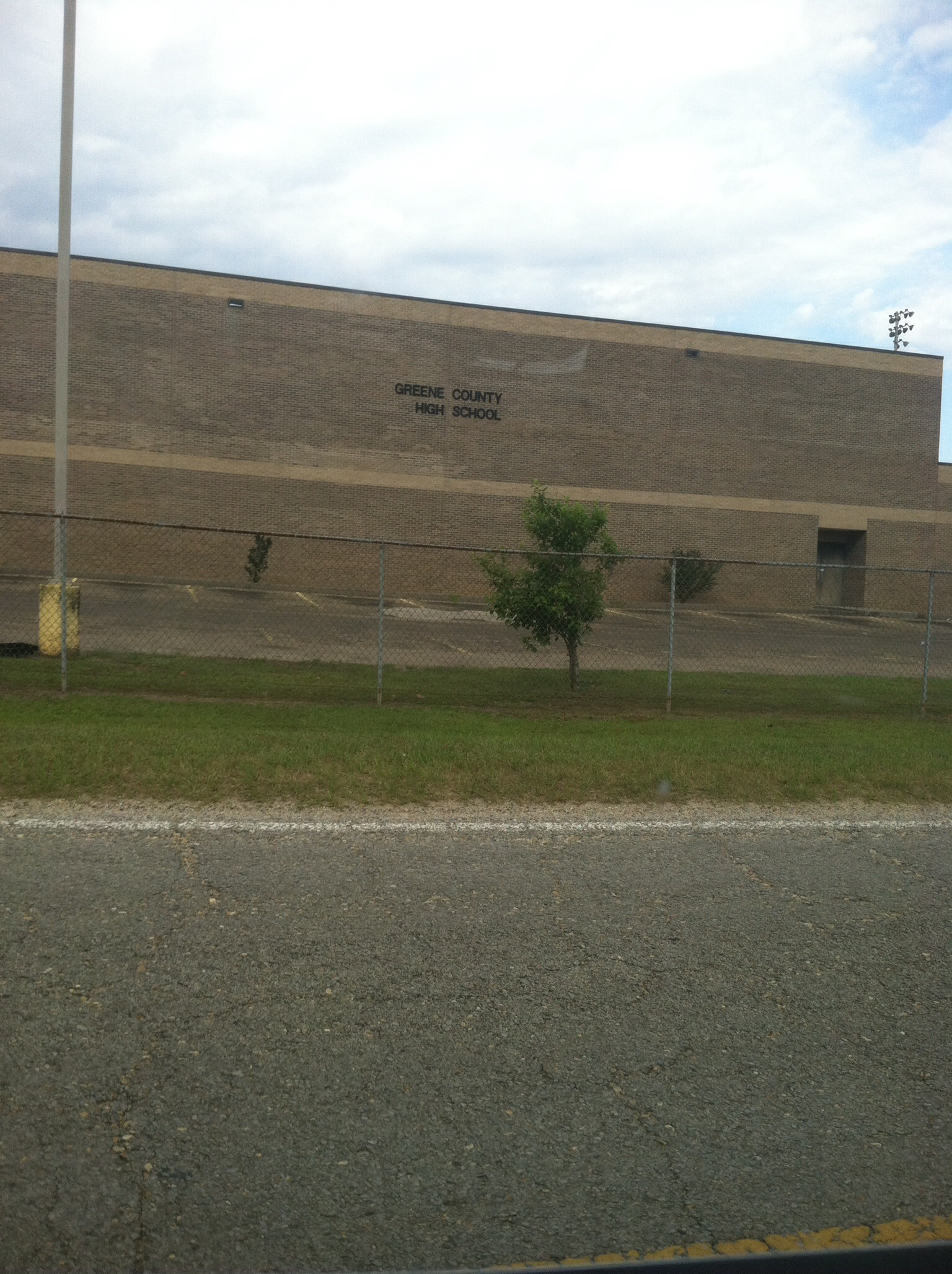
Greene County High School

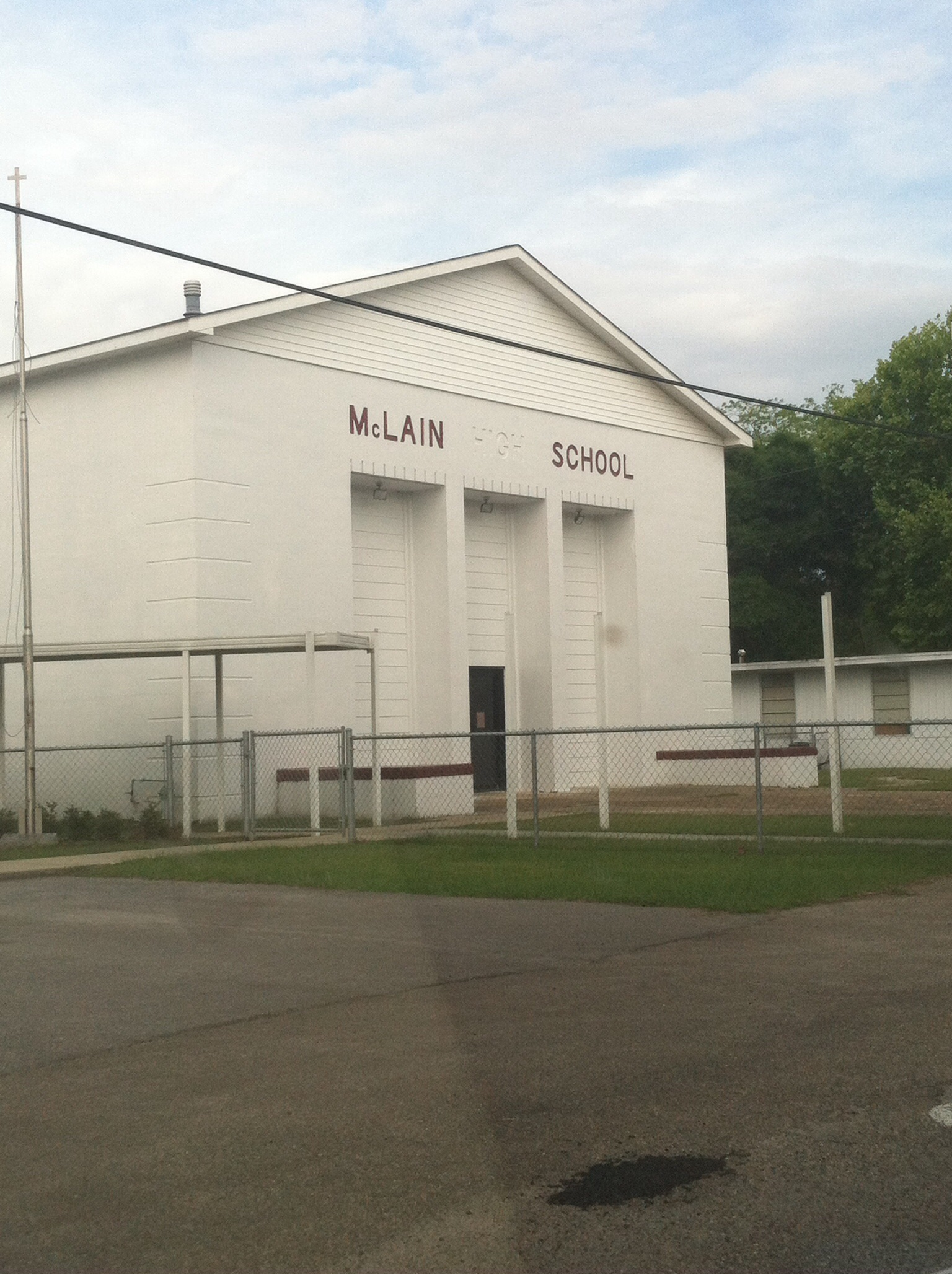
McLain Attendance Center

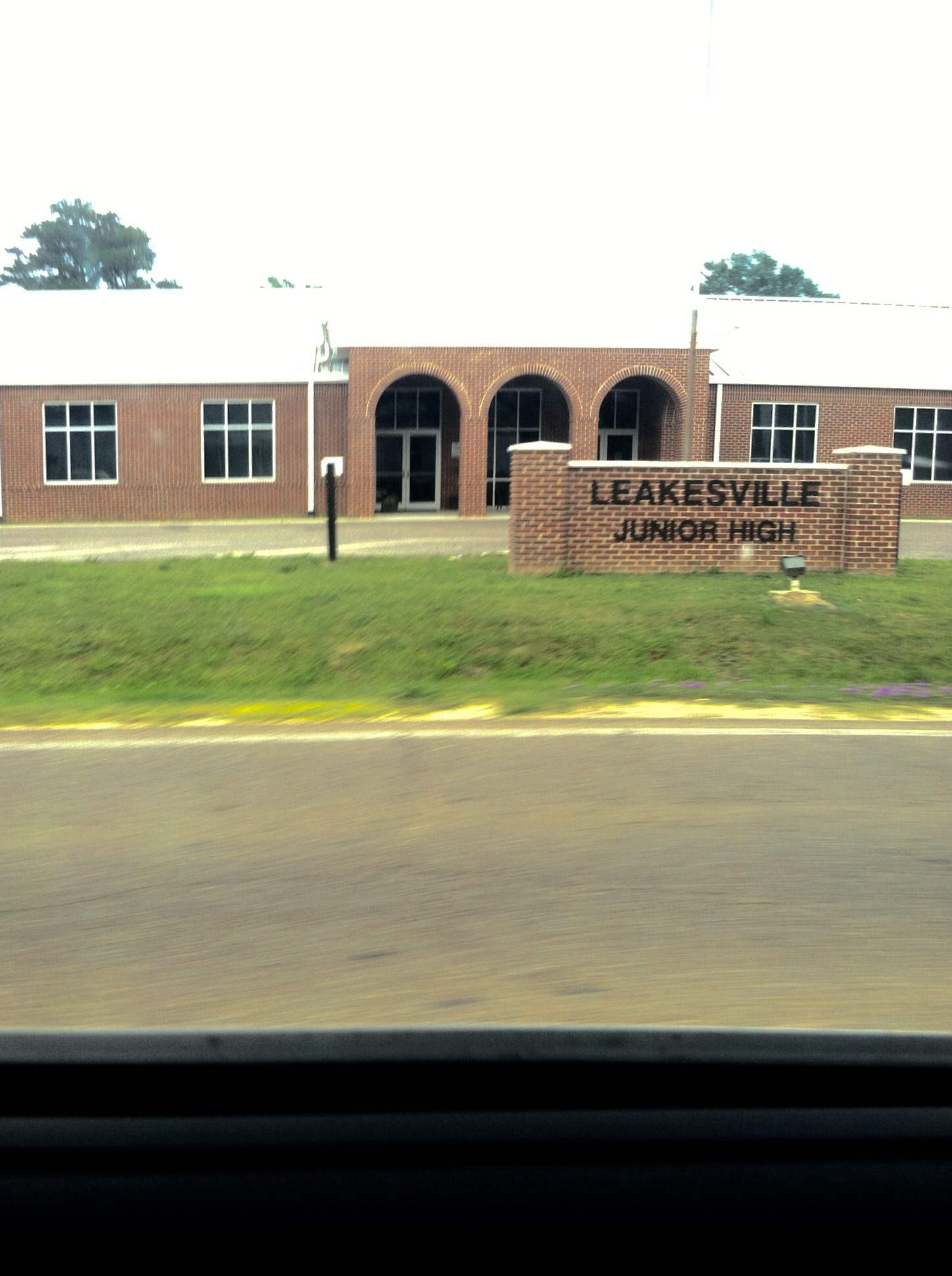
Leakesville Junior High School

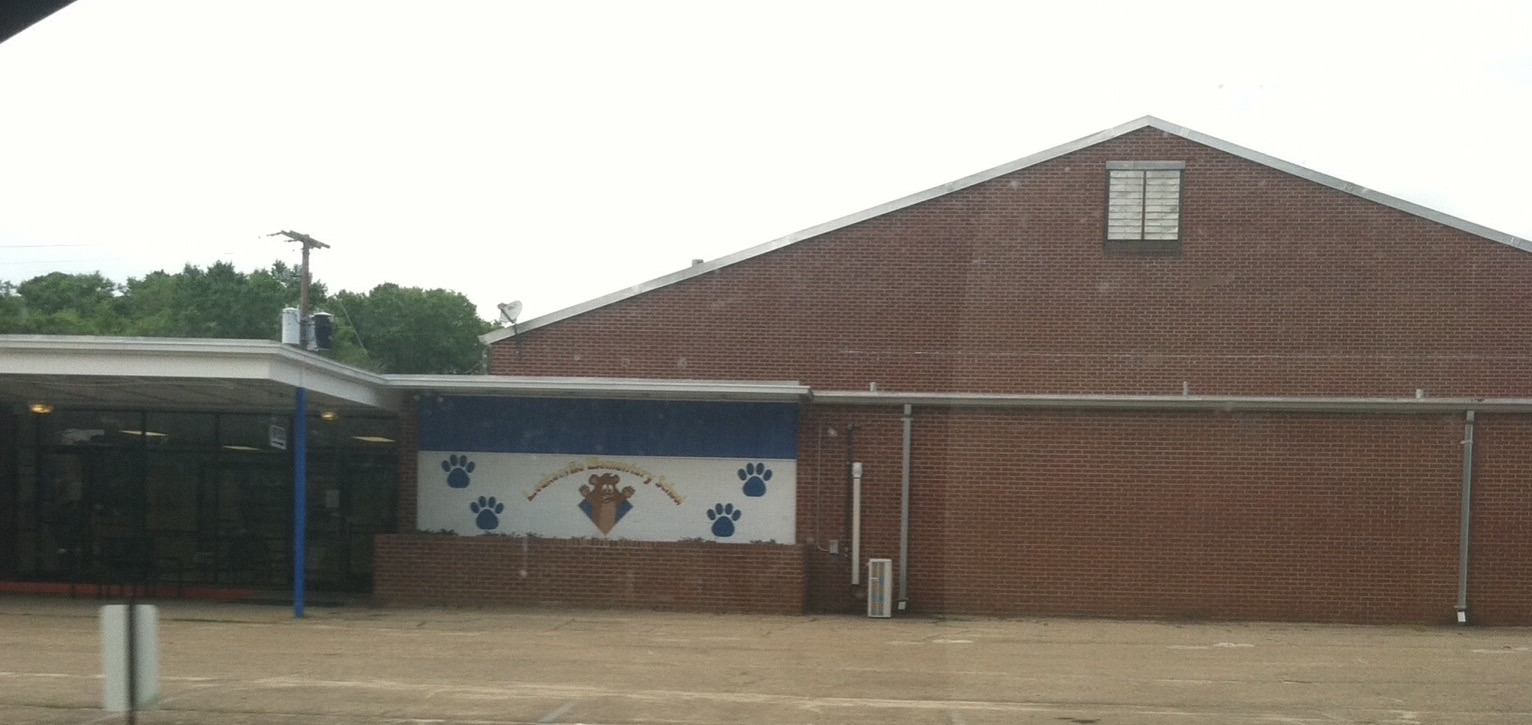
Leakesville Elementary School

The Greene County School District is a public school district based in Leakesville, Mississippi (USA). The district's boundaries parallel that of Greene County.

== Schools ==
- Greene County High School
  - In 2018, a judge accepted an agreement for Leakesville to annex multiple areas, including Greene County HS.
- Leakesville Junior High School
- Leakesville Elementary School
- McLain Attendance Center - McLain
- Sand Hill Elementary School

== Demographics ==
=== 2006-07 school year ===
There were a total of 2,013 students enrolled in the Greene County School District during the 2006–2007 school year. The gender makeup of the district was 51% female and 49% male. The racial makeup of the district was 18.28% African American, 81.57% White, and 0.15% Hispanic. 62.9% of the district's students were eligible to receive free lunch.

=== Previous school years ===
School Year	Enrollment	Gender Makeup		Racial Makeup				
School Year	Enrollment	Female	Male	Asian	African American	Hispanic	Native American	White
2005-06	2,034	50%	50%	0.10%	19.27%	0.15%	–	80.48%
2004-05	2,025	50%	50%	0.15%	19.46%	0.15%	–	80.25%
2003-04	1,949	51%	49%	0.15%	19.81%	0.05%	–	79.99%
2002-03	1,910	50%	50%	0.16%	21.26%	0.05%	–	78.53%

== Accountability statistics ==
	2006-07	2005-06	2004-05	2003-04	2002-03
District Accreditation Status	Accredited	Accredited	Accredited	Accredited	Accredited
School Performance Classifications
Level 5 (Superior Performing) Schools	0	0	3	4	1
Level 4 (Exemplary) Schools	4	5	2	1	2
Level 3 (Successful) Schools	1	0	0	0	2
Level 2 (Under Performing) Schools	0	0	0	0	0
Level 1 (Low Performing) Schools	0	0	0	0	0
Not Assigned	0	0	0	0	0

== See also ==
- List of school districts in Mississippi
