= Arkabutla Creek =

Stream in Mississippi, U.S.

Coordinates: 34°34′58″N 90°13′15″W

Arkabutla Creek is a stream in the U.S. state of Mississippi. It is a tributary to the Coldwater River.

Arkabutla is a name derived from the Choctaw language.
