= Strayhorn, Mississippi =

Unincorporated community in Mississippi, US

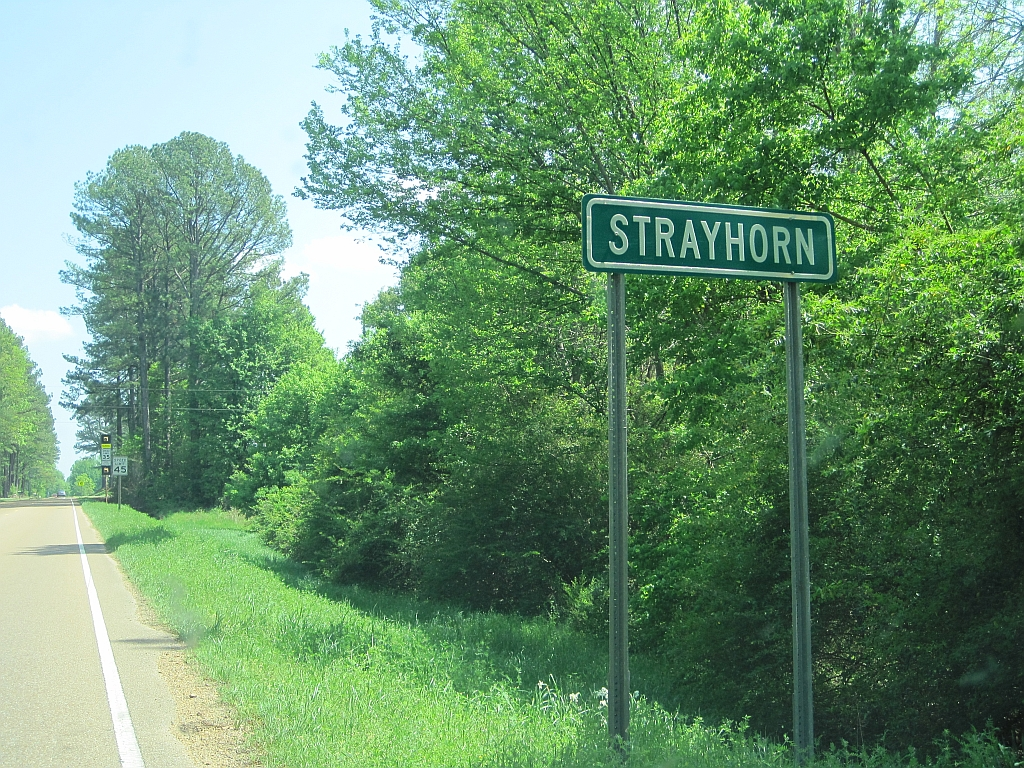
Strayhorn road sign

Strayhorn is a census-designated place (CDP) and unincorporated community along Mississippi Highway 4 in rural western Tate County, Mississippi, United States. Strayhorn is located in the Memphis Metropolitan Area. At the 2000 census, the community had a population of 1,784. Strayhorn has a few businesses, including Hudspeth's Grocery, the Strayhorn Snack Bar, and a Dollar General store. Strayhorn Baptist Church is located in the community.

Per the 2020 Census, the population was 284.

== Geography ==
Strayhorn is approximately 10 miles west of the county seat of Senatobia. Its elevation is 276 feet (84 m), and it is located at 34°37′15″N 90°09′06″W.

== History ==
Strayhorn became an incorporated town in 1900 and remained incorporated for nearly eight years. Strayhorn's first mayor was Frank Bizzell, and F. E. Cotton was the first postmaster at Strayhorn's U.S. Post Office, which was closed in the 1960s when mail delivery was merged with the Senatobia post office. The Strayhorn community is now served by the Sarah post office.

Even after Strayhorn lost its short-lived incorporated status, the first half of the 20th century saw progress for the small community. In 1932, a drainage canal was dug, which converted nontillable land into land fit for farming. Seven years later, the first electric lights came to Strayhorn, and 1953 saw the construction of a paved highway through the community.

== Education ==
It is in the Tate County School District.

Strayhorn is home to Strayhorn Elementary School and the recently added Strayhorn High School. The Strayhorn High School sports teams are known as the Mustangs, and the school's colors are red and blue.

== Demographics ==
Historical population
Census	Pop.	Note	%±
2020	284		—
U.S. Decennial Census; 2020

Strayhorn was first listed as a census designated place in the 2020 U.S. census.

=== 2020 census ===
Strayhorn CDP, Mississippi – Racial and ethnic composition Note: the US Census treats Hispanic/Latino as an ethnic category. This table excludes Latinos from the racial categories and assigns them to a separate category. Hispanics/Latinos may be of any race.
Race / Ethnicity (NH = Non-Hispanic)	Pop 2020	% 2020
White alone (NH)	252	88.73%
Black or African American alone (NH)	6	2.11%
Native American or Alaska Native alone (NH)	0	0.00%
Asian alone (NH)	1	0.35%
Pacific Islander alone (NH)	0	0.00%
Some Other Race alone (NH)	0	0.00%
Mixed Race or Multi-Racial (NH)	13	4.58%
Hispanic or Latino (any race)	12	4.23%
Total	284	100.00%
