= New Albany School District =

School district in Mississippi

The New Albany School District is a public school district based in New Albany, Mississippi (USA).

The district includes almost all of New Albany and some unincorporated areas.

== Schools ==
- New Albany High School (Formerly W. P. Daniel High School, opened 1962)
- New Albany Middle School
- New Albany Elementary School

== Demographics ==
=== 2006-07 school year ===
There were a total of 2,201 students enrolled in the New Albany School District during the 2006–2007 school year. The gender makeup of the district was 48% female and 52% male. The racial makeup of the district was 34.58% African American, 58.75% White, 5.95% Hispanic, and 0.73% Asian. 45.6% of the district's students were eligible to receive free lunch.

=== Previous school years ===
School Year	Enrollment	Gender Makeup		Racial Makeup				
School Year	Enrollment	Female	Male	Asian	African American	Hispanic	Native American	White
2005-06	2,109	48%	52%	0.33%	36.23%	4.74%	–	58.70%
2004-05	2,060	48%	52%	0.34%	35.05%	4.66%	–	59.95%
2003-04	2,034	48%	52%	0.15%	35.30%	4.28%	–	60.28%
2002-03	2,026	48%	52%	0.15%	36.48%	3.90%	–	59.48%

== Accountability statistics ==
	2006-07	2005-06	2004-05	2003-04	2002-03
District Accreditation Status	Accredited	Accredited	Accredited	Accredited	Accredited
School Performance Classifications
Level 5 (Superior Performing) Schools	3	3	2	3	1
Level 4 (Exemplary) Schools	0	0	1	0	2
Level 3 (Successful) Schools	0	0	0	0	0
Level 2 (Under Performing) Schools	0	0	0	0	0
Level 1 (Low Performing) Schools	0	0	0	0	0
Not Assigned	0	0	0	0	0

== See also ==
- List of school districts in Mississippi
