= Union Public School District (Mississippi) =

School district in Mississippi

The Union Public School District is a public school district based in Union, Mississippi (USA).

The district covers south central Neshoba and northwestern Newton counties.

== Schools ==
The district operates a single school that is split into three campuses – Elementary, Middle, and High.

== Demographics ==
=== 2006-07 school year ===
There were a total of 917 students enrolled in the Union Public School District during the 2006–2007 school year. The gender makeup of the district was 50% female and 50% male. The racial makeup of the district was 28.03% African American, 70.82% White, 0.65% Hispanic, 0.22% Asian, and 0.22% Native American. 49.3% of the district's students were eligible to receive free lunch.

=== Previous school years ===
School Year	Enrollment	Gender Makeup		Racial Makeup				
School Year	Enrollment	Female	Male	Asian	African American	Hispanic	Native American	White
2005-06	895	48%	52%	–	30.39%	0.34%	0.22%	69.05%
2004-05	850	50%	50%	–	29.65%	0.71%	0.12%	69.53%
2003-04	839	51%	49%	–	30.15%	0.60%	0.12%	69.13%
2002-03	831	51%	49%	–	29.24%	0.96%	0.60%	69.19%

== Accountability statistics ==
	2006-07	2005-06	2004-05	2003-04	2002-03
District Accreditation Status	Accredited	Accredited	Accredited	Accredited	Accredited
School Performance Classifications
Level 5 (Superior Performing) Schools	0	1	1	1	0
Level 4 (Exemplary) Schools	1	0	0	0	1
Level 3 (Successful) Schools	0	0	0	0	0
Level 2 (Under Performing) Schools	0	0	0	0	0
Level 1 (Low Performing) Schools	0	0	0	0	0
Not Assigned	0	0	0	0	0

== See also ==
- List of school districts in Mississippi
