= Cottonville, Mississippi =

- Unincorporated community
- Location within Mississippi Location within the United States
- Coordinates: 34°39′34″N 90°11′05″W
- Country: United States
- State: Mississippi
- County: Tate
- Elevation: 223 ft (68 m)
- Time zone: UTC-6 (Central (CST))
  - Summer (DST): UTC-5 (CDT)
- Area code: 662
- GNIS feature ID: 683411

Cottonville (also Cottonville Store) is an unincorporated community in Tate County, Mississippi, United States.
