= Lincoln County School District (Mississippi) =

School district in Mississippi

Coordinates: 31.579094°N 90.439458°W

The Lincoln County School District is a public school district based in Lincoln County, Mississippi (USA). The superintendent is Mickey Myers.

The district includes Bogue Chitto and the Lincoln County portion of Wesson.

== Schools ==
- Bogue Chitto Attendance Center (Grades K-12)
- Enterprise Attendance Center (Grades K-12) Web Site
- Loyd Star Attendance Center (Grades K-12) Web Site
- West Lincoln Attendance Center (Grades K-12) Web Site

== Demographics ==
=== 2006-07 school year ===
There were a total of 2,983 students enrolled in the Lincoln County School District during the 2006–2007 school year. The gender makeup of the district was 48% female and 52% male. The racial makeup of the district was 16.53% African American, 83.00% White, 0.23% Hispanic, 0.17% Asian, and 0.07% Native American. 38.0% of the district's students were eligible to receive free lunch.

=== Previous school years ===
School Year	Enrollment	Gender Makeup		Racial Makeup				
School Year	Enrollment	Female	Male	Asian	African American	Hispanic	Native American	White
2005-06	3,017	49%	51%	0.17%	16.37%	0.20%	0.10%	83.16%
2004-05	2,959	48%	52%	0.10%	16.56%	0.24%	0.07%	83.03%
2003-04	2,867	47%	53%	0.17%	16.11%	0.28%	0.07%	83.36%
2002-03	2,826	48%	52%	0.18%	16.53%	0.42%	0.07%	82.80%

== Accountability statistics ==
	2006-07	2005-06	2004-05	2003-04	2002-03
District Accreditation Status	Accredited	Accredited	Accredited	Accredited	Accredited
School Performance Classifications
Level 5 (Superior Performing) Schools	1	1	1	1	1
Level 4 (Exemplary) Schools	3	3	2	3	3
Level 3 (Successful) Schools	0	0	1	0	0
Level 2 (Under Performing) Schools	0	0	0	0	0
Level 1 (Low Performing) Schools	0	0	0	0	0
Not Assigned	0	0	0	0	0

== See also ==
- List of school districts in Mississippi
