= Hazlehurst City School District =

School district in Mississippi, United States

Address
- 119 Robert McDaniel Drive Hazlehurst, Mississippi, 39083; United States

District information
- Type: Public
- Grades: PK–13
- Schools: 3
- NCES District ID: 2801830

Students and staff
- Students: 1,320 (2024–2025)
- Teachers: 87.00 (on an FTE basis) (2024–2025)
- Staff: 104.80 (on an FTE basis) (2024–2025)
- Student–teacher ratio: 15.17 (2024–2025)

The Hazlehurst City School District is a public school district based in Hazlehurst, Mississippi, United States. The 3 schools are Hazlehurst Elementary, Hazlehurst Middle and Hazlehurst High.

== History ==
In 2008, the Mississippi state government assumed management of the district due to poor performance. Jackie Mader of The Hechinger Report stated that the district "was in chaos and suffering from abysmal academic performance". Circa 2014 the state was planning to allow an elected school board to once again assume control. According to Mader, academic performance had improved during the state takeover period, but there were "inconsistent and often lackluster results".

== Demographics ==
=== 2006-07 school year ===
There were a total of 1,174 students enrolled in the Hazlehurst City School District during the 2006–2007 school year. The gender makeup of the district was 49% female and 51% male. The racial makeup of the district was 95.74% African American, 1.23% White, 2.92% Hispanic, and 0.12% Asian. 85.3% of the district's students were eligible to receive free lunch.

=== Previous school years ===
School year	Enrollment	Gender makeup		Racial makeup				
School year	Enrollment	Female	Male	Asian	African American	Hispanic	Native American	White
2005-06	1,805	50%	50%	0.17%	95.96%	2.49%	–	1.39%
2004-05	1,710	49%	51%	0.18%	95.32%	2.40%	–	2.11%
2003-04	1,712	48%	52%	0.23%	95.62%	2.10%	–	2.04%
2002-03	1,707	48%	52%	0.18%	96.49%	1.46%	–	1.87%

== Accountability statistics ==
	2006-07	2005-06	2004-05	2003-04	2002-03
District accreditation status	Advised	Accredited	Advised	Accredited	Accredited
School performance classifications
Level 5 (Superior Performing) Schools	0	0	0	0	0
Level 4 (Exemplary) Schools	0	0	0	1	0
Level 3 (Successful) Schools	0	1	2	1	0
Level 2 (Under Performing) Schools	3	2	0	0	1
Level 1 (Low Performing) Schools	0	0	0	0	0
Not assigned	0	0	0	0	1

== See also ==
- List of school districts in Mississippi
