= Alcorn School District =

School district in Mississippi, United States

The Alcorn School District is a public school district based in Alcorn County, Mississippi (USA). The district includes the county except for areas in Corinth and some areas around Corinth.

The district serves the towns of Farmington, Kossuth, Glen, and Rienzi as well as unincorporated areas of Alcorn County. This district was awarded the "A" rated status by the Mississippi Department of Education in the 2019-2020 school year and has continued to maintain that status.

The Alcorn School District operates ten schools - three high schools, two middle schools, three elementary schools, one vocational school, and one alternative school. The Alcorn School District has a district wide 94.7% graduation rate, 68.2% post-secondary school enrollment, and $9,006.83 per pupil in overall expenditures according to the MDE 2019-2020 District Report Card.

Brandon Quinn serves as the Superintendent of Education for the Alcorn School District. He began his service as Superintendent in January 2021 after serving as Alcorn Central High School principal for six and a half years. Angela Harris serves as Assistant Superintendent of Education. She was formerly the Principal of Falkner Elementary School and Federal Programs Director of North Tippah School District in Tipplersville, Mississippi.

== Schools ==
7-12 schools

- Biggersville High School (Grades 7-12)

High schools

- Alcorn Central High School (Grades 9-12)
- Kossuth High School (Grades 9-12)

Middle schools

- Alcorn Central Middle School (Grades 5-8)
- Kossuth Middle School (Grades 5-8)

Elementary schools

- Alcorn Central Elementary School (Grades K-4)
- Biggersville Elementary School (Grades K-6)
- Kossuth Elementary School (Grades K-4)

Other Campuses

- Alcorn Career & Technology Center
- Alcorn Alternative Education Center

== Demographics ==
=== Student Demographics (2020-2021) ===
The student body at the schools served by Alcorn School District is 92.4% White, 3.4% Black, 0.2% Asian or Asian/Pacific Islander, 0.9% Hispanic/Latino, 0.3% American Indian or Alaska Native, and 0% Native Hawaiian or other Pacific Islander. In addition, 2.7% of students are two or more races, and 0% have not specified their race or ethnicity.

Also, 49% of students are female, and 51% of students are male. At schools in Alcorn School District, 51.6% of students are eligible to participate in the federal free and reduced price meal program and 0.7% of students are English language learners.

=== Previous school years ===
School Year	Enrollment	Gender Makeup		Racial Makeup				
School Year	Enrollment	Female	Male	Asian	African American	Hispanic	Native American	White
2005-06	3,815	47%	53%	0.18%	4.04%	0.63%	0.05%	95.10%
2004-05	3,797	48%	52%	0.13%	3.87%	0.47%	0.03%	95.50%
2003-04	3,779	48%	52%	0.24%	4.15%	0.64%	0.03%	94.95%
2002-03	3,798	48%	52%	0.24%	4.13%	0.66%	0.03%	94.94%

== Accountability statistics ==
	2006-07	2005-06	2004-05	2003-04	2002-03
District Accreditation Status	Accredited	Accredited	Accredited	Accredited	Accredited
School Performance Classifications
Level 5 (Superior Performing) Schools	0	0	2	2	2
Level 4 (Exemplary) Schools	4	4	5	4	4
Level 3 (Successful) Schools	5	6	3	4	3
Level 2 (Under Performing) Schools	1	0	0	0	0
Level 1 (Low Performing) Schools	0	0	0	0	0
Not Assigned	0	0	0	0	0

== See also ==
- List of school districts in Mississippi
