= Jefferson Davis County School District =

School district in Mississippi

Coordinates: 31.601098°N 89.865861°W

Jefferson Davis County High School

Location
- 891 Bass Burkett Road; Bassfield, (Jefferson Davis County), Mississippi 39421; United States

Information
- Type: Public high school
- Principal: Dr. Spurgeon Banyard
- Staff: 27.00 (FTE)
- Enrollment: 392 (2023-24)
- Student to teacher ratio: 14.52
- Colors: Blue, silver, and black
- Nickname: Jaguars
- Website: Jefferson Davis County High School

The Jefferson Davis County School District is a public school district based in Prentiss, Mississippi (USA). The district's boundaries parallel that of Jefferson Davis County.

== Schools ==
Secondary schools

- Jefferson Davis County High School (JDC High School) opened in 2017. It now serves as the only high school in the county after the school closings of Prentiss High School and Bassfield High School at the end of the 2016–17 school year. It operates out of the former Bassfield High School. Silver and blue are the school colors and jaguars are the school mascot. Almost 90 percent of its students are African American and 99 percent are categorized as economically disadvantaged.
- Jefferson Davis County Jr. High School. Started in the 2017–18 school year, it now serves as the only junior high school after the school closings of Prentiss High School and Bassfield High School at the end of the 2016–17 school year. It operates out of the former Prentiss High School.

Elementary schools

- G.W. Carver Elementary School (Bassfield)
- J.E. Johnson Elementary School (Prentiss)

== Demographics ==
=== 2006-07 school year ===
There were a total of 2,035 students enrolled in the Jefferson Davis County School District during the 2006–2007 school year. The gender makeup of the district was 48% female and 52% male. The racial makeup of the district was 88.65% African American, 11.06% White, 0.15% Hispanic, and 0.15% Asian. 99.9% of the district's students were eligible to receive free lunch.

=== Previous school years ===
| School Year | Enrollment | Gender Makeup | | Racial Makeup | | | | |
| School Year | Enrollment | Female | Male | Asian | African American | Hispanic | Native American | White |
|---|---|---|---|---|---|---|---|---|
| 2005-06 | 2,135 | 48% | 52% | 0.14% | 87.40% | 0.09% | 0.05% | 12.32% |
| 2004-05 | 2,178 | 47% | 53% | 0.14% | 87.60% | 0.05% | 0.05% | 12.17% |
| 2003-04 | 2,273 | 47% | 53% | 0.09% | 87.11% | 0.04% | 0.04% | 12.71% |
| 2002-03 | 2,320 | 48% | 52% | 0.17% | 86.21% | – | – | 13.62% |

== Accountability statistics ==
| | 2006-07 | 2005-06 | 2004-05 | 2003-04 | 2002-03 |
|---|---|---|---|---|---|
| District Accreditation Status | Probation | Accredited | Accredited | Accredited | Accredited |
School Performance Classifications
| Level 5 (Superior Performing) Schools | 0 | 0 | 0 | 0 | 0 |
| Level 4 (Exemplary) Schools | 0 | 0 | 0 | 0 | 0 |
| Level 3 (Successful) Schools | 1 | 3 | 2 | 2 | 1 |
| Level 2 (Under Performing) Schools | 3 | 1 | 2 | 2 | 3 |
| Level 1 (Low Performing) Schools | 0 | 0 | 0 | 0 | 0 |
| Not Assigned | 0 | 0 | 0 | 0 | 0 |

== See also ==
- List of school districts in Mississippi
