= Enterprise School District (Mississippi) =

School district in Mississippi, United States

Enterprise School District is a public school district based in Enterprise, Mississippi, U.S.A.

The district includes sections of northern Clarke County, including Enterprise.

== Schools ==
- Enterprise High School
- Enterprise Middle School
- Enterprise Elementary School

== Demographics ==
=== 2006-07 school year ===
There were a total of around 903 students enrolled in the Enterprise School District during the 2006–2007 school year. The gender makeup of the district was 50% female and 50% male. The racial makeup of the district was 11.41% African American, 86.71% White, 1.55% Hispanic, 0.22% Native American, and 0.11% Asian. 35.4% of the district's students were eligible to receive free lunch.

=== Previous school years ===
School Year	Enrollment	Gender Makeup		Racial Makeup				
School Year	Enrollment	Female	Male	Asian	African American	Hispanic	Native American	White
2005-06	873	50%	50%	–	11.23%	1.37%	0.23%	87.17%
2004-05	873	49%	51%	0.23%	12.03%	1.03%	0.23%	86.48%
2003-04	869	50%	50%	0.23%	14.61%	0.35%	0.23%	84.58%
2002-03	907	49	51	0.33%	15.99%	0.77%	0.11%	82.80%

== Accountability statistics ==
	2006-07	2005-06	2004-05	2003-04	2002-03
District Accreditation Status	Accredited	Accredited	Accredited	Accredited	Accredited
School Performance Classifications
Level 5 (Superior Performing) Schools	3	3	3	3	2
Level 4 (Exemplary) Schools	0	0	0	0	1
Level 3 (Successful) Schools	0	0	0	0	0
Level 2 (Under Performing) Schools	0	0	0	0	0
Level 1 (Low Performing) Schools	0	0	0	0	0
Not Assigned	0	0	0	0	0

== See also ==
- List of school districts in Mississippi
