= Newton Municipal School District =

School district in Mississippi

The Newton Municipal School District is a public school district based in Newton, Mississippi (USA).

In addition to Newton, it includes a small portion of Lake.

== Schools ==
- Newton High School
- N. H. Pilate Middle School
- Newton Elementary School
- Newton Career Center

== Demographics ==
=== 2024–25 school year ===
According to the National Center for Education Statistics, Newton Municipal School District enrolled 782 students during the 2024–25 school year. The district employed 63.5 full-time-equivalent classroom teachers, resulting in a student–teacher ratio of approximately 12.3 to 1.

=== 2006–07 school year ===
There were a total of 1,046 students enrolled in the Newton Municipal School District during the 2006–2007 school year. The gender makeup of the district was 48% female and 52% male. The racial makeup of the district was 90.54% African American, 9.08% White, 0.10% Hispanic, and 0.29% Asian. 76.2% of the district's students were eligible to receive free lunch.

=== Historical school years ===
School Year	Enrollment	Gender Makeup		Racial Makeup				
School Year	Enrollment	Female	Male	Asian	African American	Hispanic	Native American	White
2006–07	1,046	48%	52%	0.29%	90.54%	0.10%	—	9.08%
2005–06	1,081	48%	52%	0.19%	90.19%	0.09%	–	9.53%
2004–05	1,048	49%	51%	–	87.31%	–	–	12.69%
2003–04	1,047	49%	51%	0.19%	87.58%	–	–	12.23%
2002–03	1,129	49%	51%	–	81.67%	0.27%	0.09%	17.98%

== Accountability statistics ==
	2006–07	2005–06	2004–05	2003–04	2002–03
District Accreditation Status	Accredited	Accredited	Accredited	Accredited	Accredited
School Performance Classifications
Level 5 (Superior Performing) Schools	0	1	0	0	0
Level 4 (Exemplary) Schools	0	0	1	0	0
Level 3 (Successful) Schools	3	2	2	3	3
Level 2 (Under Performing) Schools	0	0	0	0	0
Level 1 (Low Performing) Schools	0	0	0	0	0
Not Assigned	0	0	0	0	0

== See also ==
- List of school districts in Mississippi
