= Smith County School District =

School district in Mississippi

Address
- 212 Sylvarena Avenue Suite C Raleigh, Mississippi, 39153; United States
- Coordinates: 32.032689°N 89.521694°W

District information
- Type: Public
- Grades: PK–13
- Schools: 8
- NCES District ID: 2804020

Students and staff
- Students: 2,538 (2025–2026)
- Teachers: 185.45 (on an FTE basis) (2025–2026)
- Staff: 164.52 (on an FTE basis) (2025–2026)
- Student–teacher ratio: 13.69 (2025–2026)

Other information
- Website: www.smithcountyschools.net

The Smith County School District is a public school district based in Raleigh, Mississippi (USA). The district's boundaries parallel that of Smith County.

== Schools ==
- Raleigh Elementary School (K-6)
- Raleigh High School (7-12)
- Taylorsville Attendance Center (K-12)
- Mize Attendance Center (K-12)
- Smith County Career Center

== Demographics ==
=== 2006-07 school year ===
There were a total of 3,125 students enrolled in the Smith County School District during the 2006–2007 school year. The gender makeup of the district was 48% female and 52% male. The racial makeup of the district was 32.45% African American, 66.43% White, 0.96% Hispanic, 0.10% Native American, and 0.06% Asian. 50.2% of the district's students were eligible to receive free lunch.

=== Previous school years ===
School Year	Enrollment	Gender Makeup		Racial Makeup				
School Year	Enrollment	Female	Male	Asian	African American	Hispanic	Native American	White
2005-06	3,149	49%	51%	0.06%	33.03%	0.51%	0.03%	66.37%
2004-05	3,091	49%	51%	0.03%	32.38%	0.29%	0.03%	67.26%
2003-04	3,103	48%	52%	0.10%	32.16%	0.26%	0.03%	67.45%
2002-03	3,077	48%	52%	0.10%	31.85%	0.39%	0.03%	67.63%

== Accountability statistics ==
	2006-07	2005-06	2004-05	2003-04	2002-03
District Accreditation Status	Accredited	Accredited	Accredited	Accredited	Accredited
School Performance Classifications
Level 5 (Superior Performing) Schools	1	0	0	0	0
Level 4 (Exemplary) Schools	2	2	3	4	3
Level 3 (Successful) Schools	1	2	1	0	1
Level 2 (Under Performing) Schools	0	0	0	0	0
Level 1 (Low Performing) Schools	0	0	0	0	0
Not Assigned	0	0	0	0	0

== See also ==
- List of school districts in Mississippi
