= Baldwyn School District =

School district in Mississippi

Address
- 107 West Main Street Baldwyn, Mississippi; United States

District information
- Schools: 3
- NCES District ID: 2800540

Students and staff
- Students: 772
- Teachers: 63.98 FTE

Other information
- Website: https://baldwynschools.com/

The Baldwyn School District is a public school district based in Baldwyn, Mississippi (USA).

The district covers southwestern Prentiss and northern Lee counties.

== Schools ==
- Baldwyn High School (Grades 9-12)
- Baldwyn Middle School (Grades 5-8)
- Baldwyn Elementary School (Grades K-4)

== Demographics ==
=== 2006-07 school year ===
There were a total of 942 students enrolled in the Baldwyn School District during the 2006–2007 school year. The gender makeup of the district was 46% female and 54% male. The racial makeup of the district was 51.91% White, 47.24% Black, 0.74% Hispanic, and 0.11% Asian. 57.0% of the district's students were eligible to receive free lunch.

=== Previous school years ===
School Year	Enrollment	Gender Makeup		Racial Makeup				
School Year	Enrollment	Female	Male	Asian	Black	Hispanic	American Indian	White
2005-06	951	46%	54%	0.21%	46.79%	0.62%	–	52.37%
2004-05	967	47%	53%	0.11%	46.85%	0.62%	–	52.43%
2003-04	975	48%	52%	–	44.41%	0.31%	–	55.28%
2002-03	997	48%	52%	–	45.24%	0.20%	–	54.56%

== Accountability statistics ==
	2006-07	2005-06	2004-05	2003-04	2002-03
District Accreditation Status	Accredited	Accredited	Accredited	Accredited	Accredited
School Performance Classifications
Level 5 (Superior Performing) Schools	0	1	1	2	0
Level 4 (Exemplary) Schools	3	0	0	0	2
Level 3 (Successful) Schools	0	2	2	1	1
Level 2 (Under Performing) Schools	0	0	0	0	0
Level 1 (Low Performing) Schools	0	0	0	0	0
Not Assigned	0	0	0	0	0

== Notable alumni ==
- Laura Pendergest-Holt - Chief investment officer of the Stanford Financial Group
