= University of Mississippi High School =

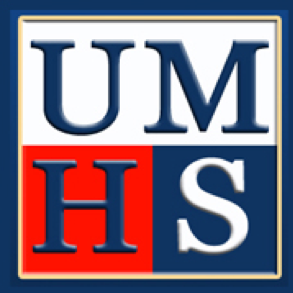

Location
- PO Box 1848; University, Mississippi 38677; United States

Information
- Other name: UMHS
- Former name: UM Independent Study High School
- School type: Private, Online
- Founded: 2003
- CEEB code: 253069
- Faculty: 30
- Grades: 7 - 12
- Enrollment: 301
- International students: 2%
- Student to teacher ratio: 10:1
- Classes offered: Special Needs Accessible, College Prep, Advanced Placement, Dual Credit
- Schedule type: Asynchronous
- Accreditation: AdvancED-SACS, NCAA
- Affiliation: MAIS, ADEIL
- Clubs: National Honor Society
- Graduation Rate: 95.3%
- Website: http://www.outreach.olemiss.edu/umhs/index.html

The University of Mississippi High School is an accredited, comprehensive, online high school operated by the Office of Pre-College Programs in the Division of Outreach and Continuing Education at the University of Mississippi. It offers online classes for students in grades 7 through 12, allowing students to earn high school Carnegie units, dual credit through the university, and a high school diploma from anywhere in the United States or the world.

== History ==
The University of Mississippi High School was created in the Division of Outreach as The University of Mississippi Independent Study High School in 2003 as an alternative program to the traditional paper-based correspondence program, going completely online by 2008. Over time, UMHS added core and elective classes to its course offerings. In 2010, UMHS received AdvancED-SACS accreditation, and in 2013 held its first face-to-face graduation ceremony. In 2014, the school changed its name to The University of Mississippi High School.

== Today ==
The University of Mississippi High School is an online school that delivers courses asynchronously in the style and format similar to university online courses. Using the online format, students and teachers can access and participate in courses at any time: weekends, holidays, etc. And because the courses are asynchronous, there are no registration deadlines, meaning that students can complete their studies at their own pace. The school welcomes non-traditional students, including homeschool students and adult learners.

Courses are available to meet the needs of a wide variety of learners, including the following: low-enrollment courses, interest-specific electives, college-remedial courses, courses for special needs students, courses for the adult learner, and advanced level courses. Dual enrollment credit is available through the University of Mississippi for qualified students. With courses in Art History, Mythology, Mississippi Writers, African-American Literature, and World Religions, the school offers an interesting array of classes in its college prep curriculum.

== Accreditation and awards ==
Consistently listed among the 50 Best Online High School Diplomas, the University of Mississippi High School is a member of the Mississippi Association of Independent Schools (MAIS), and is fully accredited by AdvancED - Southern Association of Colleges and Schools (SACS). Additionally, the school's core courses are approved by the National Collegiate Athletic Association (NCAA). The school is also a member of the Association for Distance Education and Independent Learning (ADEIL), and its Advanced Placement World History course is the 2018 ADEIL High School Course Award Winner.
