= Mississippi School of the Arts =

Coordinates: 31.580067°N 90.447171°W

Location
- 308 West Cherokee Street; Brookhaven, Mississippi; United States

Information
- Type: Residential Public High School
- Motto: •Imagine • Create • Realize•
- Established: 2003
- Principal: Avery Peagler
- Campus Director: Suzanne Hirsch
- Teaching staff: 12.00 (FTE)
- Grades: 11–12
- Enrollment: 104 (2024-2025)
- Student to teacher ratio: 8.67
- Colors: Red and Black
- Mascot: Phoenix
- Website: www.msabrookhaven.org

The Mississippi School of the Arts (MSA) is an upper high school of literary, visual, filmmaking, and performing arts on the historic Whitworth College Campus in Brookhaven, Mississippi, about sixty miles (97 km) south of Jackson, Mississippi. MSA teaches 11th and 12th grade students. The site has 6 buildings designated as Mississippi Landmarks, and the campus is also notable as being on the U.S. National Register of Historic Places. The renovation or construction of the campus facilities, as a historic site, are ongoing and rely upon additional funding to make capital improvements.

The Mississippi School of the Arts provides advanced programs of study in visual arts, vocal music, theatre, dance, filmmaking, and literary arts for "artistically gifted" 11th/12th grade students from throughout Mississippi, within a residential school. The curriculum at MSA focuses on the arts and humanities. A comprehensive residential and academic curriculum prepares students for further studies or for the pursuit of employment. Some non-arts and required courses (some math, science, etc.) are taught in conjunction with Brookhaven High School, 6 blocks away, to provide a wider curriculum. Students apply for admission during their sophomore year at other schools.

== History ==
At the site of the present MSA campus, Whitworth College (founded 1858) had been a four-year, all-female, Methodist college from 1858 until 1928. At that point, the school became a liberal arts junior college within the Millsaps College System. However, in 1937 (9 years later), support was withdrawn by the Methodist Conference.

The Whitworth College campus area, over the years, has been a Civil War Confederate hospital, then later a junior college with a reputation for performances by major musicians, and also an evening school for veterans who attended college under the G.I. bill.

After the City of Brookhaven donated the campus to the State of Mississippi for the purpose of MSA in 1999, the State of Mississippi funded the restoration of the campus. The campus is now divided into the Historic Upper Campus and the Contemporary Lower Campus. The upper campus includes: Johnson Institute (where classes are now held), Mary Jane Lampton Auditorium (used for productions, meetings, and available to the public for rental), Enochs Hall, Elizabeth Cottage, Cooper Hall, and the Helen Furlow Scruggs Y-Hut. The lower campus consists of the recently constructed Student Life Center, the dormitories, library, digital arts lab, and cafeteria.

MSA had its inaugural class of students on August 3, 2003.

== Arts disciplines ==
Most of the faculty works with the literary, visual, and performing arts, although there are regular academic teachers as well. For classes not offered at MSA, students are either enrolled in online classes or bussed to Brookhaven High.

In the student life center, other staff members have been employed as residential counselors, and food service workers. There are also several employees working in school security.

=== Theatre Arts ===
The Classes Taught in the Department:

-Dramaturgy I & II

-Acting I, II, III, & IV

-Movement for the Actor I & II

-Company I & II

-Theatre Production

=== Visual Arts ===
Drawing I/ Drawing II/ Painting I/ Painting II/ Mixed Media/ Advanced Drawing and Painting/ Advanced Portfolio/ Senior Focus/ Photography/ Digital Arts/ 3D Media/ 2D Media/

=== Literary Arts ===
2007-8 was the first year for the Literary Arts department.

=== Dance Arts ===
Dance was added in the Fall of 2009.

Students learn different styles of dance such as Ballet, Modern, and Improvisation. Students also learn stage production including lights and sound.

=== Media Arts ===
Students can learn to become video and sound engineers, film directors, editors, and production managers.
