= South Tippah School District =

School district in Mississippi

The South Tippah School District is a public school district based in Ripley, Mississippi, United States.

In addition to Ripley, the district also serves the towns of Dumas and Blue Mountain as well as rural areas in southern Tippah County.

== Schools ==
- Ripley High School
- Ripley Middle School
- Ripley Elementary
- Blue Mountain School
- Pine Grove School

== Demographics ==
=== 2006-07 school year ===
There were a total of 2,731 students enrolled in the South Tippah School District during the 2006–2007 school year. The gender makeup of the district was 49% female and 51% male. The racial makeup of the district was 23.69% African American, 70.08% White, 6.15% Hispanic, and 0.07% Asian. 48.2% of the district's students were eligible to receive free lunch.

=== Previous school years ===
School Year	Enrollment	Gender Makeup		Racial Makeup				
School Year	Enrollment	Female	Male	Asian	African American	Hispanic	Native American	White
2005-06	2,818	49%	51%	0.04%	22.82%	5.96%	–	71.19%
2004-05	2,770	49%	51%	0.11%	23.61%	4.95%	–	71.34%
2003-04	2,709	50%	50%	0.15%	23.59%	4.32%	–	71.95%
2002-03	2,715	50%	50%	0.22%	23.94%	4.16%	–	71.68%

== Accountability statistics ==
	2006-07	2005-06	2004-05	2003-04	2002-03
District Accreditation Status	Accredited	Accredited	Accredited	Accredited	Accredited
School Performance Classifications
Level 5 (Superior Performing) Schools	1	1	1	2	1
Level 4 (Exemplary) Schools	4	3	4	2	4
Level 3 (Successful) Schools	0	1	0	1	0
Level 2 (Under Performing) Schools	0	0	0	0	0
Level 1 (Low Performing) Schools	0	0	0	0	0
Not Assigned	0	0	0	0	0

== See also ==
- List of school districts in Mississippi
