= Lauderdale County School District (Mississippi) =

School district in Mississippi, United States

Address
- 301 46th Court Meridian, Mississippi, 39305; United States

District information
- Type: Public
- Grades: K–12
- NCES District ID: 2802430

Students and staff
- Students: 5,680
- Teachers: 425.6
- Staff: 444.32
- Student–teacher ratio: 13.35

Other information
- Website: www.lauderdale.k12.ms.us

The Lauderdale County School District is a public school district based in Lauderdale County, Mississippi (USA).

== Schools ==
- Northeast High School (Grades 9–12)
- Southeast High School (Grades 9–12)
- Northeast Middle School (Grades 5–8)
- Southeast Middle School (Grades 5–8)
- Northeast Elementary School (Grades PK–4)
- Southeast Elementary School (Grades PK–4)
- West Lauderdale Elementary School (Grades K–4)
- Clarkdale Attendance Center (Grades K–12)
- West Lauderdale Attendance Center
  - West Lauderdale High School (Grades 9–12)
  - West Lauderdale Middle School (Grades 5–8)

== Demographics ==
=== 2006-07 school year ===
There were a total of 6,528 students enrolled in the Lauderdale County School District during the 2006–2007 school year. The gender makeup of the district was 47% female and 53% male. The racial makeup of the district was 67.97% Caucasian, 30.36% African American, 1.12% Hispanic, 0.51% Asian, and 0.05% Native American. 39.5% of the district's students were eligible to receive free lunch.

=== Previous school years ===
School Year	Enrollment	Gender Makeup		Racial Makeup				
School Year	Enrollment	Female	Male	Asian	African American	Hispanic	Native American	White
2005-06	6,626	48%	52%	0.60%	29.93%	0.94%	0.05%	68.49%
2004-05	6,547	47%	53%	0.49%	29.51%	0.98%	0.05%	68.98%
2003-04	6,595	48%	52%	0.47%	28.96%	0.97%	0.14%	69.46%
2002-03	6,654	48%	52%	0.47%	29.11%	0.86%	0.12%	69.45%

== Accountability statistics ==
	2006-07	2005-06	2004-05	2003-04	2002-03
District Accreditation Status	Accredited	Accredited	Accredited	Accredited	Accredited
School Performance Classifications
Level 5 (Superior Performing) Schools	4	4	5	4	1
Level 4 (Exemplary) Schools	3	4	2	4	4
Level 3 (Successful) Schools	2	1	2	1	3
Level 2 (Under Performing) Schools	0	0	0	0	0
Level 1 (Low Performing) Schools	0	0	0	0	0
Not Assigned	0	0	0	0	0

== See also ==
- List of school districts in Mississippi
