= Mississippi Highway 368 =

Highway in Mississippi

Mississippi Highway 368
- MS 368 highlighted in pink

Route information
- Maintained by MDOT and Blue Mountain
- Length: 3.561 mi (5.731 km)
- Existed: c. 1956–present

Major junctions
- West end: MS 2 / MS 15 in Blue Mountain
- East end: CO 700 near Blue Mountain

Location
- Country: United States
- State: Mississippi
- Counties: Tippah

Highway system
- Mississippi State Highway System; Interstate; US; State
← MS 367	→ MS 369

Mississippi Highway 368 (MS 368) is a state highway in northern Mississippi. The route starts at MS 2 and MS 15 in Blue Mountain and travels eastward from the town. The road intersects a few city streets inside the town and county roads outside it. MS 368 ends at its intersection with County Road 700 (CO 700). The route was designated around 1956, connecting MS 2 and MS 15 in Blue Mountain to MS 370 near Dumas. A western extension to MS 5 existed for ten years from 1957 to 1967, and the section east of CO 700 gradually returned to Tippah County for maintenance.

== Route description ==
All of MS 368 is located in southwestern Tippah County. In 2017, the Mississippi Department of Transportation (MDOT) calculated 570 vehicles traveling on MS 368 near CO 711 on average each day. The route is legally defined in Mississippi Code § 65-3-3, and it is maintained by MDOT and the town of Blue Mountain inside the city limits, as part of the Mississippi State Highway System.

MS 368 starts at the intersection of MS 2 (West Palmer Street) and MS 15 (Guyton Boulevard) in Blue Mountain. The route, known as East Palmer Street inside the town, travels eastward through a residential area. At Academy Street, the road comes to an all-way stop. The street continues uphill to Brown Street, where the route leaves the city limits and state maintenance begins. MS 368 dips southward briefly near CO 711, and it travels over Bald Knob near CO 708. Past the intersection, the route winds southeastward until it reaches CO 710, and the scenery changes from a forested area to farmland near CO 709. MS 368 continues eastward until it ends at a three-way junction at CO 700.

== History ==
Around 1956, MS 368 was designated onto a gravel road from MS 2 and MS 15 in Blue Mountain to MS 370. The route was extended northwestward to MS 5 a year later. By 1963, a section of the route near MS 370 became county maintained. MS 368 west of Blue Mountain was removed from the state highway system around four years later. A part of MS 368 east of Blue Mountain was paved by 1971, and the route was truncated from MS 370 to a point west of Dumas by 1998. The section from CO 700 to CO 701 was turned over to the Board of Supervisors of Tippah County in July 2002.

== Major intersections ==
The entire route is in Tippah County.

Location	mi	km	Destinations	Notes
Blue Mountain	0.000	0.000	MS 2 west (W Palmer Street) – Hickory Flat; MS 15 (S Guyton Boulevard) – New Albany, Ripley	Western terminus; eastern terminus of western segment of MS 2
	3.561	5.731	CO 700	Eastern terminus; end of state maintenance
1.000 mi = 1.609 km; 1.000 km = 0.621 mi
