= Mississippi Highway 2 =

Highway in Mississippi

Mississippi Highway 2
- Western segment of MS 2 highlighted in red Eastern segment of MS 2 highlighted in blue

Route information
- Maintained by MDOT
- Length: 40.637 mi (65.399 km) (45.8 mi (73.7 km) including concurrencies)
- Existed: c. 1932–present

Western segment
- Length: 10.20 mi (16.42 km)
- West end: MS 5 in Hickory Flat
- East end: MS 15 / MS 368 in Blue Mountain

Eastern segment
- Length: 35.6 mi (57.3 km)
- West end: MS 4 near Ripley
- Major intersections: US 45 / US 72 in Corinth
- East end: SR 22 near Corinth

Location
- Country: United States
- State: Mississippi
- Counties: Benton, Tippah, Alcorn

Highway system
- Mississippi State Highway System; Interstate; US; State
← MS 1	→ MS 3

Mississippi Highway 2 (MS 2) is a designation for two highways in northern Mississippi. The westernmost segment starts at MS 5 in Hickory Flat, and ends at MS 15 and MS 368 in Blue Mountain. The eastern segment starts at MS 4 near Ripley and it travels northeastwards towards Corinth. The route becomes concurrent with U.S. Route 72 (US 72) and US 45 in Corinth, and ends at the Tennessee state line. The road continues as Tennessee State Route 22 (SR 22). The route was designated around 1932, from the state line near Mount Pleasant to the state line near Corinth. The section west of Corinth became a part of US 72 by 1935, and the route was extended southwestwards to Hickory Flat by 1958.

== Route description ==
The two sections of MS 2 are located in Benton, Tippah, and Alcorn counties. MS 2 is legally defined in Mississippi Code § 65-3-3.

=== Western segment ===
The segment is located over southern Benton County and western Tippah County. In 2012, Mississippi Department of Transportation (MDOT) calculated as many as 2,400 vehicles traveling west of MS 15 and MS 368, and as few as 1,100 vehicles traveling west of the eastern boundary of the Holly Springs National Forest. The route starts at MS 5, inside the national forest. MS 2 travels eastward, leaving Hickory Flat on Bankhead Highway. Near one mile (1.6 km) later, MS 2 turns north from Bankhead Highway. The road slowly climbs uphill, as it goes through the large forest. The two-lane road also intersects a few driveways to residences. Later, the road intersects Chili Creek Road, which leads deeper into the forest and back to MS 5. East of Flat Rock Road, MS 2 leaves the national forest boundary. The road also enters into Tippah County. The route continues the bend north and south, until it reaches County Road 821 (CO 821), where it straightens out. MS 2 continues to travel east and enters the town of Blue Mountain. Near the eastern terminus, the road dips slightly to the south and becomes West Palmer Street. MS 2 ends at MS 15 and MS 368. The road continues east as MS 368.

=== Eastern segment ===
In 2012, MDOT calculated as many as 5,900 vehicles traveling east of North Shiloh Road, and as few as 1,400 vehicles traveling from CO 253 to Union Church Road. The eastern segment starts at MS 4, just outside Ripley. The route travels northeast through large sections of forests, and intersects MS 773. MS 2 then dips slightly southward at CO 523 and soon crosses the Little Hatchie River. The road turns northeastward again at CO 540, passing by small hills and houses. MS 2 later travels along the Tippah–Alcorn County line briefly, before entering Alcorn County. The road then crosses over the Hatchie River east of CO 561. At Union Church Road, MS 2 turns northward for about one mi (1.6 km), before turning east again at CO 620. MS 2 soon enters the town of Kossuth as Main Street. It goes through the town, and begins traveling northeast at CO 510. The road goes in a straight line, going through farmland and small driveways. Southwest of Corinth, the route intersects CO 613, a short road to Roscoe Turner Airport. MS 2 crosses the Tuscumbia River and turns slightly eastward. The road enters the outskirts of Corinth, and becomes concurrent at US 72. The two routes continue eastward, intersecting Norman Road and travelling towards downtown Corinth. The road intersects US 45 at a diamond interchange, and MS 2 begins travelling northward along with US 45, while US 72 continues eastward. US 45 and MS 2 bypass Corinth, with an interchange at Wenasoga Road northeast of the town center. A weigh station is located past the interchange. MS 2 then turns east at the interchange after the station, ending the concurrency with US 45. The route begins traveling east, and soon intersects MS 145, US 45's old alignment. MS 2 continues through a mostly rural area, with a combination of farmland and forests. After intersecting North Shiloh Road, the road leaves Corinth and continues traveling east. About one-half mile (800 m) later, MS 2 turns north at the western terminus of MS 350. MS 2 ends at State Line Road on the state border. The road continues north as TN 22 into Tennessee.

== History ==
MS 2 was designated around 1932, from the state line northwest of Mount Pleasant to the state line northeast of Corinth. The majority of the route was layered in gravel, with only the section from Corinth to the state line paved in asphalt. By 1935, MS 2 west of Corinth became part of US 72, and only the part from Corinth to the state line remained part of MS 2. A few years later, in 1955, a partially paved, new road was built from MS 4 to US 72. One year later, a road connecting from Hickory Flat to Blue Mountain was designated as part of MS 2, with the majority of the road paved in gravel. In 1958, the road from MS 4 and US 72 became part of MS 2. Only the section in Alcorn County was paved, the one in Tippah County was paved in gravel. The easternmost section of MS 2 was rerouted in 1964, with the road connecting to US 45 north of Corinth. All of the route was paved in Benton County by 1965. In 1971, the westernmost section of MS 2 became fully paved. All sections of the route were paved by 1977. No significant changes have been made to the route since.

== Major intersections ==
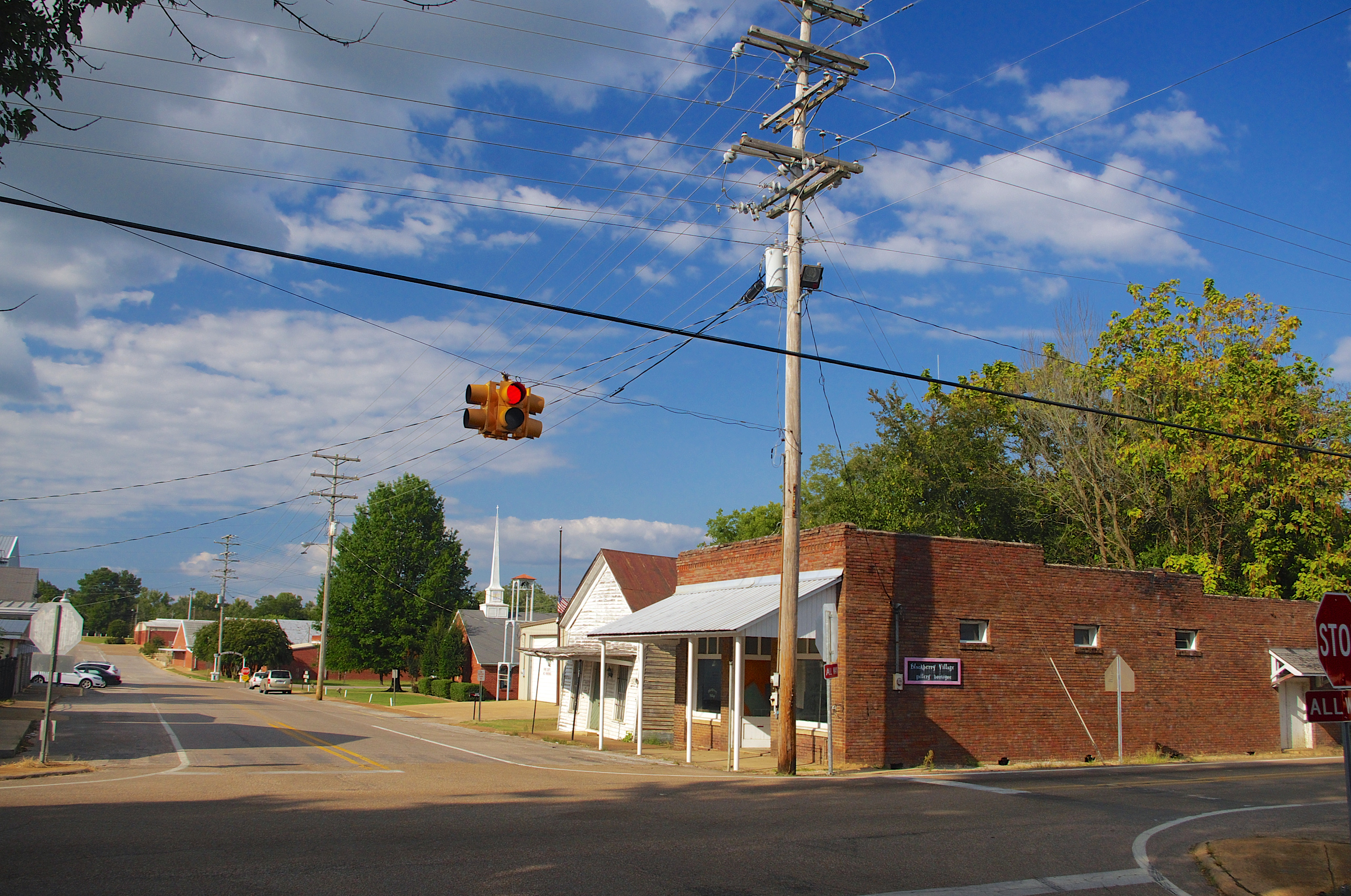
Intersection of MS 2 and CO 604 in Kossuth

County	Location	mi	km	Destinations	Notes
Benton		0.0	0.0	MS 5 to US 78 – Hickory Flat, Ashland	Western terminus
Tippah	Blue Mountain	10.2	16.4	MS 15 to MS 368 – Ripley, New Albany	Eastern terminus of the western segment; Western terminus of MS 368
Gap in route
Tippah		10.2	16.4	MS 4 – Booneville, Ripley	Western segment of the eastern segment
Tippah		11.0	17.7	MS 773 north	Southern terminus of MS 773
Alcorn	Corinth	36.3	58.4	US 72 west – Walnut, Memphis, Roscoe Turner Airport	Western end of US 72 concurrency
Alcorn	Corinth	37.5– 37.9	60.4– 61.0	US 72 east / US 45 south – Iuka, Tupelo	Diamond interchange; eastern end of US 72 concurrency; western end of US 45 concurrency
Alcorn	Corinth	39.1– 39.6	62.9– 63.7	Wenasoga Road	Diamond interchange
Alcorn	Corinth	41.2– 41.6	66.3– 66.9	US 45 north / Henson Road – Selmer, TN, Jackson, TN	Diamond interchange; eastern end of US 45 concurrency
Alcorn	Corinth	41.9	67.4	MS 145 – Jackson, TN, Corinth	
Alcorn		44.8	72.1	MS 350 east	Western terminus of MS 350
Alcorn		45.8	73.7	SR 22 north – Shiloh Battlefield, Pickwick Dam	Eastern terminus; Tennessee state line
1.000 mi = 1.609 km; 1.000 km = 0.621 mi
