= 2008 United States presidential election in Mississippi =

- November 4, 2008

Nominee	John McCain	Barack Obama
Party	Republican	Democratic
Home state	Arizona	Illinois
Running mate	Sarah Palin	Joe Biden
Electoral vote	6	0
Popular vote	724,597	554,662
Percentage	56.18%	43.00%

McCain
50–60%
60–70%
70–80%
80–90%
90–100%
Obama
40–50%
50–60%
60–70%
70–80%
80–90%
90–100%
President before election
George W. Bush
Republican
Elected President
Barack Obama
Democratic

The 2008 United States presidential election in Mississippi took place on November 4, 2008, and was part of the 2008 United States presidential election. Voters chose 6 representatives, or electors to the Electoral College, who voted for president and vice president.

Mississippi was won by Republican nominee John McCain with a 13.17% margin of victory. Prior to the election, all 17 news organizations considered this a state McCain would win, or otherwise a red state. Although the state has the largest African American percentage in the country, Mississippi remains a safe red state at the presidential level, having voted Republican every election year since 1980. While there was comparably high African American turnout compared to previous elections in Mississippi and Obama performed significantly better than Kerry in 2004, it was not enough to overcome the state's strong Republican leanings.

To date, this is the last time Warren County backed the national losing candidate.

== Primaries ==
- Mississippi Democratic primary, 2008
- Mississippi Republican primary, 2008

== Campaign ==
=== Predictions ===
There were 16 news organizations who made state-by-state predictions of the election. Here are their last predictions before election day:

Source	Ranking
D.C. Political Report	Likely R
Cook Political Report	Solid R
The Takeaway	Solid R
Electoral-vote.com	Solid R
Washington Post	Solid R
Politico	Solid R
RealClearPolitics	Solid R
FiveThirtyEight	Solid R
CQ Politics	Solid R
The New York Times	Solid R
CNN	Safe R
NPR	Solid R
MSNBC	Solid R
Fox News	Likely R
Associated Press	Likely R
Rasmussen Reports	Safe R

=== Polling ===
McCain won every single pre-election poll, each with at least 50% of the vote with the exception of the one of them. The final 3 polls average gave the Republican a lead of 51% to 39%.

=== Fundraising ===
John McCain raised a total of $1,386,749 in the state. Barack Obama raised $768,981.

=== Advertising and visits ===
Obama spent $238,401. McCain and his interest groups spent $139,999. The McCain ticket visited three times. Obama's ticket visited the state once.

== Analysis ==
Mississippi is one of the most racially polarized states in presidential elections. African Americans uniformly vote Democratic, while Whites vote Republican nearly as uniformly. In 2004, 14% of Caucasians voted for John Kerry, and 10% of African Americans voted for Bush, according to exit polling. White Democrats began splitting their tickets in national elections as early as the 1940s when the national party became more friendly to the Civil Rights Movement, culminating when Barry Goldwater carried the state with a staggering 87 percent of the vote in 1964. The Republican trend accelerated in the late 1970s with the rise of the religious right, which appealed to its status as a Bible Belt state. The last Democratic presidential nominee to win Mississippi was Jimmy Carter in 1976, even then, he only won it by 1.9 points. Due to its status as a safe red state, little campaigning took place in Mississippi by either of the two major party candidates. Indeed, the state was last seriously contested in 1980.

In 2008, Barack Obama was able to improve on Kerry's performance by six percent, mainly due to the higher African American turnout. Obama's main support was in the western delta counties next to the Mississippi River. In contrast, McCain's margins came from the regions bordering the Gulf Coast, the northeast Appalachian area, and the Jackson and Memphis suburbs. Voting became even more polarized: nine in ten Whites voted Republican, and nearly all African-Americans voted Democratic in Mississippi, according to exit polls. As expected, McCain carried Mississippi by a comfortable 13.17-point margin over Obama. McCain's margin of victory, however, was less than that of George W. Bush's 19.69-point margin of victory over John Kerry in 2004. Oktibbeha County voted Democratic for the first time since 1956.

Mississippi was also the only state to list the official candidates of the Reform Party on its ballot.

At the same time, incumbent Republican U.S. Senator Thad Cochran was reelected with 61.44% of the vote over Democrat Erik Fleming who received 38.56%. Appointed U.S. Senator Roger Wicker stood for election as well in 2008 against former Democratic Governor Ronnie Musgrove. The race was expected to be much closer, but the Republicans ran ads accusing Musgrove of supporting gay rights, not a popular position in this strongly socially conservative state. Wicker defeated Musgrove by almost 10 points, 54.96%-45.04%.

== Results ==
2008 United States presidential election in Mississippi
Party	Candidate	Votes	%	±%
Republican	John McCain Sarah Palin	724,597	56.18%	−3.27%
Democratic	Barack Obama Joe Biden	554,662	43.00%	+3.24%
Independent	Ralph Nader Matt Gonzalez	4,011	0.31%	N/A
Constitution	Chuck Baldwin Darrell Castle	2,551	0.20%	+0.05%
Libertarian	Bob Barr Wayne Allyn Root	2,529	0.20%	+0.04%
Green	Cynthia McKinney Rosa Clemente	1,034	0.08%	−0.01%
Reform	Ted Weill Frank McEnulty	481	0.04%	−0.24%
Total votes		1,289,865	100.00%	N/A

=== By county ===
County	John McCain Republican		Barack Obama Democratic		Various candidates Other parties		Margin		Total
County	#	%	#	%	#	%	#	%	Total
Adams	6,566	41.83%	9,021	57.47%	109	0.69%	-2,455	-15.64%	15,696
Alcorn	10,805	71.17%	4,130	27.20%	247	1.63%	6,675	43.97%	15,182
Amite	4,245	55.49%	3,348	43.76%	57	0.75%	897	11.73%	7,650
Attala	5,273	57.42%	3,849	41.91%	61	0.66%	1,424	15.51%	9,183
Benton	2,329	50.22%	2,227	48.02%	82	1.77%	102	2.20%	4,638
Bolivar	4,891	31.80%	10,334	67.19%	156	1.01%	-5,443	-35.39%	15,381
Calhoun	4,467	63.51%	2,522	35.85%	45	0.64%	1,945	27.65%	7,034
Carroll	3,902	65.41%	2,037	34.15%	26	0.44%	1,865	31.27%	5,965
Chickasaw	4,395	48.52%	4,588	50.65%	75	0.83%	-193	-2.13%	9,058
Choctaw	2,624	63.57%	1,459	35.34%	45	1.09%	1,165	28.22%	4,128
Claiborne	748	13.72%	4,682	85.86%	23	0.42%	-3,934	-72.14%	5,453
Clarke	5,229	62.27%	3,121	37.17%	47	0.56%	2,108	25.10%	8,397
Clay	4,466	40.26%	6,558	59.12%	68	0.61%	-2,092	-18.86%	11,092
Coahoma	2,917	27.60%	7,597	71.89%	54	0.51%	-4,680	-44.28%	10,568
Copiah	6,701	46.21%	7,710	53.17%	91	0.63%	-1,009	-6.96%	14,502
Covington	5,523	58.38%	3,852	40.71%	86	0.91%	1,671	17.66%	9,461
DeSoto	44,222	68.75%	19,627	30.51%	474	0.74%	24,595	38.24%	64,323
Forrest	15,296	56.27%	11,622	42.75%	266	0.98%	3,674	13.52%	27,184
Franklin	2,909	62.09%	1,733	36.99%	43	0.92%	1,176	25.10%	4,685
George	7,700	82.49%	1,532	16.41%	103	1.10%	6,168	66.07%	9,335
Greene	4,361	75.33%	1,366	23.60%	62	1.07%	2,995	51.74%	5,789
Grenada	6,234	55.07%	5,029	44.42%	58	0.51%	1,205	10.64%	11,321
Hancock	13,020	76.34%	3,768	22.09%	268	1.57%	9,252	54.24%	17,056
Harrison	38,757	62.55%	22,673	36.59%	527	0.85%	16,084	25.96%	61,957
Hinds	32,949	30.26%	75,401	69.24%	552	0.51%	-42,452	-38.98%	108,902
Holmes	1,714	17.96%	7,765	81.37%	64	0.67%	-6,051	-63.41%	9,543
Humphreys	1,462	28.52%	3,634	70.89%	30	0.59%	-2,172	-42.37%	5,126
Issaquena	364	38.32%	579	60.95%	7	0.74%	-215	-22.63%	950
Itawamba	7,663	77.01%	2,084	20.94%	204	2.05%	5,579	56.06%	9,951
Jackson	35,993	66.29%	17,781	32.75%	522	0.96%	18,212	33.54%	54,296
Jasper	4,135	44.90%	5,025	54.56%	50	0.54%	-890	-9.66%	9,210
Jefferson	551	12.30%	3,883	86.71%	44	0.98%	-3,332	-74.41%	4,478
Jefferson Davis	2,871	38.96%	4,454	60.43%	45	0.61%	-1,583	-21.48%	7,370
Jones	20,157	68.86%	8,846	30.22%	270	0.92%	11,311	38.64%	29,273
Kemper	1,935	37.05%	3,256	62.34%	32	0.61%	-1,321	-25.29%	5,223
Lafayette	10,278	55.68%	7,997	43.32%	185	1.00%	2,281	12.36%	18,460
Lamar	18,497	77.36%	5,159	21.58%	254	1.06%	13,338	55.78%	23,910
Lauderdale	19,582	59.14%	13,332	40.26%	200	0.60%	6,250	18.87%	33,114
Lawrence	4,369	62.33%	2,587	36.91%	53	0.76%	1,782	25.42%	7,009
Leake	5,148	55.01%	4,151	44.35%	60	0.64%	997	10.65%	9,359
Lee	22,694	64.91%	12,021	34.39%	245	0.70%	10,673	30.53%	34,960
Leflore	4,105	31.38%	8,914	68.14%	62	0.47%	-4,809	-36.76%	13,081
Lincoln	10,781	65.73%	5,505	33.56%	116	0.71%	5,276	32.17%	16,402
Lowndes	13,994	50.95%	13,209	48.09%	262	0.95%	785	2.86%	27,465
Madison	27,203	57.55%	19,831	41.95%	235	0.50%	7,372	15.60%	47,269
Marion	8,513	65.43%	4,422	33.99%	75	0.58%	4,091	31.45%	13,010
Marshall	6,683	40.56%	9,685	58.78%	110	0.67%	-3,002	-18.22%	16,478
Monroe	10,184	58.21%	7,169	40.98%	143	0.82%	3,015	17.23%	17,496
Montgomery	3,071	53.76%	2,609	45.68%	32	0.56%	462	8.09%	5,712
Neshoba	8,209	72.00%	3,114	27.31%	79	0.69%	5,095	44.69%	11,402
Newton	6,579	66.76%	3,218	32.65%	58	0.59%	3,361	34.10%	9,855
Noxubee	1,525	23.14%	5,030	76.34%	34	0.52%	-3,505	-53.19%	6,589
Oktibbeha	9,320	49.60%	9,326	49.63%	146	0.78%	-6	-0.03%	18,792
Panola	7,620	46.42%	8,690	52.94%	106	0.65%	-1,070	-6.52%	16,416
Pearl River	17,881	79.67%	4,320	19.25%	242	1.08%	13,561	60.42%	22,443
Perry	4,067	71.80%	1,533	27.07%	64	1.13%	2,534	44.74%	5,664
Pike	8,651	47.91%	9,276	51.38%	128	0.71%	-625	-3.46%	18,055
Pontotoc	9,727	75.59%	2,982	23.17%	159	1.24%	6,745	52.42%	12,868
Prentiss	7,703	70.39%	3,020	27.60%	221	2.02%	4,683	42.79%	10,944
Quitman	1,334	32.01%	2,803	67.25%	31	0.74%	-1,469	-35.24%	4,168
Rankin	48,140	76.29%	14,372	22.78%	591	0.94%	33,768	53.51%	63,103
Scott	6,584	56.41%	5,025	43.06%	62	0.53%	1,559	13.36%	11,671
Sharkey	873	31.23%	1,907	68.23%	15	0.54%	-1,034	-36.99%	2,795
Simpson	7,641	60.59%	4,817	38.20%	152	1.21%	2,824	22.39%	12,610
Smith	6,265	75.44%	1,968	23.70%	72	0.87%	4,297	51.74%	8,305
Stone	5,149	71.06%	1,996	27.55%	101	1.39%	3,153	43.51%	7,246
Sunflower	3,245	28.99%	7,838	70.03%	110	0.98%	-4,593	-41.03%	11,193
Tallahatchie	2,786	40.13%	4,105	59.12%	52	0.75%	-1,319	-19.00%	6,943
Tate	7,678	60.09%	5,003	39.15%	97	0.76%	2,675	20.93%	12,778
Tippah	6,937	71.33%	2,623	26.97%	165	1.70%	4,314	44.36%	9,725
Tishomingo	6,249	74.22%	1,962	23.30%	208	2.47%	4,287	50.92%	8,419
Tunica	1,017	23.48%	3,279	75.69%	36	0.83%	-2,262	-52.22%	4,332
Union	9,072	74.39%	2,985	24.48%	138	1.13%	6,087	49.91%	12,195
Walthall	4,253	54.67%	3,456	44.42%	71	0.91%	797	10.24%	7,780
Warren	11,152	51.24%	10,489	48.19%	123	0.57%	663	3.05%	21,764
Washington	6,347	32.41%	13,148	67.14%	88	0.45%	-6,801	-34.73%	19,583
Wayne	6,070	60.57%	3,890	38.81%	62	0.62%	2,180	21.75%	10,022
Webster	4,072	74.62%	1,349	24.72%	36	0.66%	2,723	49.90%	5,457
Wilkinson	1,560	30.36%	3,534	68.77%	45	0.88%	-1,974	-38.41%	5,139
Winston	5,497	53.78%	4,653	45.52%	71	0.69%	844	8.26%	10,221
Yalobusha	3,628	53.15%	3,151	46.16%	47	0.69%	477	6.99%	6,826
Yazoo	5,290	46.09%	6,116	53.29%	71	0.62%	-826	-7.20%	11,477
Totals	724,597	56.18%	554,662	43.00%	10,606	0.82%	169,935	13.17%	1,289,865

Counties that flipped from Democratic to Republican

- Benton (largest municipality: Ashland)

Counties that flipped from Republican to Democratic

- Chickasaw (largest municipality: Okolona)
- Copiah (largest municipality: Hazlehurst)
- Oktibbeha (largest municipality: Starkville)
- Panola (largest municipality: Sardis)
- Pike (largest municipality: Magnolia)
- Yazoo (largest municipality: Yazoo City)

=== By congressional district ===
John McCain carried three of the state's four congressional districts, including two districts held by Democrats.

District	McCain	Obama	Representative
1st	61.28%	37.74%	Travis Childers
2nd	33.57%	65.86%	Bennie Thompson
3rd	61.08%	38.17%	Chip Pickering (110th Congress)
3rd	61.08%	38.17%	Gregg Harper (111th Congress)
4th	67.27%	31.76%	Gene Taylor

== Electors ==
Technically the voters of Mississippi cast their ballots for electors: representatives to the Electoral College. Mississippi is allocated 6 electors because it has 4 congressional districts and 2 senators. All candidates who appear on the ballot or qualify to receive write-in votes must submit a list of 6 electors, who pledge to vote for their candidate and their running mate. Whoever wins the majority of votes in the state is awarded all 6 electoral votes. Their chosen electors then vote for president and vice president. Although electors are pledged to their candidate and running mate, they are not obligated to vote for them. An elector who votes for someone other than their candidate is known as a faithless elector.

The electors of each state and the District of Columbia met on December 15, 2008, to cast their votes for president and vice president. The Electoral College itself never meets as one body. Instead the electors from each state and the District of Columbia met in their respective capitols.

The following were the members of the Electoral College from the state. All 6 were pledged to John McCain and Sarah Palin:

1. Jim Barksdale
2. Barry Bridgforth
3. Fred Carl
4. Bobby Chain
5. Charles Doty
6. Victor Mavar
