= Mississippi Highway 5 =

State highway in Benton County, Mississippi, United States

Mississippi Highway 5
- MS 5 highlighted in red

Route information
- Maintained by MDOT
- Length: 24.3 mi (39.1 km)
- Existed: 1932–present

Major junctions
- South end: MS 178 in Hickory Flat
- MS 2 near Hickory Flat; MS 4 in Ashland
- North end: US 72 near Michigan City

Location
- Country: United States
- State: Mississippi
- Counties: Benton

Highway system
- Mississippi State Highway System; Interstate; US; State
← MS 4	→ MS 6

Mississippi Highway 5 (MS 5) is a state highway in Benton County, Mississippi, United States. It runs 24.3 mi (39.107 km) from MS 178 in Hickory Flat north to U.S. Route 72 (US 72) to the south of Michigan City. The route runs through the Holly Springs National Forest for much of its length and passes through Ashland. To the south of Ashland, MS 5 has a concurrency with MS 4. The MS 5 designation was first used by 1932 for an unpaved road between Hickory Flat and the Tennessee border in Michigan City. In 1943, the northern terminus was cut back to US 72. MS 5 was completely paved by 1951 and has retained its current alignment since then.

== Route description ==
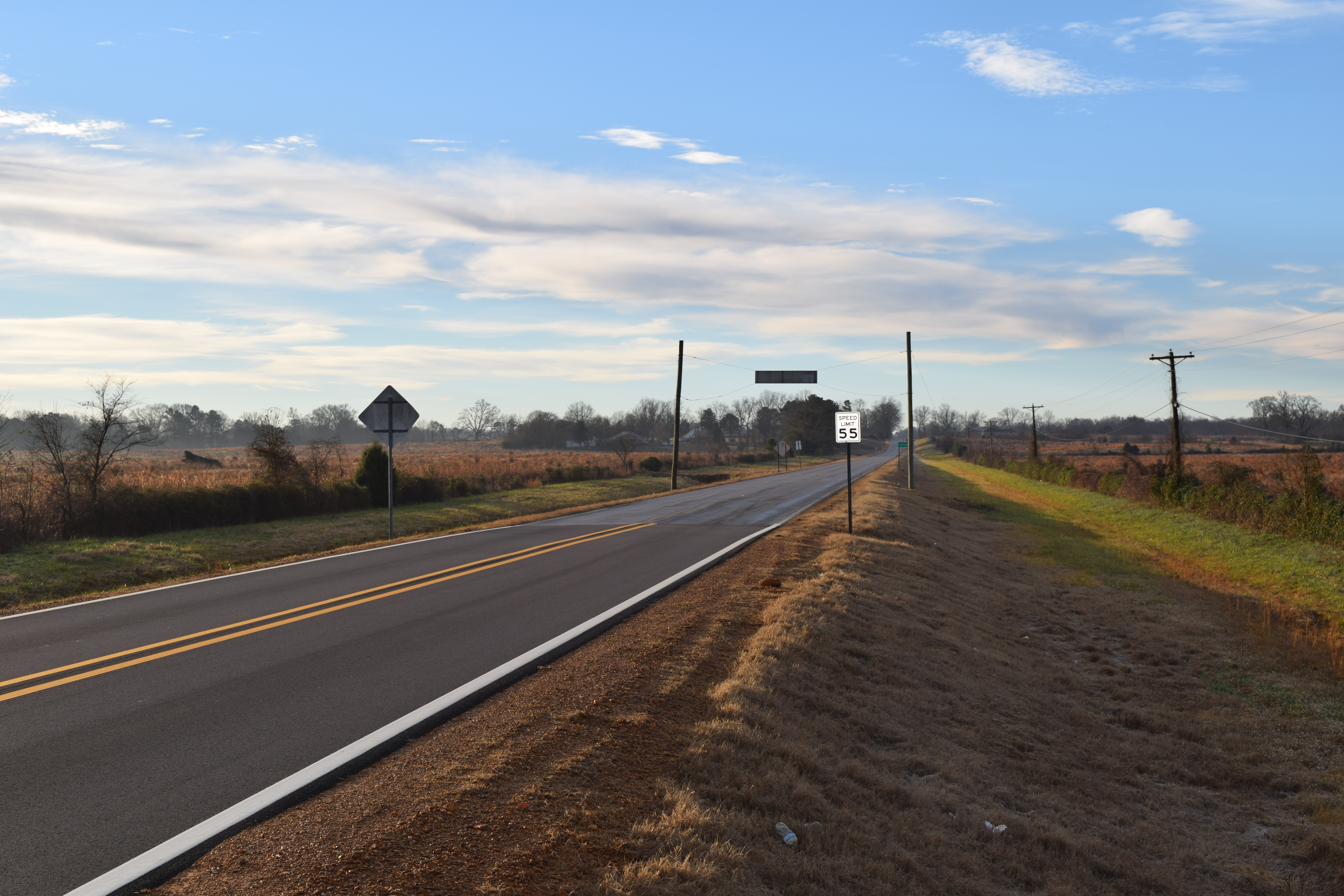
Looking south on Mississippi Highway 5 near its northern terminus

MS 5 begins at an intersection with MS 178 in the community of Hickory Flat, which is within the Holly Springs National Forest. The route heads north from this point on a two-lane undivided road through dense forests with some fields and homes. After a junction with the western terminus of MS 2, the highway continues through rural land and passes a few lakes. After crossing the Tippah River, MS 5 reaches the MS 4 intersection and forms a concurrency with that route.

The two routes leave the boundaries of the Holly Springs National Forest, passing through a mix of farmland and woodland with some homes and coming to the community of Ashland. Here, MS 4 splits from MS 5 by turning to the west, and MS 5 becomes Boundary Drive, which runs by businesses and homes. The road intersects the western terminus of MS 370 before it leaves Ashland. The route heads into agricultural areas with some woodland and homes, making a turn to the northwest before resuming north. MS 5 comes to its northern terminus at an intersection with US 72 located to the south of Michigan City. MS 5 is legally defined in Mississippi Code § 65-3-3. The entire length of MS 5 is designated a scenic route by Chapter 316, Senate Bill 2547, Laws 1989. While not signed with the blue scenic route shields, it does have the scenic route marker above all shields along the highway, except for the junction with US 72.

== History ==
What is now MS 5 originally existed as an unnumbered unpaved road by 1928. The MS 5 designation was assigned by 1932 for the road running from US 78 in Hickory Flat to the Tennessee border in Michigan City, where it connected to SR 18. This road was a gravel road south of Ashland and an earth road north of Ashland. Two years later, the portion north of Ashland became a gravel road. In 1943, the northern terminus of MS 5 was cut back to its current location at US 72, with MS 7 connecting to SR 18 at the Tennessee border. By 1948, the portion of route south of Ashland was paved. The remainder of the route was paved three years later. Since then, the route has not undergone any alignment changes. Since March 2, 1989, the entire length of the highway has been designated a scenic route.

== Major intersections ==
The entire route is in Benton County.

Location	mi	km	Destinations	Notes
Hickory Flat	0.0	0.0	MS 178 to US 78 – New Albany, Holly Springs	Southern terminus
	0.3	0.48	MS 2 east – Blue Mountain	Western terminus of western segment of MS 2
	9.2	14.8	MS 4 east – Ripley	South end of MS 4 overlap
Ashland	15.5	24.9	MS 4 west – Holly Springs	North end of MS 4 overlap
Ashland	16.0	25.7	MS 370 east (Ripley Avenue) – Ashland	Western terminus of MS 370
	24.3	39.1	US 72 – Memphis, Corinth	Northern terminus
1.000 mi = 1.609 km; 1.000 km = 0.621 mi: Concurrency terminus

== See also ==
- List of state highways in Mississippi
