= Snow Lake Shores, Mississippi =

- Town
- Location of Snow Lake Shores, Mississippi

- Location in the United States
- Coordinates: 34°49′26″N 89°14′19″W
- Country: United States
- State: Mississippi
- County: Benton
- Established: 1958
- Incorporated: 1996

Area
  - Total: 0.90 sq mi (2.32 km^{2})
  - Land: 0.68 sq mi (1.76 km^{2})
  - Water: 0.22 sq mi (0.56 km^{2})
- Elevation: 417 ft (127 m)

Population (2020)
  - Total: 306
  - Density: 449.5/sq mi (173.54/km^{2})
- Time zone: UTC-6 (Central (CST))
  - Summer (DST): UTC-5 (CDT)
- ZIP code: 38603
- Area code: 662
- FIPS code: 28-68960
- GNIS feature ID: 2407363
- Website: townofsnowlakeshores.com

Snow Lake Shores is a town in Benton County, Mississippi, United States. As of the 2020 census, Snow Lake Shores had a population of 306.

== Geography ==
Snow Lake Shores is located along Mississippi Highway 4 in west-central Benton County, approximately 4 miles (6 km) west of Ashland and 14 miles (23 km) northeast of Holly Springs.

According to the United States Census Bureau, the town has a total area of 0.89 square miles (2.3 km^{2}), of which 0.69 square miles (1.8 km^{2}) is land and 0.23 square miles (0.6 km^{2}), or 24.13%, is water. The town consists of homes built around Snow Lake, an impoundment on Big Snow Creek, a tributary of the Tippah River and ultimately the Tallahatchie River.

== History ==
The first Anglo settlers in the area were John M. Ferrell and his wife, who moved from Tennessee to a site west of present-day Snow Lake Shores in 1839. One of their ten children, Emaline, married an Englishman – Joe Shone. They built a house two miles east of the Ferrell homestead that became known as Shone's Pond. The area around Shone's Pond consisted mostly of marsh and cypress swamps. The names Shone's Mill and Shone's Mill Pond were sometimes applied to the area in its early years.

In 1947, New Yorker Walter Utley moved to neighboring Marshall County with plans to build a resort-style development in the area. Big Snow Creek with its three forks looked to be a good prospect. Around 1956, a partnership of three men – including Utley – organized to develop a residential subdivision that became known as Snow Lake Shores. In 1957, Big Snow Lake was created by building a dam on a local stream. Snow Lake Shores was established in 1958 as a private, restricted resort community. It was marketed as a safe, family-friendly place for people to both vacation and live year-round. A volunteer fire department was created in 1974.

After 38 years of existence, Snow Lake Shores was incorporated as a town in 1996. Incorporation meant that the town would be eligible to receive grants for paving roads and installing a new water system. Eddie Koen was appointed as the first mayor of Snow Lake Shores along with five aldermen who served as the new town's governing body until municipal elections were held in October 1996.

Although the permanent resident population of Snow Lake Shores stands at around 300, that figure can grow to over 900 during the summer months as seasonal residents and vacationers come to the community.

== Demographics ==
Historical population
Census	Pop.	Note	%±
2000	300		—
2010	319		6.3%
2020	306		−4.1%
U.S. Decennial Census

=== 2020 census ===
Snow Lake Shores racial composition (Note: Note: the US Census treats Hispanic/Latino as an ethnic category. This table excludes Latinos from the racial categories and assigns them to a separate category. Hispanics/Latinos can be of any race.)
Race	Number	Percentage
White (NH)	268	87.12%
Black or African American (NH)	12	3.92%
Some Other Race (NH)	4	1.31%
Mixed/Multi-Racial (NH)	15	4.9%
Hispanic or Latino	7	2.29%
Total	306	

As of the 2020 United States census, there were 306 people, 192 households, and 98 families residing in the town.

=== 2000 census ===
As of the census of 2000, there were 300 people, 147 households, and 105 families residing in the town. The population density was 438.7 inhabitants per square mile (169.4/km^{2}). There were 297 housing units at an average density of 434.3 per square mile (167.7/km^{2}). The racial makeup of the town was 97.00% White, 2.00% African American, 0.67% from other races, and 0.33% from two or more races. Hispanic or Latino of any race were 1.33% of the population.

There were 147 households, out of which 12.2% had children under the age of 18 living with them, 65.3% were married couples living together, 6.1% had a female householder with no husband present, and 27.9% were non-families. 24.5% of all households were made up of individuals, and 8.8% had someone living alone who was 65 years of age or older. The average household size was 2.04 and the average family size was 2.39.

In the town, the population was spread out, with 10.0% under the age of 18, 2.3% from 18 to 24, 19.7% from 25 to 44, 40.3% from 45 to 64, and 27.7% who were 65 years of age or older. The median age was 55 years. For every 100 females, there were 96.1 males. For every 100 females age 18 and over, there were 97.1 males.

The median income for a household in the town was $30,625, and the median income for a family was $33,750. Males had a median income of $28,250 versus $20,556 for females. The per capita income for the town was $19,603. About 6.8% of families and 6.1% of the population were below the poverty line, including 19.2% of those under the age of eighteen and none of those 65 or over.

== Education ==
Snow Lake Shores is served by the Benton County School District.
