= Bill Renick =

American politician

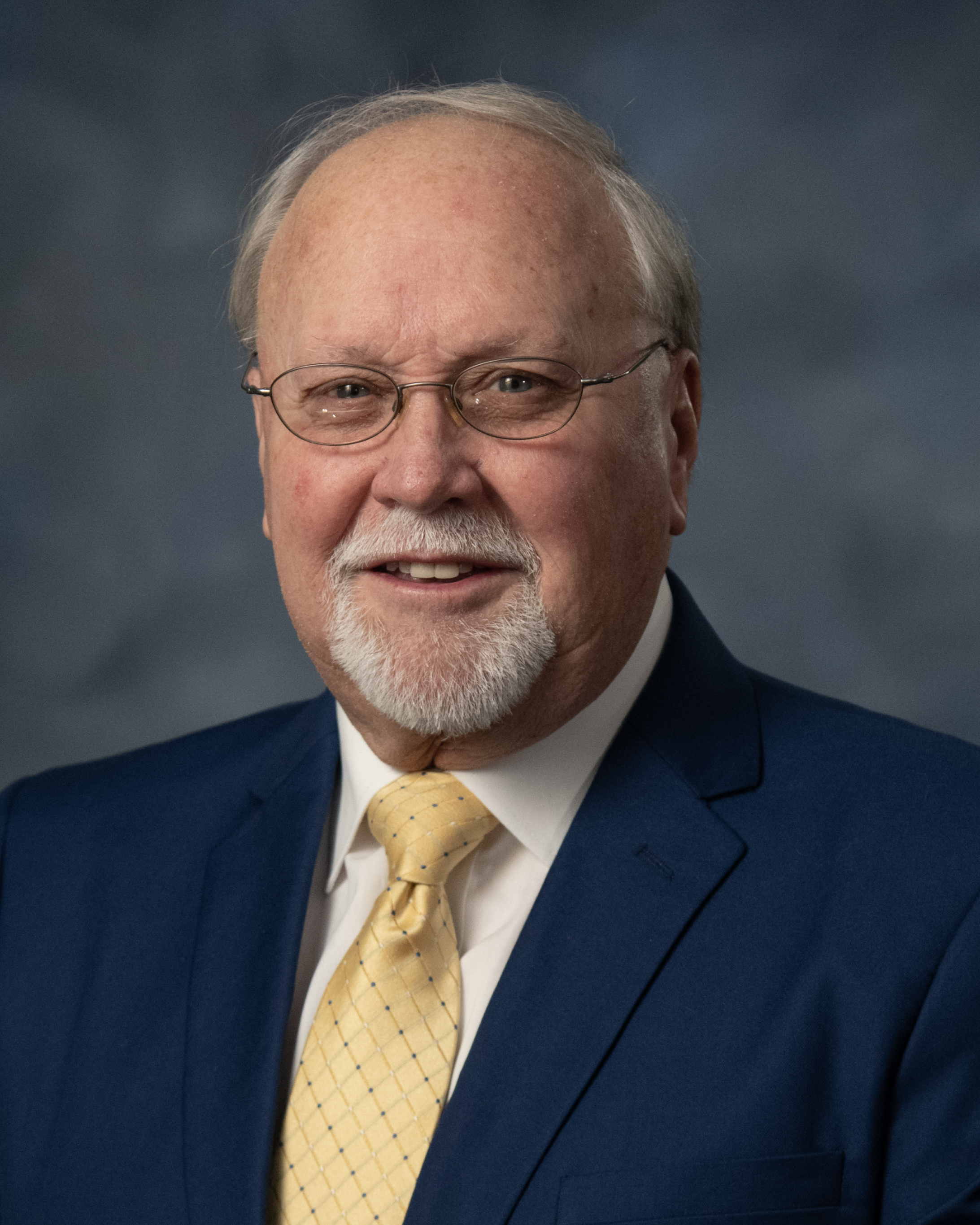
- Official portrait, 2023

Chair of the Tennessee Valley Authority
- Incumbent
- Assumed office April 1, 2025
- President: Donald Trump
- Preceded by: Joe Ritch

Member of the Tennessee Valley Authority Board of Directors
- Incumbent
- Assumed office January 4, 2023
- Appointed by: Joe Biden
- Preceded by: Jeff W. Smith

Member of the Mississippi State Senate from the 2nd district
- In office January 5, 1988 – January 7, 1992
- Preceded by: William R. Minor
- Succeeded by: Harvey Moss

Personal details
- Born: June 16, 1953 (age 73) Ashland, Mississippi, U.S.
- Party: Democratic

William J. Renick (born June 16, 1953) is an American politician.

Renick was born on June 16, 1953, in Ashland, Mississippi, to Jack and Lillie Jean Renick. He graduated from Frayser High School in Memphis, Tennessee. At the age of 18, he became one of the youngest elected officials in the history of Mississippi when he was elected an alderman for the city of Ashland. At the age of 27, Renick became one of Mississippi's youngest mayors. He was later elected a Benton County Supervisor, where he helped to start the North Benton County Health Care, Inc. which would later become North Mississippi Primary Health Care, Inc.

From 1988 to 1992, Renick served as a member of the Mississippi State Senate representing Marshall, Benton and Tippah Counties in north Mississippi. In 1989, Renick was targeted in a lawsuit by the Mississippi Attorney General's office as well as the state Ethics Commission. In the lawsuit, Renick was charged with using his position as Benton County supervisor to benefit his own trucking company; the suit was dismissed. When his Senate colleague, Eddie Briggs (R) was elected Lieutenant Governor of Mississippi, Renick became his chief of staff. In 2002, another former State Senate colleague, Governor Ronnie Musgrove (D), hired Renick as Chief of Staff to the Governor. He campaigned for Governor of Mississippi as a Democrat before withdrawing on April 23, 2007.

In June 2022, President Joe Biden nominated Renick to the nine-member Board of Directors of the Tennessee Valley Authority. Renick's appointment was confirmed by the U.S. Senate on December 21, 2022. His term on the Board started on January 4, 2023, and is scheduled to end on May 18, 2027.
