= CRX =

CRX may refer to:

- Crossair (former ICAO airline designator: CRX), a Swiss airline
- CRX (band), an American band originating from Los Angeles, California formed as the side-project of The Strokes guitarist, Nick Valensi
- CRX (gene), a human gene that plays a role in the differentiation of photoreceptor cells
- Crunchyroll Expo, an American anime convention
- Honda CR-X, a Japanese sports car
- Roscoe Turner Airport (IATA airport code: CRX), an airport in the US state of Mississippi.
