= Bill G. Lowrey =

American politician

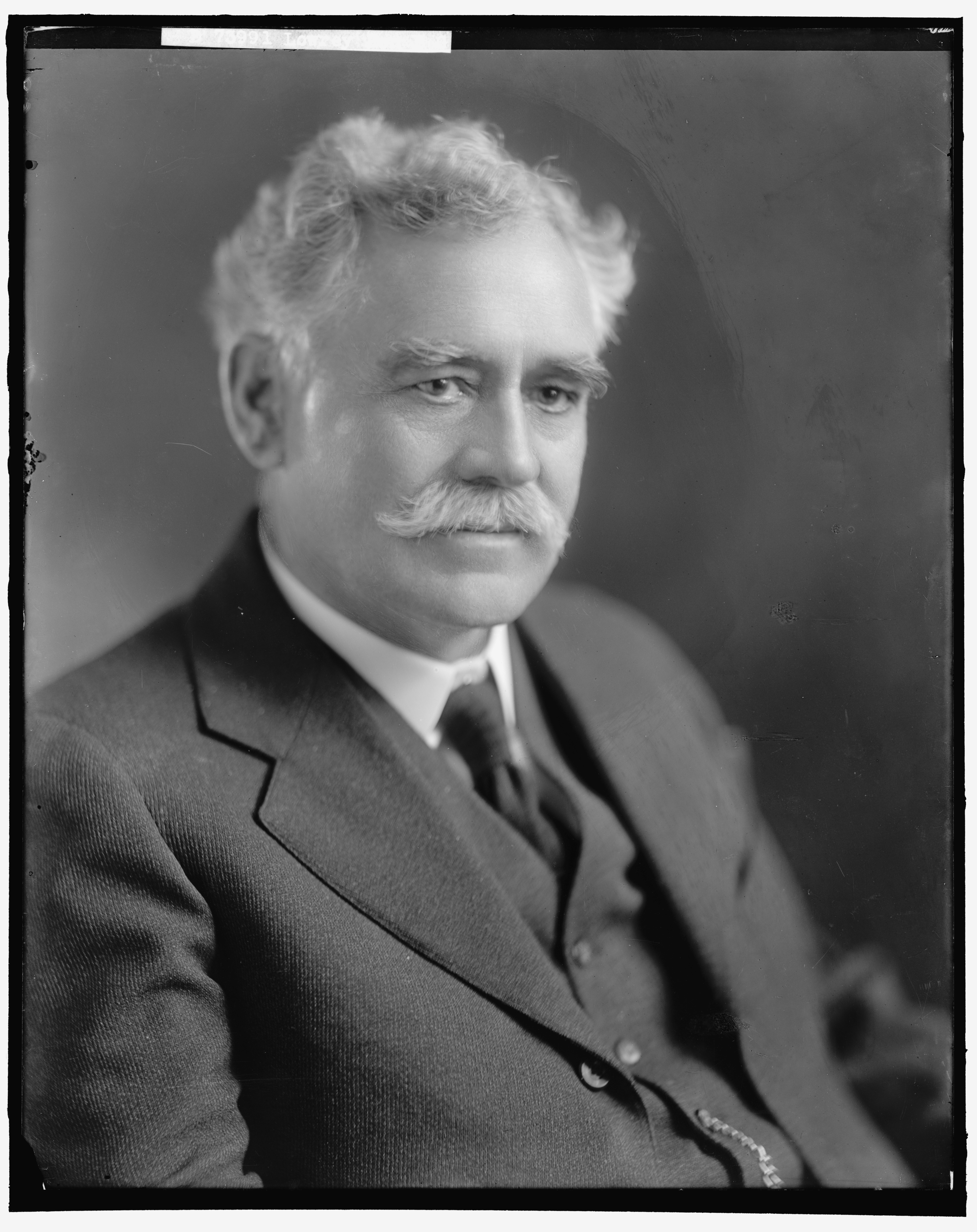
- Harris & Ewing portrait

Member of the U.S. House of Representatives from Mississippi's 2nd district
- In office March 4, 1921 – March 3, 1929
- Preceded by: Hubert D. Stephens
- Succeeded by: Wall Doxey

Personal details
- Born: Bill Green Lowrey; May 25, 1862 Kossuth, Mississippi, U.S.
- Died: September 2, 1947 (aged 85) Olive Branch, Mississippi, U.S.
- Resting place: Blocker Cemetery
- Party: Democratic
- Education: Blue Mountain Academy
- Alma mater: Mississippi College; Tulane University

Bill Green Lowrey (May 25, 1862 – September 2, 1947) was an American higher education administrator and politician who served four terms as a U.S. representative from Mississippi from 1921 to 1929.

== Early life ==
Bill Lowrey was born on May 25, 1862, in Kossuth, Mississippi. He attended public school and the Blue Mountain Academy in Blue Mountain, Mississippi, graduating from Mississippi College at Clinton in 1887. During 1888-9 he was a student at Tulane University, New Orleans, Louisiana.

== Career ==
=== Higher education ===
Lowrey became a professor at Blue Mountain College. In 1898 he was promoted to president of the college, a position he held until 1911 when he moved to Texas to become the president of the Amarillo Military Academy. Leaving that post in 1916, he accepted a posting as field secretary for Hillman College and Blue Mountain College until 1920, when he was appointed vice president of the Blue Mountain College, a position he held until 1921.

=== Congress ===
Lowrey was elected as a Democrat to the Sixty-seventh and to the three succeeding Congresses (March 4, 1921 - March 3, 1929), but was not renominated to the Seventy-first Congress (1929).

=== Later career ===
He served as clerk of the United States Court for the Northern District of Mississippi 1929–1935.

== Family ==
Lowrey was the son of Mark Perrin Lowrey.

== Death ==
Lowrey died in Olive Branch, Mississippi, September 2, 1947 and was interred in Blocker Cemetery.

U.S. House of Representatives
Preceded by Hubert D. Stephens	Member of the U.S. House of Representatives from Mississippi's 2nd congressional district 1921-1929	Succeeded by Wall Doxey
