= Benjamin D. Nabers =

American politician (1812–1878)

Member of the U.S. House of Representatives from Mississippi's 1st district
- In office March 4, 1851 – March 3, 1853
- Preceded by: Jacob Thompson
- Succeeded by: Daniel B. Wright

Personal details
- Born: Benjamin Duke Nabers; November 7, 1812 Franklin, Tennessee, US
- Died: September 6, 1878 (aged 65) Holly Springs, Mississippi, US
- Resting place: Hillcrest Cemetery
- Party: Union
- Occupation: Politician, businessman, lawyer

Benjamin Duke Nabers (or Neighbors; November 7, 1812 – September 6, 1878) was an American politician, businessman, and lawyer. A member of the Union Party, he was a member of the United States House of Representatives from Mississippi.

== Biography ==
Nabers was born on November 7, 1812, in Franklin, Tennessee, the son of Franklin Neighbours and Sarah (née McLaughlin) Neighbours. He was educated at common schools and later moved to Hickory Flat, Mississippi. There, he was a merchant and an officeholder of several local roles. He owned slaves. He later lived in Shelby.

Nabers was a member of the Union Party. He was a member of the United States House of Representatives from March 4, 1851, to March 3, 1853, representing Mississippi's 1st district. He lost the primaries for the following election. He was a Presidential elector in the 1860 election, as which he voted for John Bell and Edward Everett. Politically, he was liberal.

After serving in Congress, Nabers moved to Memphis, Tennessee. He read law, and in 1860, was admitted to the bar, after which he began practicing law in Memphis. In 1860, he moved to Holly Springs, Mississippi. He owned a manufacturing company for cotton, grain, and tobacco products. From 1870 to 1874, he was clerk of a court of equity. For two years, he was a board member lf the Mississippi State Penitentiary.

On November 3, 1838, Nabers married Rebecca A. Mason. He was a Freemason. He died on September 6, 1878, aged 65, in Holly Springs, and was buried at Hillcrest Cemetery.

U.S. House of Representatives
Preceded by Jacob Thompson	Member of the U.S. House of Representatives from Mississippi's 1st congressional district 1851–1853	Succeeded by Daniel B. Wright
