= Davis' Mills Battle Site =

- U.S. National Register of Historic Places
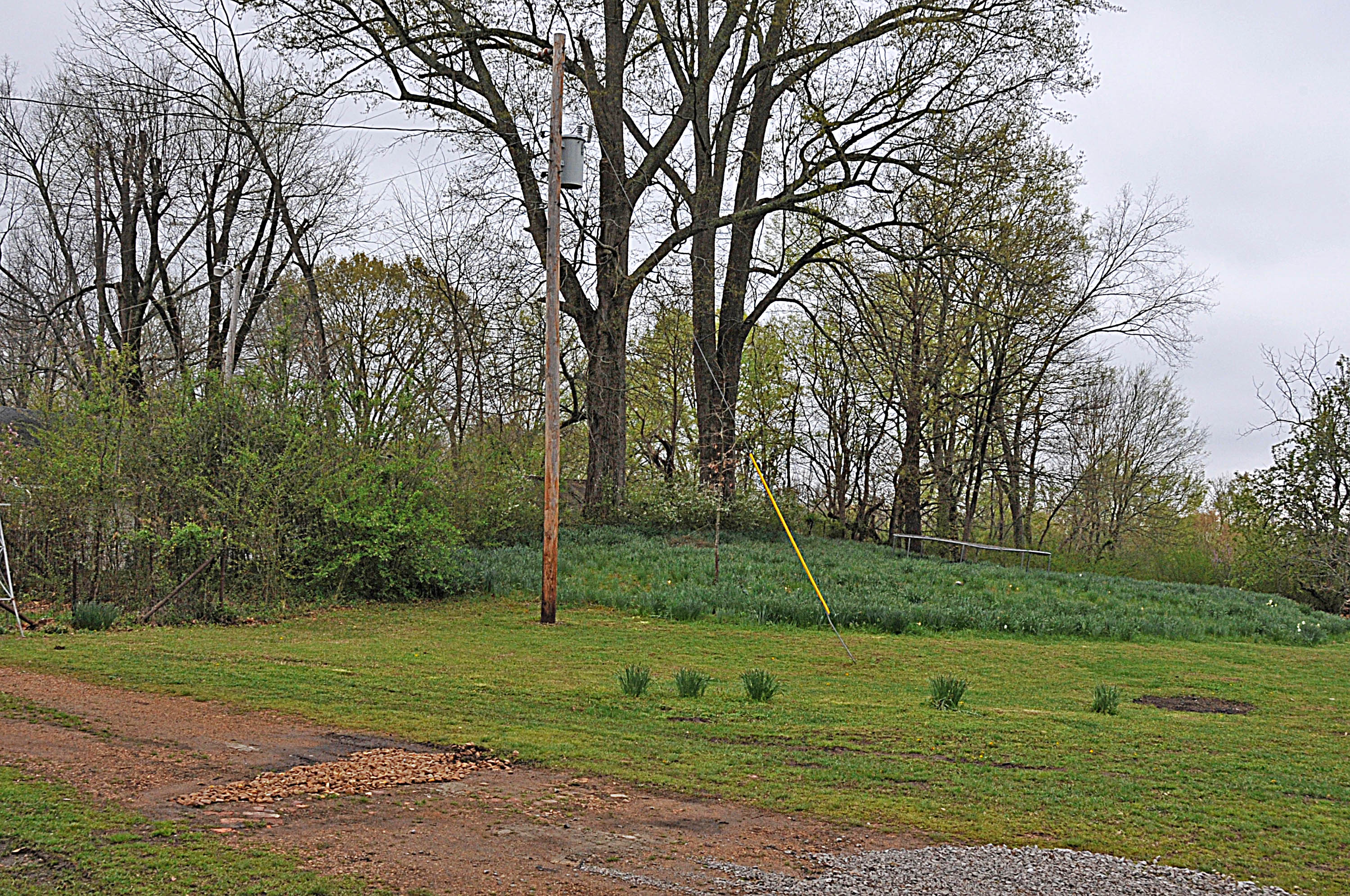
- Indian mound on the battlefield

- Location within Mississippi Location within the United States
- Location: Off MS 7, Michigan City, Mississippi
- Coordinates: 34°58′43″N 89°15′07″W
- Area: 16 acres (6.5 ha)
- Built: 1862
- NRHP reference No.: 73001002
- Added to NRHP: October 2, 1973

The Davis' Mills Battle Site is the historic site of an American Civil War conflict that took place on December 21, 1862. It was added to the National Register of Historic Places on October 2, 1973. It is located off Mississippi Hwy 7 in what is now Michigan City, Mississippi in Benton County, Mississippi.

The cavalry of the Confederate Army under Major General Earl Van Dorn attacked a Federal garrison commanded by W.H. Morgan at the Davis' Mills the site on December 21, 1862. The small settlement included houses, a flour mill, and a saw mill on the north bank of the Wolf River near a Mississippi Central Railroad wooden trestle crossing. An Indian mound was used by Federal troops as a fortification. A tree on the site was carved with names, dates, initials, and regimental information by some of the soldiers.

== See also ==
- National Register of Historic Places listings in Mississippi
