= Daniel B. Wright =

American politician (1812–1887)

Member of the U.S. House of Representatives from Mississippi's 1st district
- In office March 4, 1853 – March 3, 1857
- Preceded by: Benjamin Nabers
- Succeeded by: Lucius Q. C. Lamar

Personal details
- Born: February 17, 1812 near Mount Pleasant, Tennessee, US
- Died: December 27, 1887 (aged 75) Ashland, Mississippi, US
- Resting place: McDonald (private) Cemetery, near Ashland, Mississippi, US
- Party: Democratic
- Education: Cumberland University

Military service
- Allegiance: Confederate States of America
- Branch/service: Confederate States Army
- Years of service: 1861–65
- Rank: Colonel
- Commands: 34th Mississippi Infantry
- Battles/wars: American Civil War

Daniel Boone Wright (February 17, 1812 – December 27, 1887) was an American slaveholder, soldier, lawyer and politician who served two terms as a U.S. representative from Mississippi from 1853 to 1857. He joined the Confederate Army during the American Civil War.

== Biography ==
Born near Mount Pleasant, Tennessee, Wright attended the common schools and graduated from Cumberland University in Lebanon, Tennessee, in 1837. He was admitted to the bar in 1840 and commenced practice in Ashland, Mississippi. He moved to Salem, Mississippi, in 1850, where he continued the practice of law.

Wright became a wealthy planter, holding thirty six people as slaves in 1860.

=== Congress ===
Wright was elected as a Democrat to the Thirty-third and Thirty-fourth Congresses (March 4, 1853 – March 3, 1857). He was not a candidate for renomination in 1856, and resumed the practice of law at Ashland.

=== Civil War ===
Wright was elected as a delegate to the Mississippi state secession convention in January, 1861, voting in favor of leaving the Union. He then enlisted in the Confederate Army during the Civil War, and on April 16, 1862, was elected lieutenant colonel of the 34th Mississippi Infantry Regiment. He was wounded at the Battle of Perryville in October 1862, and was taken prisoner. He was held at the Camp Chase POW camp in Ohio until he was exchanged and released. Wright was then appointed as a colonel of Cavalry on June 6, 1864, and served as a judge of military courts in Forrest's Cavalry Corps.

=== Later career and death ===
He resumed the practice of his profession in Ashland, Mississippi, and was also interested in agricultural pursuits in Benton County.

He died in Ashland, Mississippi, on December 27, 1887. He was interred in the McDonald (private) Cemetery, near Ashland, Mississippi.

U.S. House of Representatives
Preceded by Benjamin Nabers	Member of the U.S. House of Representatives from Mississippi's 1st congressional district 1853–1857	Succeeded by Lucius Q. C. Lamar
