= Salem, Mississippi =

- Extinct town
- Location within Mississippi Location within the United States
- Coordinates: 34°51′06″N 89°12′40″W
- Country: United States
- State: Mississippi
- County: Benton
- Elevation: 541 ft (165 m)
- Time zone: UTC-6 (Central (CST))
  - Summer (DST): UTC-5 (CDT)
- Area code: 662
- GNIS feature ID: 705897

Salem is an extinct town in Benton County, Mississippi, United States.

== History ==
Salem was settled in 1836 and incorporated in May 1837. At one point, Salem was home to twelve businesses, two hotels, and a female school.

Salem was destroyed by the Union Army during the Civil War, leading many residents to resettle in nearby Ashland.

A post office operated under the name Salem from 1837 to 1909.

== Notable people ==
- Nathan Bedford Forrest, Confederate Army officer; Moved when he was 12 and spent his childhood in Salem.
- Joseph W. Matthews, 15th Governor of Mississippi from 1848 to 1850.
- Norris C. Williamson, member of the Louisiana State Senate from 1924 to 1932
- Daniel B. Wright, U.S. Representative for Mississippi's 1st congressional district from 1853 to 1857.
