= Flora MacDonald College =

Former college in North Carolina, US

- Flora Macdonald College
- U.S. National Register of Historic Places
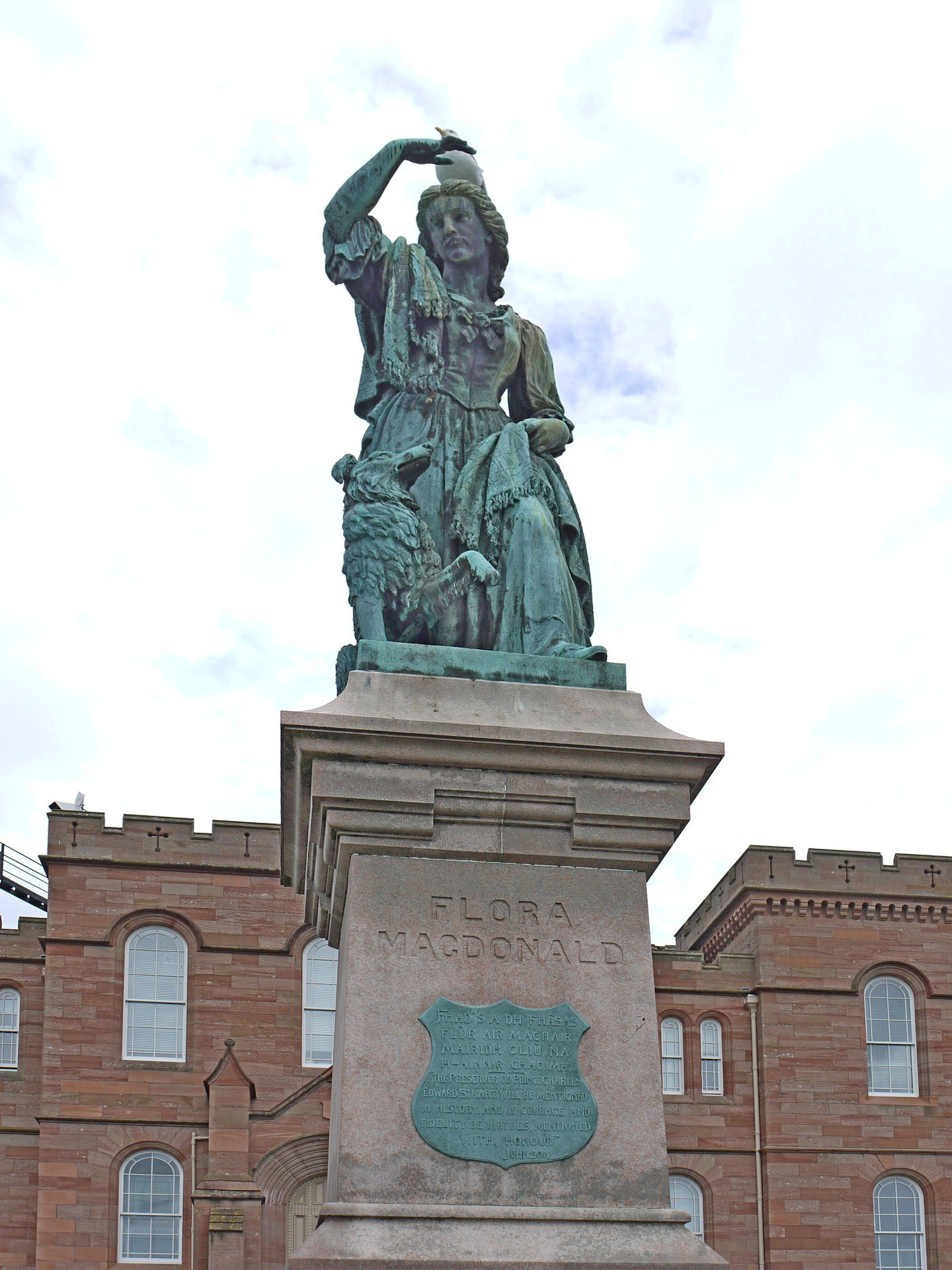

- Location within North Carolina Location within the United States
- Location: College St. and 2nd Ave., Red Springs, North Carolina
- Coordinates: 34°49′03″N 79°10′38″W
- Area: 30 acres (12 ha)
- Architectural style: Classical Revival
- NRHP reference No.: 76001336
- Added to NRHP: April 3, 1976

Flora Macdonald College was a women's college in Red Springs, Robeson County, North Carolina. It was founded in 1896 by Dr. Charles Graves Vardell as the Red Springs Seminary, renamed Southern Presbyterian College and Conservatory of Music in 1903 then Flora MacDonald College in 1914.

The Neoclassical style main building was constructed between 1900 and 1910 and consists of six sections: the brick Conservatory Hall (1900); East Hall (1902); Morgan Hall (1904); West Hall (1905); the center domed section Main Hall (1906); and Long West (1910). The main block, six bays wide and nine deep, has a Palladian entrance and a three-story Doric order tetrastyle portico and is surmounted by a dome. In the garden is a stone monument commemorating two of Macdonald's children, whose remains were moved from unmarked graves in Richmond County and reinterred on the college grounds in 1937. The building was named to the National Register of Historic Places in 1976.

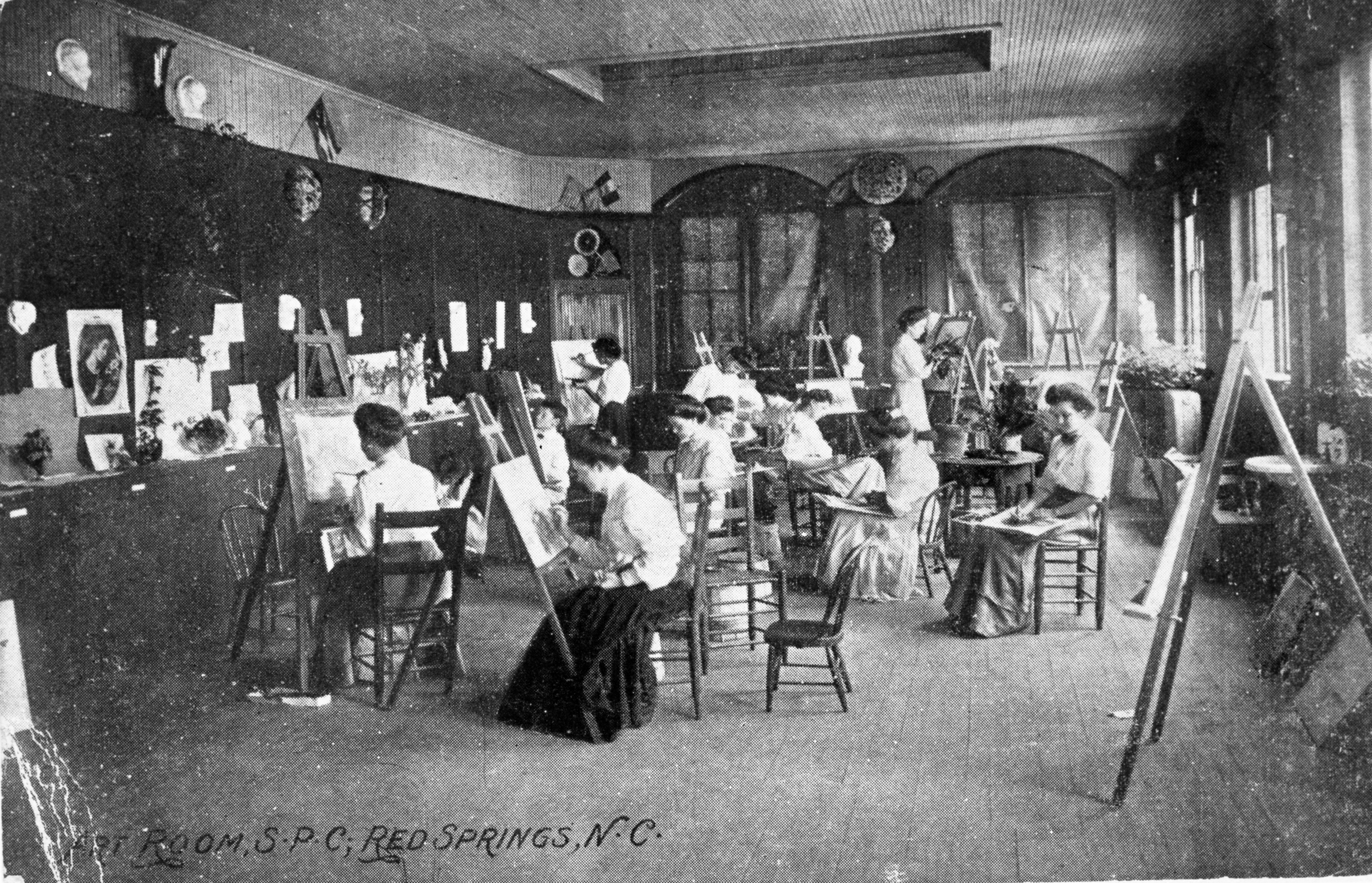
Art class, 1908

As a result of a 1952 study of the Presbyterian Synod of North Carolina the college was merged with Presbyterian Junior College of Maxton, North Carolina to form a four-year, coeducational college located elsewhere. Flora Macdonald College closed in 1961. From 1964 through 1974 the Flora Macdonald campus was occupied by Vardell Hall, a girls preparatory school and junior college. Since 1974, the campus has been home to Flora Macdonald Academy, a K–12 private preparatory day school.

== Notable alumnae ==
- Josephine McDonald Yarbrough, writer and clubwoman
