= Kossuth, Mississippi =

- Village
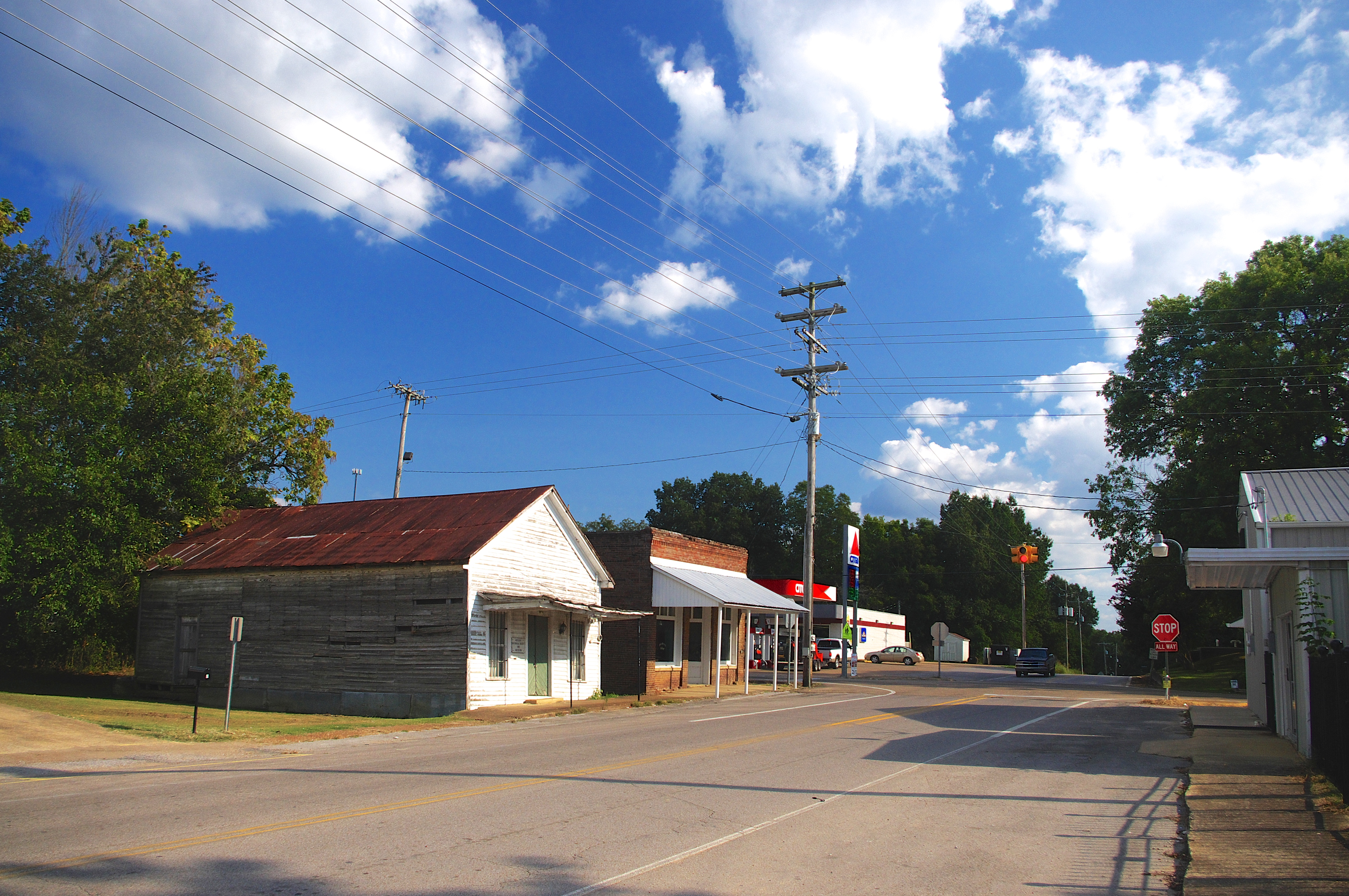
- Buildings along County Road 604

- Location of Kossuth, Mississippi

- Location in Mississippi Kossuth, Mississippi (the United States)
- Coordinates: 34°52′30″N 88°38′34″W
- Country: United States
- State: Mississippi
- County: Alcorn

Area
  - Total: 0.97 sq mi (2.50 km^{2})
  - Land: 0.97 sq mi (2.50 km^{2})
  - Water: 0.0039 sq mi (0.01 km^{2})
- Elevation: 479 ft (146 m)

Population (2020)
  - Total: 160
  - Density: 165.9/sq mi (64.05/km^{2})
- Time zone: UTC-6 (Central (CST))
  - Summer (DST): UTC-5 (CDT)
- ZIP code: 38834
- Area code: 662
- FIPS code: 28-38360
- GNIS feature ID: 2407487

Kossuth is a village in Alcorn County, Mississippi, United States. The population was 160 at the 2020 census.

== History ==
Kossuth, located about 10 miles (16 km) southwest of Corinth, was founded in the 1840s as "New Hope". In 1852, the town changed its name to Kossuth in honor of Lajos Kossuth, a Hungarian revolutionary hero who led the democratic, anti-Habsburg Hungarian Revolution of 1848.

== Geography ==
According to the United States Census Bureau, the village has a total area of 1.0 square mile (2.6 km^{2}), all land. The village is concentrated around the intersection of Mississippi Highway 2 (Kossuth Road) and County Road 604 southwest of Corinth. MS 2 connects Kossuth with U.S. Route 72 on the outskirts of Corinth. Wheeler Grove Road connects the village with U.S. Route 45 near Rienzi to the southeast.

=== Nearby communities ===
- Corinth – 8 miles (13 km)
- Rienzi- 10 miles (16 km)

== Demographics ==
Historical population
Census	Pop.	Note	%±
1890	165		—
1900	162		−1.8%
1910	193		19.1%
1920	247		28.0%
1930	224		−9.3%
1940	238		6.3%
1950	242		1.7%
1960	178		−26.4%
1970	227		27.5%
1980	190		−16.3%
1990	245		28.9%
2000	170		−30.6%
2010	209		22.9%
2020	160		−23.4%
U.S. Decennial Census

As of the census of 2000, there were 170 people, 14 households, and 5 families residing in the village. The population density was 177.2 inhabitants per square mile (68.4/km^{2}). There were 77 housing units at an average density of 80.3 per square mile (31.0/km^{2}). The racial makeup of the village was 98.82% White, 0.59% Native American, and 0.59% from two or more races. Hispanic or Latino of any race were 3.53% of the population.

There were 73 households, out of which 26.0% had children under the age of 18 living with them, 74.0% were married couples living together, 1.4% had a female householder with no husband present, and 21.9% were non-families. 20.5% of all households were made up of individuals, and 11.0% had someone living alone who was 65 years of age or older. The average household size was 2.33 and the average family size was 2.67.

In the village, the population was spread out, with 18.2% under the age of 18, 4.7% from 18 to 24, 25.9% from 25 to 44, 34.7% from 45 to 64, and 16.5% who were 65 years of age or older. The median age was 46 years. For every 100 females, there were 109.9 males. For every 100 females age 18 and over, there were 98.6 males.

The median income for a household in the village was $38,750, and the median income for a family was $40,714. Males had a median income of $29,875 versus $23,750 for females. The per capita income for the village was $21,131. About 2.9% of families and 3.2% of the population were below the poverty line, including none of those under the age of eighteen and 9.1% of those 65 or over.

== Education ==
The village of Kossuth is served by the Alcorn School District.

=== Libraries ===
- Rienzi Public Library – a branch of the Northeast Regional Library System and Kossuth High School Library – a branch of the school that resides in this area.

== Infrastructure ==
- Mississippi Highway 2

== Notable people ==
- Bill G. Lowrey, politician
- Mark Perrin Lowrey, Confederate general
- Rubel Phillips, politician
- Thomas Hal Phillips, writer

== Sources ==
- Brieger, James. Hometown, Mississippi. (1997); ISBN 1-886017-27-1
