= Josephine McDonald Yarbrough =

American newspaper writer

- Born: Josephine McDonald; August 28, 1879; Ashland, Mississippi, U.S.
- Died: November 5, 1961 (aged 82); Charlotte, North Carolina, U.S.
- Resting place: Elmwood Cemetery
- Education: Flora MacDonald College
- Occupation: writer
- Spouse: Joel Alexander Yarbrough
- Children: 2

Josephine McDonald Yarbrough (August 28, 1879 – November 5, 1961), better known as Mrs. J.A. Yarbrough, was an American newspaper writer and clubwoman.

== Early life and education ==
Yarbrough was born Josephine McDonald on August 28, 1879, in Ashland, Mississippi to James McLeod McDonald and Emma Josephine McDonald. She received her education at Flora MacDonald College in Red Springs, North Carolina.

== Adult life ==
After completing her studies at Flora MacDonald College, she moved to Radford, Virginia, where she met Joel Alexander Yarbrough, a graduate of the Virginia Polytechnic Institute who was employed at a bank. The married on December 11, 1901, and had two sons. They moved to Charlotte, North Carolina, where her husband founded a coal and ice company and developed a dairy store chain.

Yarbrough wrote stories, mainly historical in nature, for The Charlotte Observer, including the series Interesting Carolinians. Sometimes this column was also referred to as Interesting Carolina People. She also wrote about local and regional affairs.

She was a prominent clubwoman and held office in various women's organizations including the Daughters of the American Revolution, the Daughters of the American Colonists, the United Daughters of the Confederacy, the Young Women's Christian Association, the Charlotte Woman's Club. She was also an active member of the Society for the Preservation of Antiquities and served as a board director for the Florence Crittenton Home.

Yarbrough was a member of Myers Park Baptist Church in the Myers Park Neighborhood.
