= 2008 Mississippi Democratic presidential primary =

- March 11, 2008

40 Democratic National Convention delegates (33 pledged, 7 unpledged)

Candidate	Barack Obama	Hillary Clinton
Home state	Illinois	New York
Delegate count	20	13
Popular vote	265,502	159,221
Percentage	61.15%	36.67%
- County results Obama: 50–60% 60–70% 70–80% 80–90% Clinton: 50–60% 60–70% 70–80% 80–90%

The 2008 Mississippi Democratic presidential primary took place on March 11, 2008, with 33 delegates at stake. The winner in each of Mississippi's four congressional districts was awarded all of that district's delegates, totaling 22. Another 11 delegates were awarded to the statewide winner, Barack Obama. The 33 delegates represented Mississippi at the Democratic National Convention in Denver, Colorado. Seven other unpledged delegates, known as superdelegates, also attended the convention and cast their votes as well.

== Polls ==
A poll of likely voters on March 9, 2008, showed Barack Obama leading Hillary Clinton 54% to 37% with 9% undecided.

== Results ==
Mississippi Democratic Presidential Primary Results – 2008
Party	Candidate	Votes	Percentage	Delegates
Democratic	Barack Obama	265,502	61.15%	20
Democratic	Hillary Clinton	159,221	36.67%	13
Democratic	John Edwards	3,933	0.91%	0
Democratic	Joe Biden	1,816	0.42%	0
Democratic	Bill Richardson	1,396	0.32%	0
Democratic	Dennis Kucinich	912	0.21%	0
Democratic	Christopher Dodd	739	0.17%	0
Democratic	Mike Gravel	591	0.14%	0
Democratic	Uncommitted	42	0.01%	0
Totals		434,152	100.00%	33
Voter turnout		%		—

== Analysis ==
Mississippi, with its heavily African American population, gave Barack Obama a large victory over Hillary Clinton by an almost two-to-one margin. According to exit polls, 50 percent of voters in the Mississippi Democratic Primary were African Americans and they opted for Obama by a margin of 92-8 compared to the 48 percent of Caucasian voters who backed Clinton by a margin of 70-26. Obama won all age groups, educational attainment levels and socioeconomic classes in Mississippi except senior citizens aged 65 and over who backed Clinton by a margin of 55-43. Obama won moderates and liberals, as well as self-identified Democrats by a margin of 67-30 and Independents by a 53-43 percent margin of victory. Clinton won conservatives and self-identified Republicans by a margin of 75-25. Obama also swept most major religious denominations – other Christians went for Obama 70-29; other religions 80-20; and atheists/agnostics 80-20 while Clinton won Protestants 56-39 and Roman Catholics 54-42.

Obama performed extremely well throughout the state of Mississippi and won over half of its counties. He performed best in the more rural parts of the state, especially in the Mississippi River Delta counties that are majority-black as well as Hinds County, which contains the state capital and largest city of Jackson and its suburbs which went largely for Obama. He also performed extremely well in Central Mississippi and Southern Mississippi, although the latter to a lesser extent. Clinton performed extremely well in rural counties that are predominantly white and politically conservative, especially in Northern Mississippi and Southern Mississippi along the Gulf Coast with the exceptions of the larger cities of Biloxi and Hattiesburg.

== See also ==
- Democratic Party (United States) presidential primaries, 2008
- Mississippi Republican primary, 2008
