= 2008 Mississippi Republican presidential primary =

- March 11, 2008
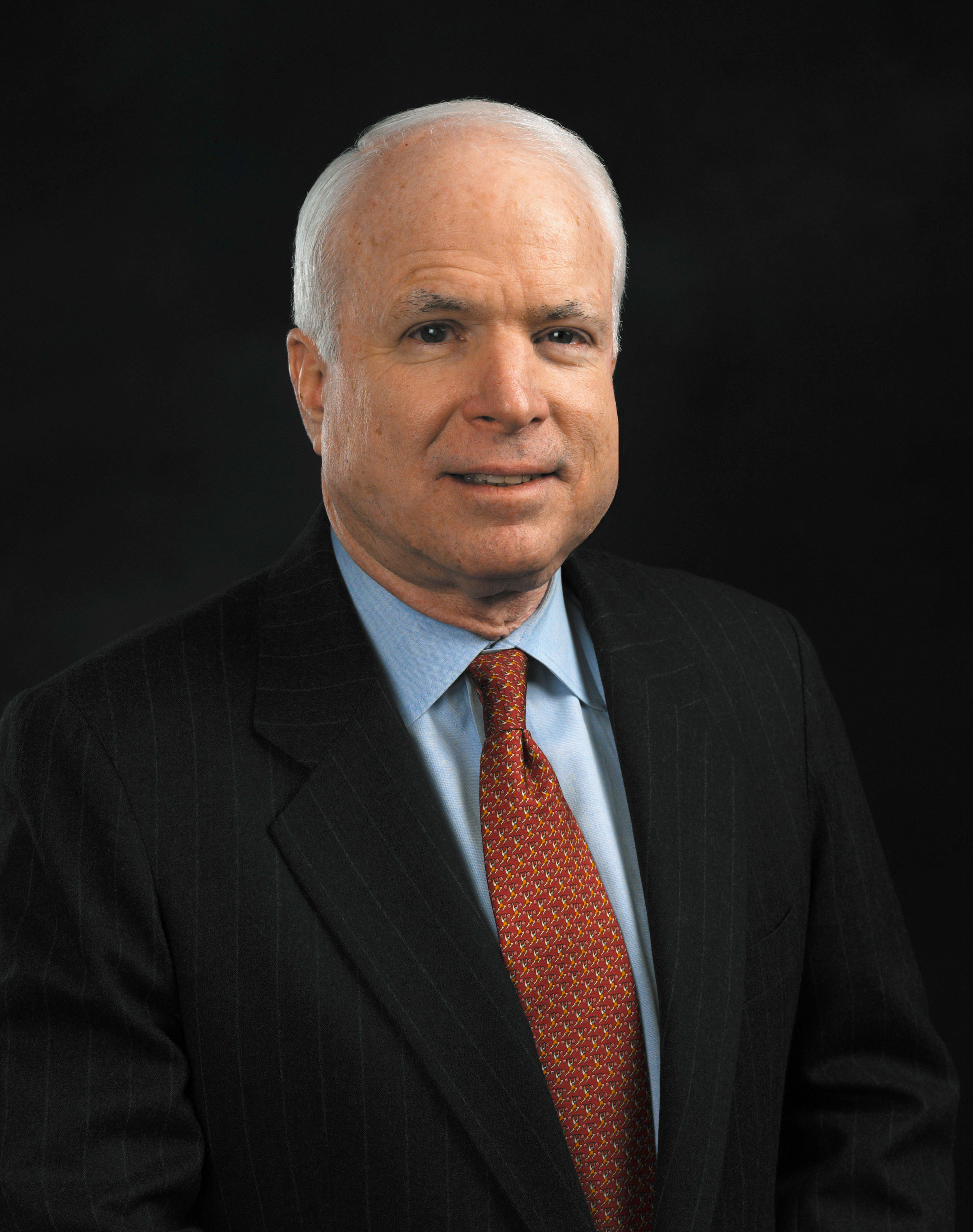

Candidate	John McCain	Mike Huckabee
Party	Republican	Republican
Home state	Arizona	Arkansas
Delegate count	36	0
Popular vote	113,074	17,943
Percentage	78.91%	12.52%
- Election results by county. John McCain

The 2008 Mississippi Republican presidential primary took place on March 11, 2008. The only candidates that were still in the race were Senator John McCain, Congressman Ron Paul, and Alan Keyes. John McCain easily won this primary.

== Results ==
Official Results
Candidate	Votes	Percentage	Delegates
John McCain	113,074	78.91%	36
Mike Huckabee*	17,943	12.52%	0
Ron Paul	5,510	3.85%	0
Mitt Romney*	2,177	1.52%	0
Fred Thompson*	2,160	1.51%	0
Rudy Giuliani*	945	0.66%	0
Alan Keyes	842	0.59%	0
Duncan Hunter*	414	0.29%	0
Tom Tancredo*	221	0.15%	0
Total	143,286	100%	36

* Candidate withdrew from the race before the primary

== See also ==
- Mississippi Democratic primary, 2008
- Republican Party (United States) presidential primaries, 2008
