= Michigan City, Mississippi =

- Unincorporated community
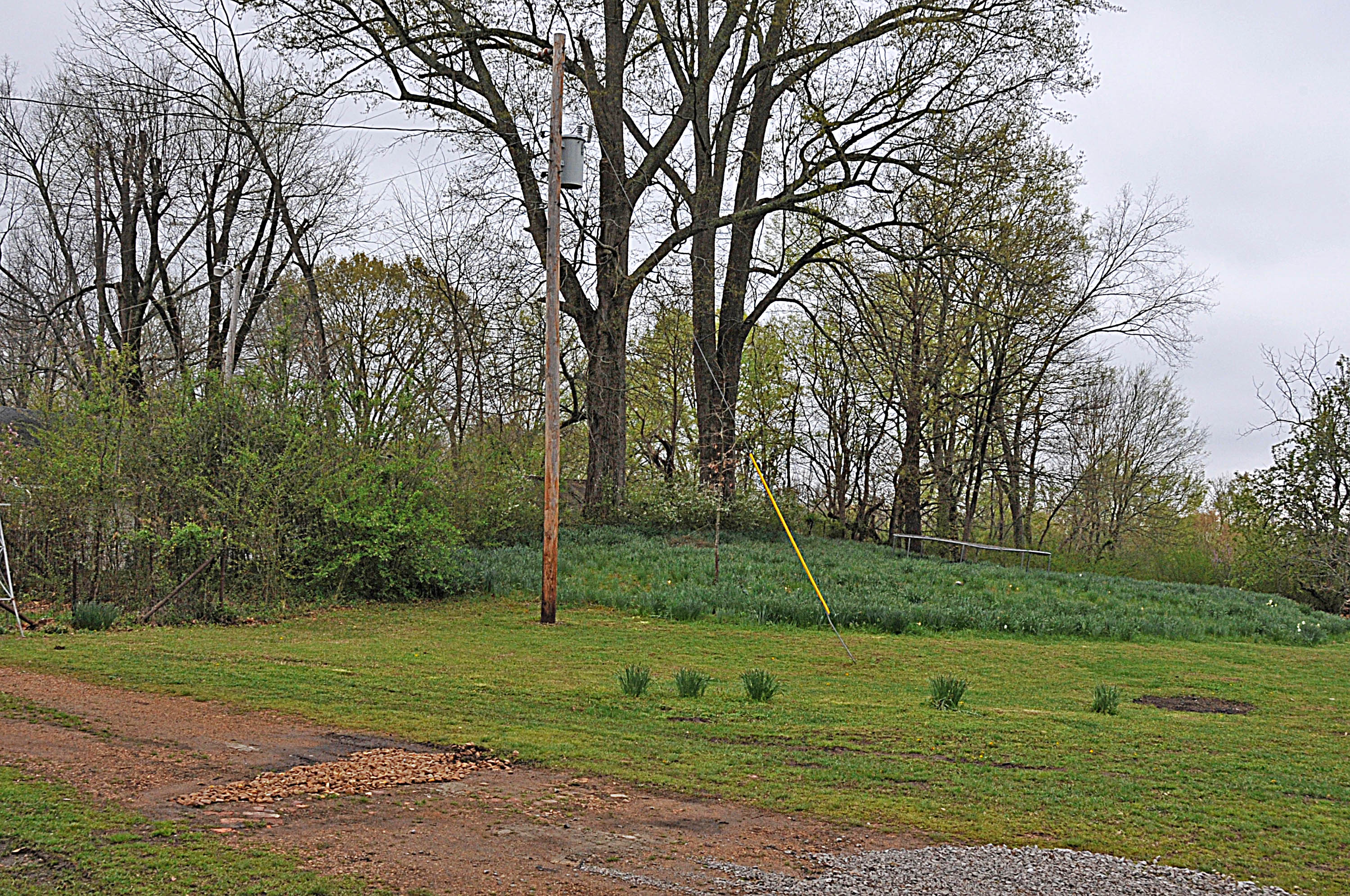
- Indian mound at Davis' Mills Battle Site

- Location within Mississippi Location within the United States
- Coordinates: 34°58′49″N 89°15′00″W
- Country: United States
- State: Mississippi
- County: Benton
- Elevation: 404 ft (123 m)
- Time zone: UTC-6 (Central (CST))
  - Summer (DST): UTC-5 (CDT)
- ZIP code: 38647
- Area code: 662
- GNIS feature ID: 693948

Michigan City, formerly known as Davis Mills, is an unincorporated community in Benton County, Mississippi, United States.

== History ==
The majority of the first settlers being natives of the state of Michigan caused the name to be selected. Michigan City was formerly home to a flour mill and lumber mill.

A post office operated under the name Davis Mills from 1871 to 1875 and first began operation under the name Michigan City in 1875.

Davis' Mills Battle Site, a Civil War battlefield listed on the National Register of Historic Places, is located in Michigan City.

== Geography ==
It is located along Mississippi Highway 7 in north central Benton County, just south of the Tennessee state line, approximately three miles north of U. S. Route 72.

Mississippi Highway 702 is called Main Street in Michigan City.

The nearly abandoned Mississippi Central Railroad, which is used only rarely for freight traffic, runs through Michigan City.
