= Benton County, Mississippi =

County in Mississippi, United States

- County
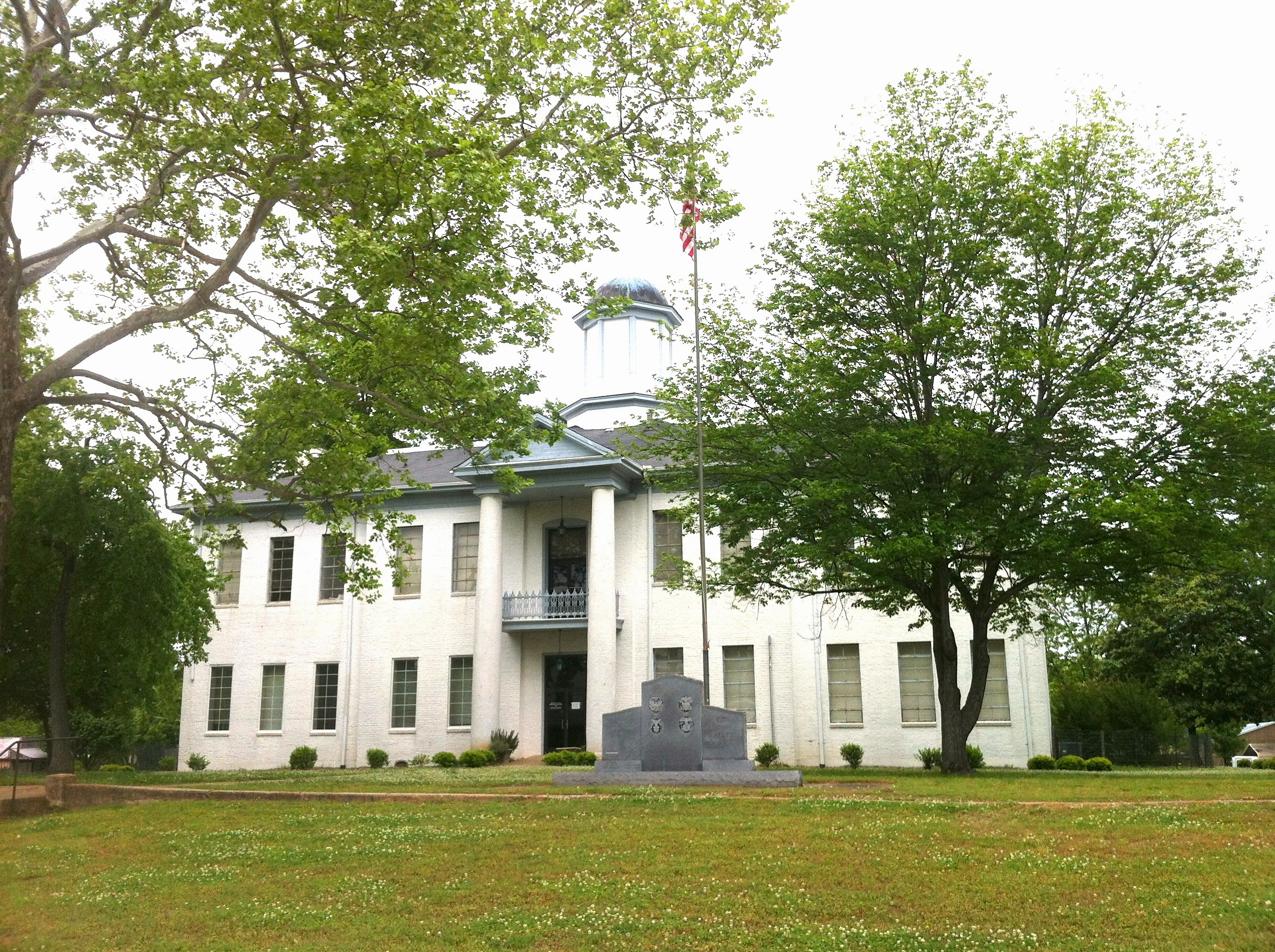
- The Old Benton County Courthouse in Ashland

- Location within the U.S. state of Mississippi
- Coordinates: 34°49′N 89°11′W
- Country: United States
- State: Mississippi
- Founded: 1870
- Named for: Samuel Benton
- Seat: Ashland
- Largest town: Ashland

Area
  - Total: 409 sq mi (1,060 km^{2})
  - Land: 407 sq mi (1,050 km^{2})
  - Water: 2.0 sq mi (5.2 km^{2}) 0.5%

Population (2020)
  - Total: 7,646
  - Estimate (2025): 7,502 ▼
  - Density: 18.8/sq mi (7.25/km^{2})
- Time zone: UTC−6 (Central)
  - Summer (DST): UTC−5 (CDT)
- Congressional district: 1st
- Website: bentoncountyms.gov

Benton County is a county located in the U.S. state of Mississippi. As of the 2020 census, the population was 7,646. Its county seat is Ashland. It is locally believed that residents convinced the post-Civil War Reconstruction government that Benton County was named after U.S. Senator Thomas Hart Benton, but the name actually honored Confederate Brigadier General Samuel Benton of nearby Holly Springs in Marshall County, nephew of the senator. Benton County is included in the Memphis, TN-MS-AR Metropolitan Statistical Area.

== Geography ==
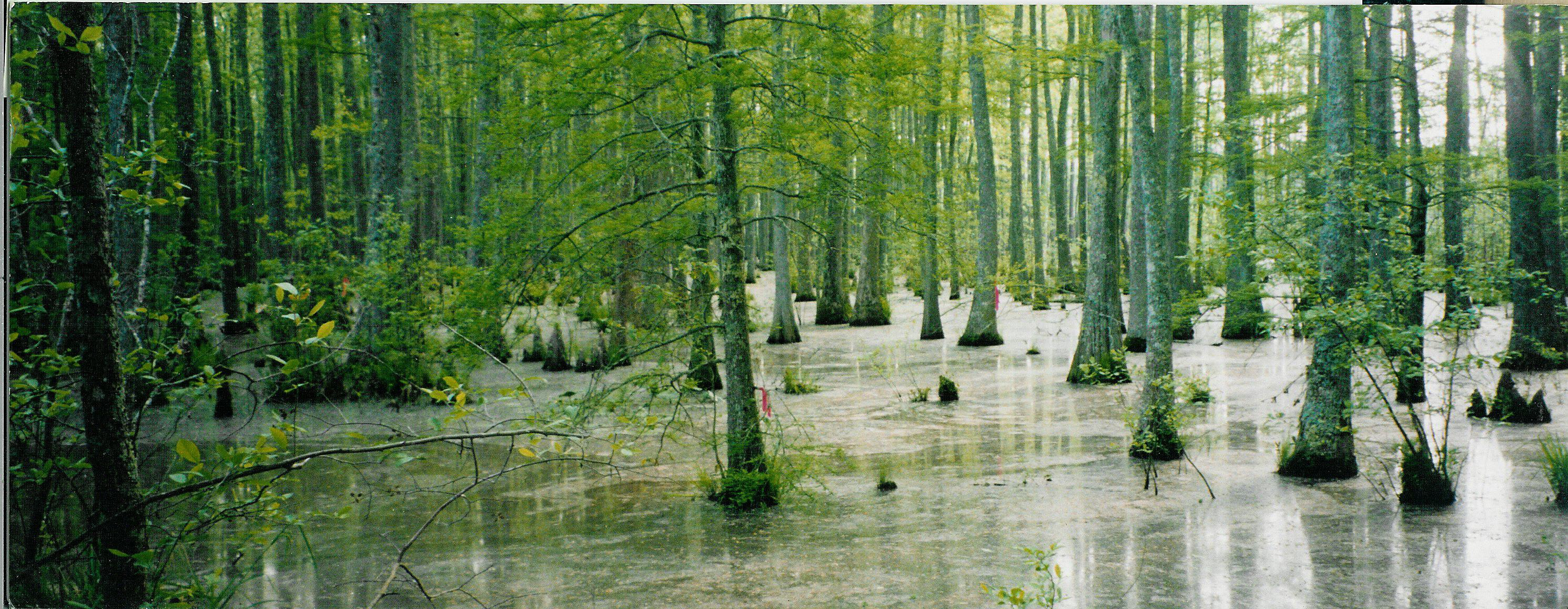
Bottomland hardwood swamp near Ashland, Mississippi

According to the U.S. Census Bureau, the county has a total area of 409 square miles (1,060 km^{2}), of which 407 square miles (1,050 km^{2}) is land and 2.0 square miles (5.2 km^{2}) (0.5%) is water. It is the fifth-smallest county by area in Mississippi.

The headwaters of the Wolf River meander and braid their way north and west across northern Benton County from Baker's Pond, the river's source spring (highest origin of continuous flow) in the Holly Springs National Forest approximately one mile southwest of where U.S. Highway 72 passes into Tippah County, Mississippi. The Wolf River passes into Fayette County, Tennessee between Michigan City (on the Mississippi side) and La Grange, Tennessee.

=== Major highways ===
- Interstate 22
- U.S. Route 72
- U.S. Route 78
- Mississippi Highway 2
- Mississippi Highway 4
- Mississippi Highway 5
- Mississippi Highway 7
- Mississippi Highway 178
- Mississippi Highway 370

=== Adjacent counties ===
- Hardeman County, Tennessee (northeast)
- Tippah County (east)
- Union County (south)
- Marshall County (west)
- Fayette County, Tennessee (northwest)

=== National protected area ===
- Holly Springs National Forest (part)

== Demographics ==
Historical population
Census	Pop.	Note	%±
1880	11,023		—
1890	10,585		−4.0%
1900	10,510		−0.7%
1910	10,245		−2.5%
1920	9,851		−3.8%
1930	9,813		−0.4%
1940	10,429		6.3%
1950	8,793		−15.7%
1960	7,723		−12.2%
1970	7,505		−2.8%
1980	8,153		8.6%
1990	8,046		−1.3%
2000	8,026		−0.2%
2010	8,729		8.8%
2020	7,646		−12.4%
2025 (est.)	7,502	▼	−1.9%
U.S. Decennial Census; 1790-1960 1900-1990; 1990-2000 2010-2013

=== Racial and ethnic composition ===
Benton County, Mississippi – Racial and ethnic composition Note: the US Census treats Hispanic/Latino as an ethnic category. This table excludes Latinos from the racial categories and assigns them to a separate category. Hispanics/Latinos may be of any race.
Race / Ethnicity (NH = Non-Hispanic)	Pop 1980	Pop 1990	Pop 2000	Pop 2010	Pop 2020	% 1980	% 1990	% 2000	% 2010	% 2020
White alone (NH)	5,027	4,849	4,936	5,229	4,565	61.66%	60.27%	61.50%	59.90%	59.70%
Black or African American alone (NH)	3,054	3,153	2,919	3,244	2,654	37.46%	39.19%	36.37%	37.16%	34.71%
Native American or Alaska Native alone (NH)	3	5	35	25	6	0.04%	0.06%	0.44%	0.29%	0.08%
Asian alone (NH)	1	2	4	6	1	0.01%	0.02%	0.05%	0.07%	0.01%
Native Hawaiian or Pacific Islander alone (NH)	x	x	1	1	0	x	x	0.01%	0.01%	0.00%
Other race alone (NH)	2	0	1	10	38	0.02%	0.00%	0.01%	0.11%	0.50%
Mixed race or Multiracial (NH)	x	x	46	66	237	x	x	0.57%	0.76%	3.10%
Hispanic or Latino (any race)	66	37	84	148	145	0.81%	0.46%	1.05%	1.70%	1.90%
Total	8,153	8,046	8,026	8,729	7,646	100.00%	100.00%	100.00%	100.00%	100.00%

=== 2020 census ===
As of the 2020 census, the county had a population of 7,646. The median age was 44.5 years. 20.5% of residents were under the age of 18 and 20.5% of residents were 65 years of age or older. For every 100 females there were 92.8 males, and for every 100 females age 18 and over there were 89.8 males age 18 and over.

The racial makeup of the county was 59.9% White, 34.9% Black or African American, 0.2% American Indian and Alaska Native, <0.1% Asian, <0.1% Native Hawaiian and Pacific Islander, 1.3% from some other race, and 3.6% from two or more races. Hispanic or Latino residents of any race comprised 1.9% of the population.

<0.1% of residents lived in urban areas, while 100.0% lived in rural areas.

There were 3,179 households in the county, of which 26.6% had children under the age of 18 living in them. Of all households, 40.4% were married-couple households, 21.6% were households with a male householder and no spouse or partner present, and 33.0% were households with a female householder and no spouse or partner present. About 32.2% of all households were made up of individuals and 15.2% had someone living alone who was 65 years of age or older.

There were 4,057 housing units, of which 21.6% were vacant. Among occupied housing units, 77.7% were owner-occupied and 22.3% were renter-occupied. The homeowner vacancy rate was 1.0% and the rental vacancy rate was 31.3%.

=== 2000 census ===
At the 2000 census, there were 8,026 people, 2,999 households and 2,216 families residing in the county. The population density was 20 per square mile (7.7/km^{2}). There were 3,456 housing units at an average density of 8 per square mile (3.1/km^{2}). The racial makeup of the county was 57.12% White (non-Hispanic), 39.76% Black or African American, 0.59% Native American, 0.05% Asian, 0.01% Pacific Islander, 0.29% from other races, and 0.59% from two or more races. 3.5% of the population were Hispanic or Latino of any race.

There were 2,999 households, of which 33.40% had children under the age of 18 living with them, 54.20% were married couples living together, 14.80% had a female householder with no husband present, and 26.10% were non-families. 23.80% of all households were made up of individuals, and 11.70% had someone living alone who was 65 years of age or older. The average household size was 2.64 and the average family size was 3.12.

Age distribution was 26.90% under the age of 18, 10.00% from 18 to 24, 25.80% from 25 to 44, 22.00% from 45 to 64, and 15.30% who were 65 years of age or older. The median age was 36 years. For every 100 females there were 94.60 males. For every 100 females age 18 and over, there were 91.80 males.

The median household income was $24,149, and the median family income was $29,907. Males had a median income of $26,291 versus $19,519 for females. The per capita income for the county was $12,212. About 19.20% of families and 23.20% of the population were below the poverty line, including 28.00% of those under age 18 and 24.80% of those age 65 or over.

== Communities ==
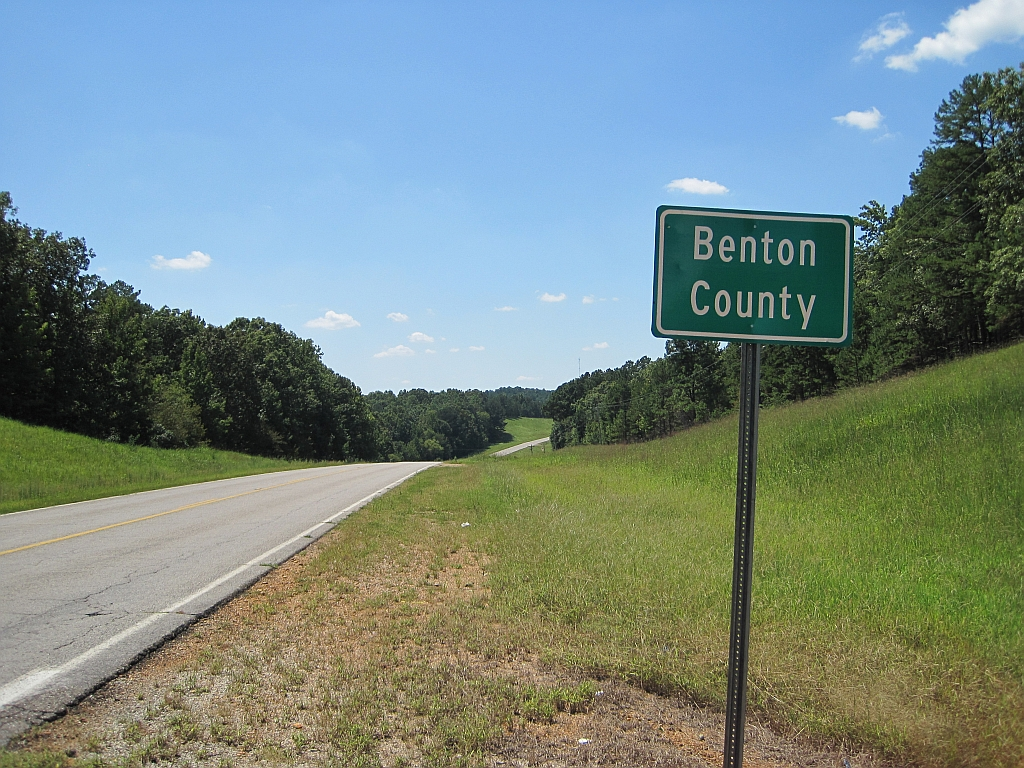
Sign when entering Benton County

=== Towns ===
- Ashland (county seat)
- Hickory Flat
- Snow Lake Shores

=== Census-designated place ===
- Lamar

=== Unincorporated places ===
- Canaan
- Hopewell
- Michigan City
- Winborn

=== Extinct town ===
- Salem

== Education ==
Benton County School District operates public schools.

From 1965 to the late 1980s, Benton County was also home to Gray's Academy, a private school located in Ashland.

== Notable people ==
- Norris C. Williamson, member of the Louisiana State Senate, 1916 to 1932; worked to eradicate the cattle tick pest, born in Benton County in 1874
- Floyd Lee (1933–2020), was a blues musician who was a founding member of Music Under New York, and later a judge on their board. He was born in Lamar.

== Politics ==
United States presidential election results for Benton County, Mississippi
Year	Republican		Democratic		Third party(ies)	
Year	No.	%	No.	%	No.	%
1912	18	3.33%	489	90.39%	34	6.28%
1916	38	5.03%	718	94.97%	0	0.00%
1920	124	23.18%	405	75.70%	6	1.12%
1924	35	6.04%	541	93.44%	3	0.52%
1928	47	5.60%	793	94.40%	0	0.00%
1932	8	0.97%	814	98.91%	1	0.12%
1936	10	0.58%	1,717	99.42%	0	0.00%
1940	24	2.50%	935	97.50%	0	0.00%
1944	42	4.70%	852	95.30%	0	0.00%
1948	11	1.36%	118	14.57%	681	84.07%
1952	216	18.32%	963	81.68%	0	0.00%
1956	108	11.44%	786	83.26%	50	5.30%
1960	175	16.04%	568	52.06%	348	31.90%
1964	934	79.83%	236	20.17%	0	0.00%
1968	185	6.94%	850	31.89%	1,630	61.16%
1972	1,483	66.35%	701	31.36%	51	2.28%
1976	790	24.62%	2,375	74.01%	44	1.37%
1980	1,254	36.59%	2,094	61.10%	79	2.31%
1984	1,737	50.12%	1,715	49.48%	14	0.40%
1988	1,565	47.30%	1,718	51.92%	26	0.79%
1992	1,253	31.68%	2,402	60.73%	300	7.59%
1996	993	31.36%	1,944	61.40%	229	7.23%
2000	1,561	44.84%	1,886	54.18%	34	0.98%
2004	1,969	46.36%	2,245	52.86%	33	0.78%
2008	2,329	50.22%	2,227	48.02%	82	1.77%
2012	2,041	49.59%	2,051	49.83%	24	0.58%
2016	2,251	56.09%	1,719	42.84%	43	1.07%
2020	2,570	59.92%	1,679	39.15%	40	0.93%
2024	2,535	65.34%	1,318	33.97%	27	0.70%

In presidential elections, Benton County was historically a 'Solid South' county for most of the 20th century, voting Republican only in the Nixon and Reagan landslides of 1972 and 1984, as well as for Goldwater in 1964. It also voted for third-party candidates Strom Thurmond in 1948 and George Wallace in 1968, instead of for the regular Democratic tickets. In the 21st century, it has trended Republican. In 2008, it was one of forty-four counties to switch from John Kerry to John McCain. It was the only one of these forty-four to flip to Obama in 2012, in kind with a scattering of counties in or near the Black Belt, but Trump carried it in 2016 with 56%, the highest vote share the county had given any nominee since 1996. In 2020, Trump improved his vote share in the county by 3.8%, approaching 60% even as he lost nationally.

Benton is a dry county, where the sale of alcoholic beverages is prohibited. As of August 2025, it is the last remaining county in Mississippi where there are no exceptions to the ban on alcohol sales, with all others having at least one municipality or designated resort area where liquor can be sold. The county has held its dry status since 1966, when Mississippi ended its alcohol ban on the state level and allowed each county to decide whether to be dry or wet in a referendum. Benton County voted dry by a margin of 943 to 581 in its 1966 referendum. In 2012, Ashland became the first and only city in Mississippi that voted to remain dry, after a change in state law allowed county seat cities to hold a referendum on the issue separately from the surrounding county.

== See also ==
- Dry counties
- National Register of Historic Places listings in Benton County, Mississippi
