= Blue Mountain, Mississippi =

- Town
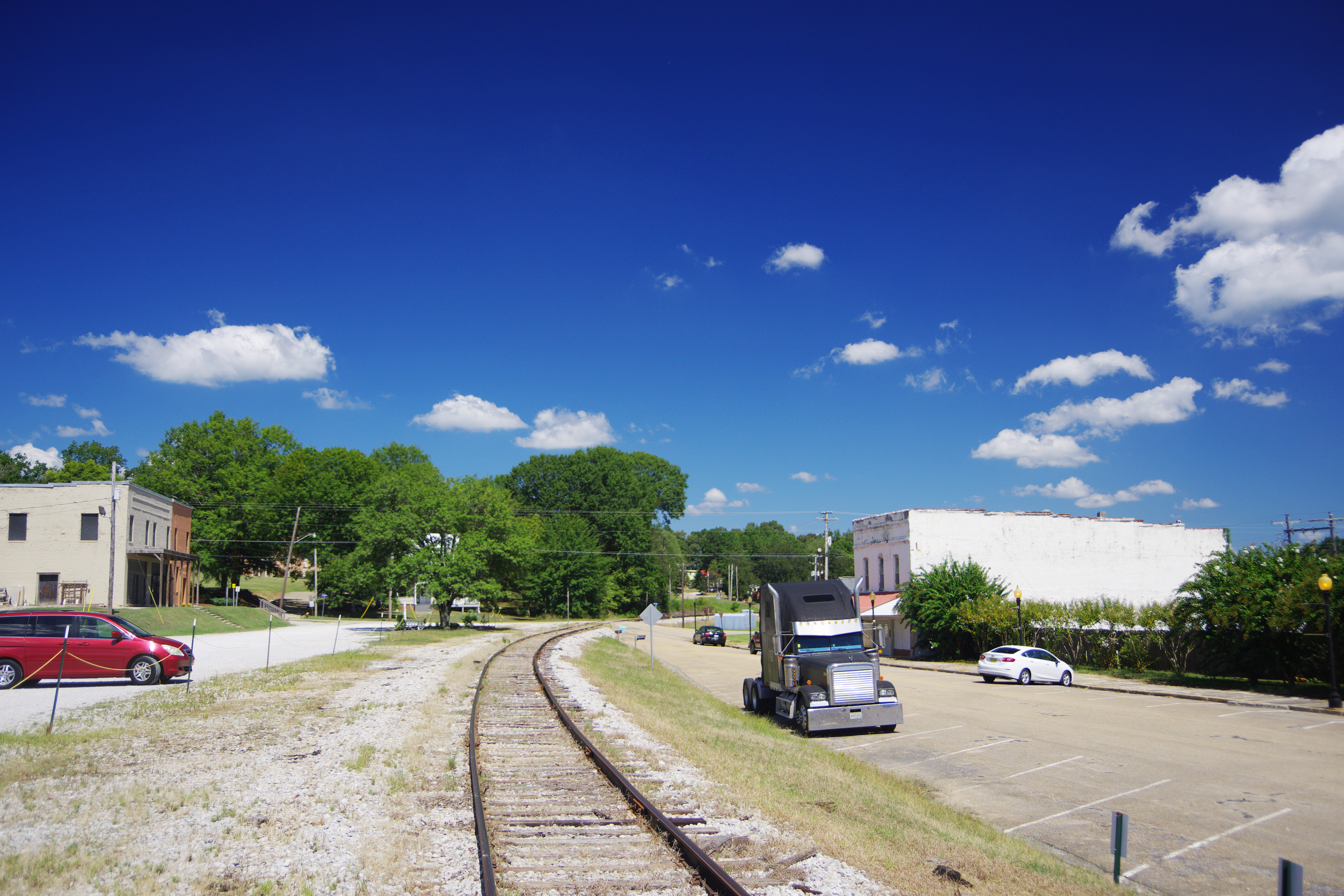
- Blue Mountain

- Location of Blue Mountain, Mississippi

- Location in the United States
- Coordinates: 34°40′26″N 89°01′34″W
- Country: United States
- State: Mississippi
- County: Tippah

Area
  - Total: 1.65 sq mi (4.28 km^{2})
  - Land: 1.64 sq mi (4.26 km^{2})
  - Water: 0.0077 sq mi (0.02 km^{2})
- Elevation: 472 ft (144 m)

Population (2020)
  - Total: 948
  - Density: 577.0/sq mi (222.78/km^{2})
- Time zone: UTC-6 (Central (CST))
  - Summer (DST): UTC-5 (CDT)
- ZIP code: 38610
- Area code: 662
- FIPS code: 28-07060
- GNIS feature ID: 2405284

Blue Mountain is a village in Tippah County, Mississippi, United States. The population was 926 at the 2023 census.

== History ==
Blue Mountain is rooted in the community that developed around Blue Mountain Christian University, which was founded in 1873. The Town of Blue Mountain was incorporated in 1877. The name refers to the blueish morning hue of the surrounding hills.

== Geography ==
Blue Mountain lies in southwestern Tippah County at the intersection of Mississippi Highway 2 and Mississippi Highway 15. The latter highway connects the town with Ripley to the northeast and New Albany to the south, while the former highway connects the town with Hickory Flat to the west.

According to the United States Census Bureau, the town has a total area of 1.1 square miles (2.8 km^{2}), all land.

== Demographics ==
Historical population
Census	Pop.	Note	%±
1880	156		—
1900	466		—
1910	650		39.5%
1920	654		0.6%
1930	569		−13.0%
1940	544		−4.4%
1950	875		60.8%
1960	741		−15.3%
1970	677		−8.6%
1980	867		28.1%
1990	667		−23.1%
2000	670		0.4%
2010	920		37.3%
2020	948		3.0%
U.S. Decennial Census

As of the census of 2000, there were 670 people, 241 households, and 161 families residing in the town. The population density was 580.8 inhabitants per square mile (224.2/km^{2}). There were 268 housing units at an average density of 232.3 per square mile (89.7/km^{2}). The racial makeup of the town was 82.84% White, 13.73% African American, 0.45% Native American, 0.45% Asian, 1.94% from other races, and 0.60% from two or more races. Hispanic or Latino of any race were 3.73% of the population.

There were 241 households, out of which 33.2% had children under the age of 18 living with them, 51.0% were married couples living together, 12.4% had a female householder with no husband present, and 32.8% were non-families. 28.2% of all households were made up of individuals, and 12.9% had someone living alone who was 65 years of age or older. The average household size was 2.48 and the average family size was 3.00.

In the town, the population was spread out, with 24.2% under the age of 18, 21.0% from 18 to 24, 22.7% from 25 to 44, 19.3% from 45 to 64, and 12.8% who were 65 years of age or older. The median age was 29 years. For every 100 females, there were 78.2 males. For every 100 females age 18 and over, there were 76.4 males.

The median income for a household in the town was $27,969, and the median income for a family was $40,833. Males had a median income of $28,661 versus $23,750 for females. The per capita income for the town was $12,870. About 17.3% of families and 20.6% of the population were below the poverty line, including 24.6% of those under age 18 and 25.3% of those age 65 or over.

== Education ==
The Town of Blue Mountain is served by the South Tippah School District.

Blue Mountain Christian University, a private liberal arts college supported by the Mississippi Baptist Convention is located there.

== Cultural references ==
Blue Mountain is the town where the character of Amanda Wingfield in Tennessee Williams' The Glass Menagerie recalls growing up.
