= Benton County School District =

School district in Mississippi

Address
- 231 Court Street Ashland, Benton County, Mississippi; United States

District information
- Schools: 4
- NCES District ID: 2800600

Students and staff
- Students: 909
- Teachers: 84.00 FTE
- Student–teacher ratio: 10.82

Other information
- Website: https://www.benton.k12.ms.us/

The Benton County School District is a public school district based in Ashland, Mississippi (USA). The district's boundaries parallel that of Benton County.

== History ==
Ashland Academy was established in Ashland in 1882. Reverend Enoch Wines was the school's first principal. W. P. Gunn also served as principal of the school.

F. S. Abney was Ashland High School's principal in 1915. After the school was integrated, many white students left the school.

As of 1965 the school calendar began in the mid-summer but then, in order to allow pupils to assist in the agricultural economy, dismissed for a month or longer in a "split session".

Segregated schools in the county were more equalized than in other places.

== Schools ==
- Ashland Middle/High School (Grades 7-12)
- Ashland Elementary School (Grades K-6)
- Hickory Flat Attendance Center (Grades K-12)

In 1964 (prior to the end of racial segregation) the district had a school for whites in Ashland, a school for whites in Hickory Flat, and a school for blacks in Old Salem. Unlike other areas, the Old Salem school, renovated in 1959, was at the time the school with the highest level of modernization, and there was less inequality between the white and black schools compared to other areas.

== Demographics ==
=== 2006-07 school year ===
There were a total of 1,340 students enrolled in the Benton County School District during the 2006–2007 school year. The gender makeup of the district was 50% female and 50% male. The racial makeup of the district was 52.01% African American, 46.34% White, 1.19% Hispanic, and 0.45% Asian. 87.2% of the district's students were eligible to receive free lunch.

=== Previous school years ===
School Year	Enrollment	Gender Makeup		Racial Makeup				
School Year	Enrollment	Female	Male	Asian	African American	Hispanic	Native American	White
2005-06	1,346	48%	52%	0.67%	53.42%	1.93%	–	43.98%
2004-05	1,339	48%	52%	–	57.06%	1.94%	–	41.00%
2003-04	1,309	48%	52%	–	57.83%	1.53%	–	40.64%
2002-03	1,254	47%	53%	–	59.72%	1.67%	–	38.60%

== Accountability statistics ==
	2006-07	2005-06	2004-05	2003-04	2002-03
District Accreditation Status	Accredited	Accredited	Accredited	Accredited	Accredited
School Performance Classifications
Level 5 (Superior Performing) Schools	0	0	0	0	0
Level 4 (Exemplary) Schools	2	1	0	1	0
Level 3 (Successful) Schools	1	2	2	2	3
Level 2 (Under Performing) Schools	0	0	1	0	0
Level 1 (Low Performing) Schools	0	0	0	0	0
Not Assigned	0	0	0	0	0

== See also ==
- List of school districts in Mississippi
