= Roscoe Turner Airport =

- IATA: CRX; ICAO: KCRX; FAA LID: CRX

Summary
- Airport type: Public
- Owner: City of Corinth - Alcorn County
- Serves: Corinth, Mississippi
- Elevation AMSL: 425 ft / 130 m
- Coordinates: 34°54′54″N 088°36′13″W
- Interactive map of Roscoe Turner Airport

Runways
Direction	Length		Surface
Direction	ft	m	Surface
18/36	6,500	1,981	Asphalt

Statistics (2009)
- Aircraft operations: 16,400
- Based aircraft: 16
- Source: Federal Aviation Administration

Roscoe Turner Airport (IATA: CRX, ICAO: KCRX, FAA LID: CRX) is a public-use airport located four nautical miles (7 km) southwest of the central business district of Corinth, a city in Alcorn County, Mississippi, United States. It is owned by the City of Corinth and Alcorn County. This airport is included in the FAA's National Plan of Integrated Airport Systems for 2009–2013, which categorized it as a general aviation facility.

== Facilities and aircraft ==
Roscoe Turner Airport covers an area of 542 acres (219 ha) at an elevation of 425 feet (130 m) above mean sea level. It has one runway designated 18/36 with an asphalt surface measuring 6,500 by 100 feet (1,981 x 30 m).

For the 12-month period ending October 29, 2009, the airport had 16,400 aircraft operations, an average of 44 per day: 98% general aviation and 2% military. At that time there were 16 aircraft based at this airport: 62.5% single-engine, 25% multi-engine and 12.5% ultralight.

== Accidents and incidents ==
- On December 24, 2015 a single engine plane, registered to North Mississippi Pulmonology Clinic in Booneville crashed onto County Road 504 just before 10:30am. Four people were on board the aircraft. One was flown to a hospital in Memphis and the other three were sent to a local hospital in Corinth for observation.

== See also ==
- List of airports in Mississippi
