= Ashland, Mississippi =

- Town
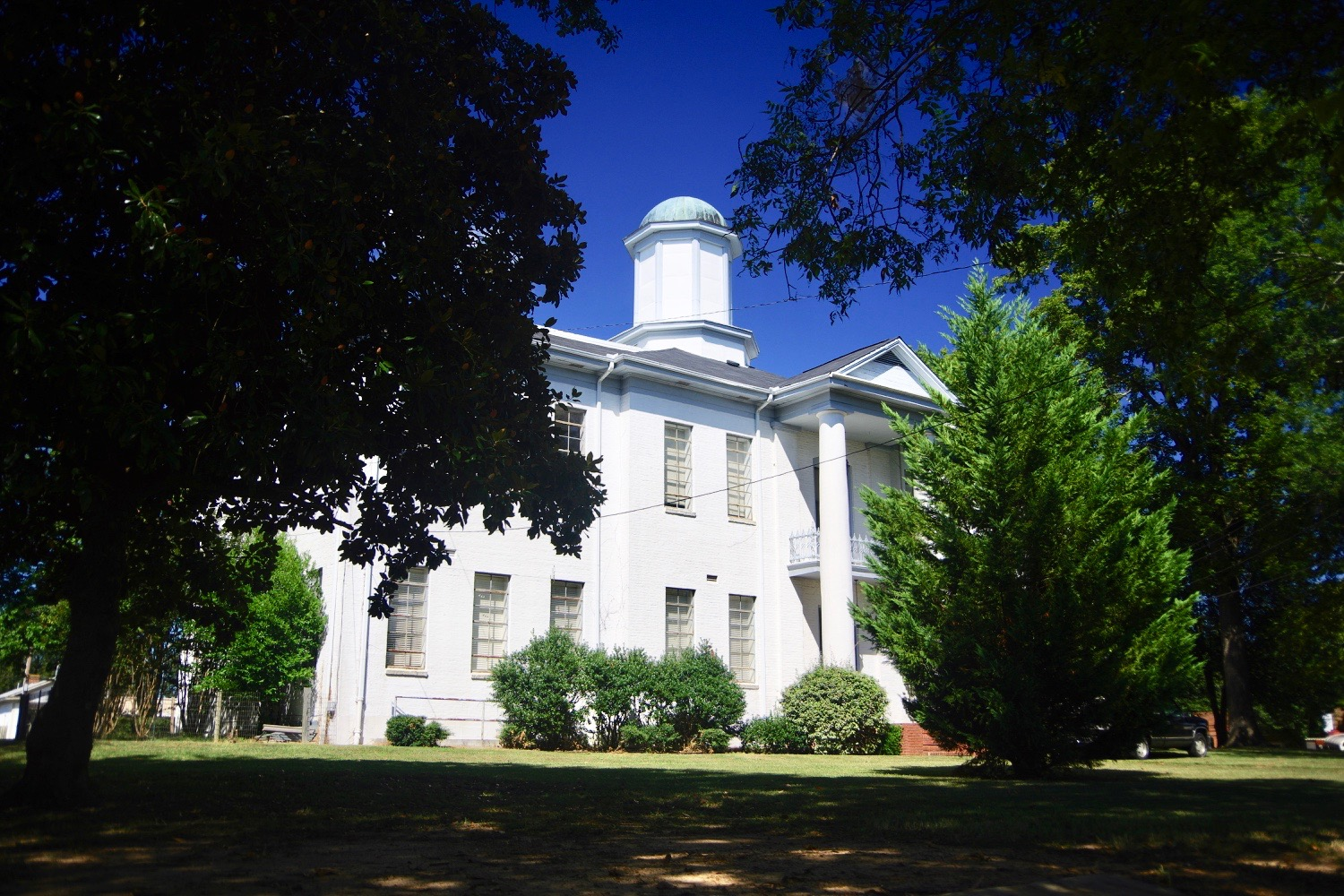
- Old Benton County Courthouse (2018)

- Flag
- Motto: "Small Town Living, Big City Pride"
- Location of Ashland, Mississippi

- Location in Mississippi Ashland (the United States) Ashland (North America)
- Coordinates: 34°50′03″N 89°10′40″W
- Country: United States
- State: Mississippi
- County: Benton

Area
  - Total: 1.82 sq mi (4.72 km^{2})
  - Land: 1.82 sq mi (4.72 km^{2})
  - Water: 0 sq mi (0.00 km^{2})
- Elevation: 646 ft (197 m)

Population (2020)
  - Total: 551
  - Density: 302.0/sq mi (116.62/km^{2})
- Time zone: UTC-6 (Central (CST))
  - Summer (DST): UTC-5 (CDT)
- ZIP code: 38603
- Area code: 662
- FIPS code: 28-02140
- GNIS feature ID: 2405174
- Website: www.ashland.ms

Ashland is a town in Benton County, Mississippi, United States and the county seat. The population was 551 at the 2020 census, down from 569 at the 2010 census. Ashland was incorporated on March 8, 1871, and has a Mayor-Aldermen form of government.

== History ==
Ashland was established in 1871 as the county seat for the Benton County, which had been created the previous year. The Benton County Courthouse, the focus of the town's main square, was constructed in 1873. Many of Ashland's earliest residents had relocated from Salem, an older community to the west that had been destroyed during the Civil War.

== Geography ==
Ashland is 18 miles (29 km) east of Holly Springs. The town is concentrated along Mississippi Highway 370, east of its intersection with Mississippi Highway 5. The Tennessee border is 14 miles (23 km) to the north.

According to the United States Census Bureau, Ashland has a total area of 1.8 square miles (4.7 km^{2}), all land.

=== Climate ===
The climate in this area is characterized by hot, humid summers and generally mild to cool winters. According to the Köppen Climate Classification system, Ashland has a humid subtropical climate, abbreviated "Cfa" on climate maps.

Climate data for Ashland, Mississippi (1991–2020)
Month	Jan	Feb	Mar	Apr	May	Jun	Jul	Aug	Sep	Oct	Nov	Dec	Year
Mean daily maximum °F (°C)	49.0 (9.4)	53.7 (12.1)	62.3 (16.8)	71.5 (21.9)	79.2 (26.2)	86.0 (30.0)	88.8 (31.6)	89.2 (31.8)	84.4 (29.1)	73.5 (23.1)	61.4 (16.3)	52.0 (11.1)	70.9 (21.6)
Daily mean °F (°C)	38.9 (3.8)	42.9 (6.1)	50.9 (10.5)	60.0 (15.6)	68.8 (20.4)	76.0 (24.4)	79.0 (26.1)	78.1 (25.6)	72.3 (22.4)	61.2 (16.2)	49.6 (9.8)	42.1 (5.6)	60.0 (15.5)
Mean daily minimum °F (°C)	28.7 (−1.8)	32.1 (0.1)	39.4 (4.1)	48.4 (9.1)	58.3 (14.6)	66.0 (18.9)	69.1 (20.6)	67.1 (19.5)	60.2 (15.7)	48.9 (9.4)	37.8 (3.2)	32.2 (0.1)	49.0 (9.5)
Average precipitation inches (mm)	4.62 (117)	5.22 (133)	5.74 (146)	5.87 (149)	5.22 (133)	4.29 (109)	4.20 (107)	3.64 (92)	3.63 (92)	4.35 (110)	4.23 (107)	6.00 (152)	57.01 (1,447)
Average snowfall inches (cm)	1.0 (2.5)	0.7 (1.8)	0.3 (0.76)	0.0 (0.0)	0.0 (0.0)	0.0 (0.0)	0.0 (0.0)	0.0 (0.0)	0.0 (0.0)	0.0 (0.0)	0.0 (0.0)	0.0 (0.0)	2 (5.06)
Source: NOAA

== Demographics ==
Historical population
Census	Pop.	Note	%±
1880	174		—
1890	138		−20.7%
1900	162		17.4%
1910	146		−9.9%
1920	190		30.1%
1930	228		20.0%
1940	354		55.3%
1950	328		−7.3%
1960	309		−5.8%
1970	348		12.6%
1980	532		52.9%
1990	490		−7.9%
2000	577		17.8%
2010	569		−1.4%
2020	551		−3.2%
U.S. Decennial Census

=== 2000 census ===
As of the census of 2000, there were 577 people, 207 households, and 142 families residing in the town. The population density was 316.0 inhabitants per square mile (122.0/km^{2}). There were 227 housing units at an average density of 124.3 per square mile (48.0/km^{2}). The racial makeup of the town was 95.1% White, 0.8% African American, 0.5% Native American, 0.4% Asian, 0.2% from other races, and 3.1% from two or more races. Hispanic or Latino of any race were 1.7% of the population.

There were 207 households, out of which 25.6% had children under the age of 18 living with them, 55.1% were married couples living together, 11.6% had a female householder with no husband present, and 31.4% were non-families. 28.5% of all households were made up of individuals, and 17.4% had someone living alone who was 65 years of age or older. The average household size was 2.23 and the average family size was 2.68.

In the town, the population was spread out, with 15.9% under the age of 18, 8.7% from 18 to 24, 22.5% from 25 to 44, 21.8% from 45 to 64, and 31.0% who were 65 years of age or older. The median age was 47 years. For every 100 females, there were 83.8 males. For every 100 females age 18 and over, there were 87.3 males.

The median income for a household in the town was $28,088, and the median income for a family was $29,911. Males had a median income of $24,375 versus $20,455 for females. The per capita income for the town was $14,073. About 14.6% of families and 19.4% of the population were below the poverty line, including 30.2% of those under age 18 and 22.1% of those age 65 or over.

== Government ==
As of 2018, the mayor of Ashland is Mitch Carroll. Carroll was elected mayor in 2007 in a special election to fill the vacancy left by Bill Stone, who had been elected to the Mississippi State Senate. Carroll defeated his brother, Mike Carroll, by 17 votes to secure the position.

== Education ==
Ashland Academy was established in Ashland in 1882.

Ashland is served by the Benton County School District. Ashland High School is the public high school in Ashland and serves students from Benton County, Mississippi.

== Notable people ==
- Willie Mitchell, musician and owner of Hi Records
- Bill Renick, former Chief of Staff for Ronnie Musgrove
- Bill Stone, mayor of Ashland from 2001 to 2007
- Daniel B. Wright, U.S. Representative for Mississippi's 1st congressional district from 1853 to 1857
- Josephine McDonald Yarbrough, writer and clubwoman
