= Hickory Flat, Mississippi =

- Town
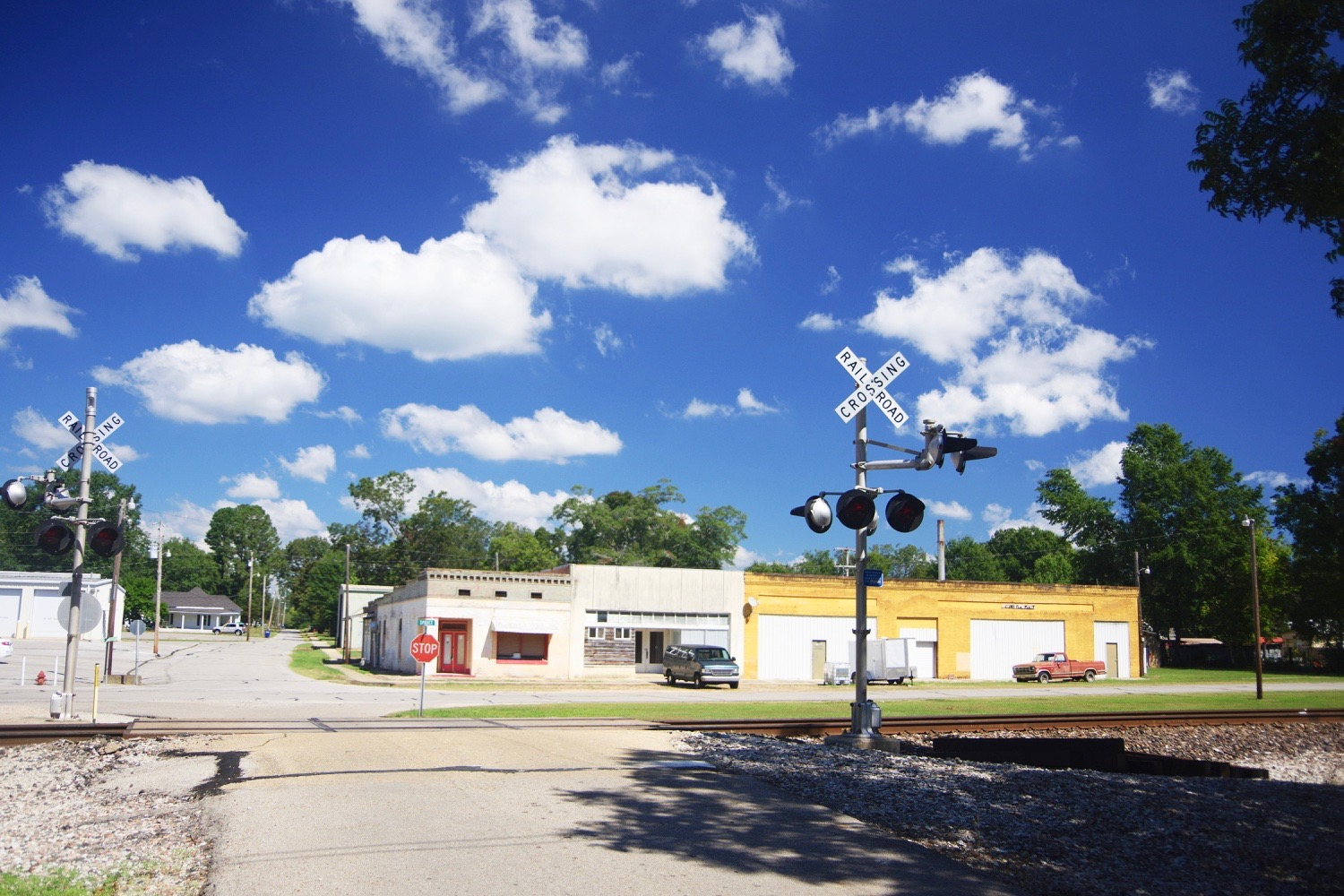
- Hickory Flat

- Location of Hickory Flat, Mississippi

- Location in the United States
- Coordinates: 34°36′57″N 89°11′29″W
- Country: United States
- State: Mississippi
- County: Benton

Area
  - Total: 0.96 sq mi (2.48 km^{2})
  - Land: 0.96 sq mi (2.48 km^{2})
  - Water: 0 sq mi (0.00 km^{2})
- Elevation: 423 ft (129 m)

Population (2020)
  - Total: 496
  - Density: 517.9/sq mi (199.96/km^{2})
- Time zone: UTC-6 (Central (CST))
  - Summer (DST): UTC-5 (CDT)
- ZIP code: 38633
- Area code: 662
- FIPS code: 28-32020
- GNIS feature ID: 2405823

Hickory Flat is a town in Benton County, Mississippi, United States. As of the 2020 census, Hickory Flat had a population of 496.

== History ==
Hickory Flat was named from a nearby grove of hickory trees.

In 1907, Hickory Flat was described as an incorporated postal town situated on the Kansas City, Memphis and Birmingham Railroad. In 1900, the town had two churches and a population of 204. The town's post office was established in 1839.

On June 18, 2025, the J. W. Crawford & Co. General Store at 1187 Spruce St. in Hickory Flat was listed on the National Register of Historic Places.

== Geography ==
U.S. Route 78, a freeway, serves the town via Exit 48. Mississippi Highway 178, following the former route of US 78, runs through the center of the town. Via US 78, it is 20 miles (32 km) northwest to Holly Springs, 65 miles (105 km) northwest to Memphis, 14 miles (23 km) southeast to New Albany, and 42 miles (68 km) southeast to Tupelo.

According to the United States Census Bureau, the town of Hickory Flat has a total area of 0.97 square miles (2.5 km^{2}), all land.

=== Climate ===
Climate data for Hickory Flat, Mississippi (1991–2020)
Month	Jan	Feb	Mar	Apr	May	Jun	Jul	Aug	Sep	Oct	Nov	Dec	Year
Mean daily maximum °F (°C)	50.7 (10.4)	54.2 (12.3)	63.6 (17.6)	72.7 (22.6)	80.0 (26.7)	87.2 (30.7)	89.7 (32.1)	90.0 (32.2)	84.8 (29.3)	74.6 (23.7)	62.4 (16.9)	53.1 (11.7)	71.9 (22.2)
Daily mean °F (°C)	39.2 (4.0)	42.4 (5.8)	50.7 (10.4)	59.7 (15.4)	68.2 (20.1)	75.9 (24.4)	78.8 (26.0)	78.2 (25.7)	72.1 (22.3)	60.9 (16.1)	49.5 (9.7)	42.1 (5.6)	59.8 (15.5)
Mean daily minimum °F (°C)	27.7 (−2.4)	30.7 (−0.7)	37.8 (3.2)	46.7 (8.2)	56.3 (13.5)	64.6 (18.1)	67.9 (19.9)	66.5 (19.2)	59.3 (15.2)	47.3 (8.5)	36.5 (2.5)	31.1 (−0.5)	47.7 (8.7)
Average precipitation inches (mm)	5.07 (129)	5.51 (140)	5.73 (146)	5.61 (142)	5.30 (135)	4.99 (127)	4.56 (116)	3.93 (100)	3.99 (101)	3.65 (93)	4.07 (103)	6.21 (158)	58.62 (1,490)
Average snowfall inches (cm)	1.2 (3.0)	1.1 (2.8)	0.2 (0.51)	0.0 (0.0)	0.0 (0.0)	0.0 (0.0)	0.0 (0.0)	0.0 (0.0)	0.0 (0.0)	0.0 (0.0)	0.0 (0.0)	0.1 (0.25)	2.6 (6.56)
Source: NOAA

== Demographics ==
Historical population
Census	Pop.	Note	%±
1890	293		—
1900	204		−30.4%
1910	261		27.9%
1920	269		3.1%
1930	337		25.3%
1940	352		4.5%
1950	345		−2.0%
1960	344		−0.3%
1970	354		2.9%
1980	458		29.4%
1990	535		16.8%
2000	565		5.6%
2010	601		6.4%
2020	496		−17.5%
U.S. Decennial Census

=== 2020 census ===
Hickory Flat racial composition (NH = Non-Hispanic) (Note: Note: the US Census treats Hispanic/Latino as an ethnic category. This table excludes Latinos from the racial categories and assigns them to a separate category. Hispanics/Latinos can be of any race.)
Race	Number	Percentage
White (NH)	402	81.05%
Black or African American (NH)	85	17.14%
Mixed/Multi-Racial (NH)	3	0.6%
Hispanic or Latino	6	1.21%
Total	496	

As of the 2020 United States census, there were 496 people, 234 households, and 146 families residing in the town.

=== 2000 census ===
As of the census of 2000, there were 565 people, 221 households, and 161 families residing in the town. The population density was 611.5 inhabitants per square mile (236.1/km^{2}). There were 242 housing units at an average density of 261.9 per square mile (101.1/km^{2}). The racial makeup of the town was 86.19% White, 12.74% African American, 0.71% Native American, and 0.35% from two or more races. Hispanic or Latino of any race were 0.18% of the population.

There were 221 households, out of which 37.6% had children under the age of 18 living with them, 54.8% were married couples living together, 13.6% had a female householder with no husband present, and 27.1% were non-families. 25.3% of all households were made up of individuals, and 13.6% had someone living alone who was 65 years of age or older. The average household size was 2.56 and the average family size was 3.06.

In the town, the population was spread out, with 29.2% under the age of 18, 12.4% from 18 to 24, 27.1% from 25 to 44, 17.7% from 45 to 64, and 13.6% who were 65 years of age or older. The median age was 31 years. For every 100 females there were 78.8 males. For every 100 females age 18 and over, there were 76.2 males.

The median income for a household in the town was $24,141, and the median income for a family was $30,385. Males had a median income of $27,321 versus $18,438 for females. The per capita income for the town was $12,392. About 18.4% of families and 17.4% of the population were below the poverty line, including 16.2% of those under age 18 and 10.7% of those age 65 or over.

== Education ==
Hickory Flat is served by the Benton County School District.

== Climate ==
The climate in this area is characterized by hot, humid summers and generally mild to cool winters. According to the Köppen Climate Classification system, Hickory Flat has a humid subtropical climate, abbreviated "Cfa" on climate maps.

== Notable native ==
- Elder Roma Wilson, gospel singer and harmonicist.
