= List of United States tornadoes from November to December 2019 =

United States tornadoes from November to December 2019
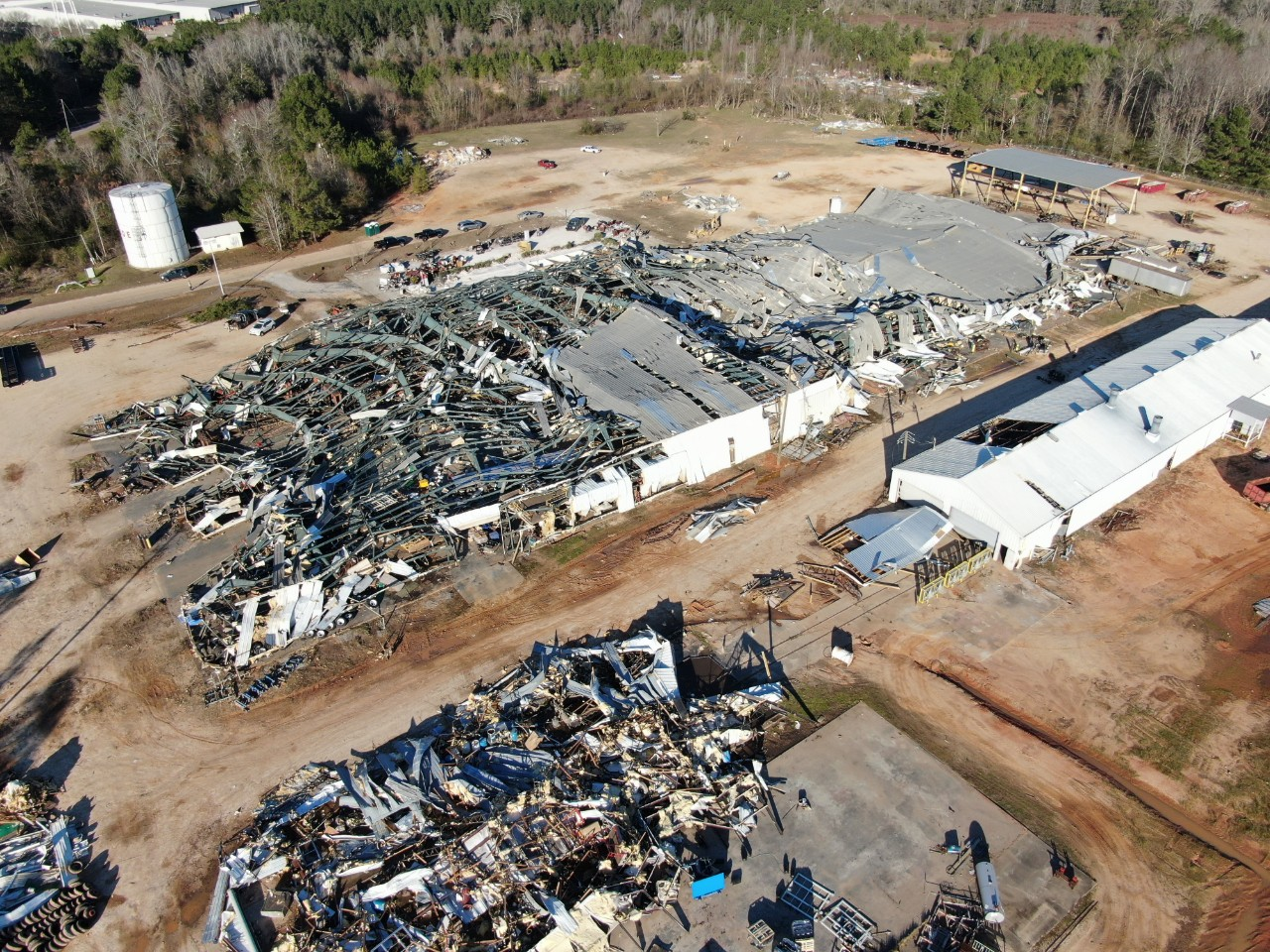
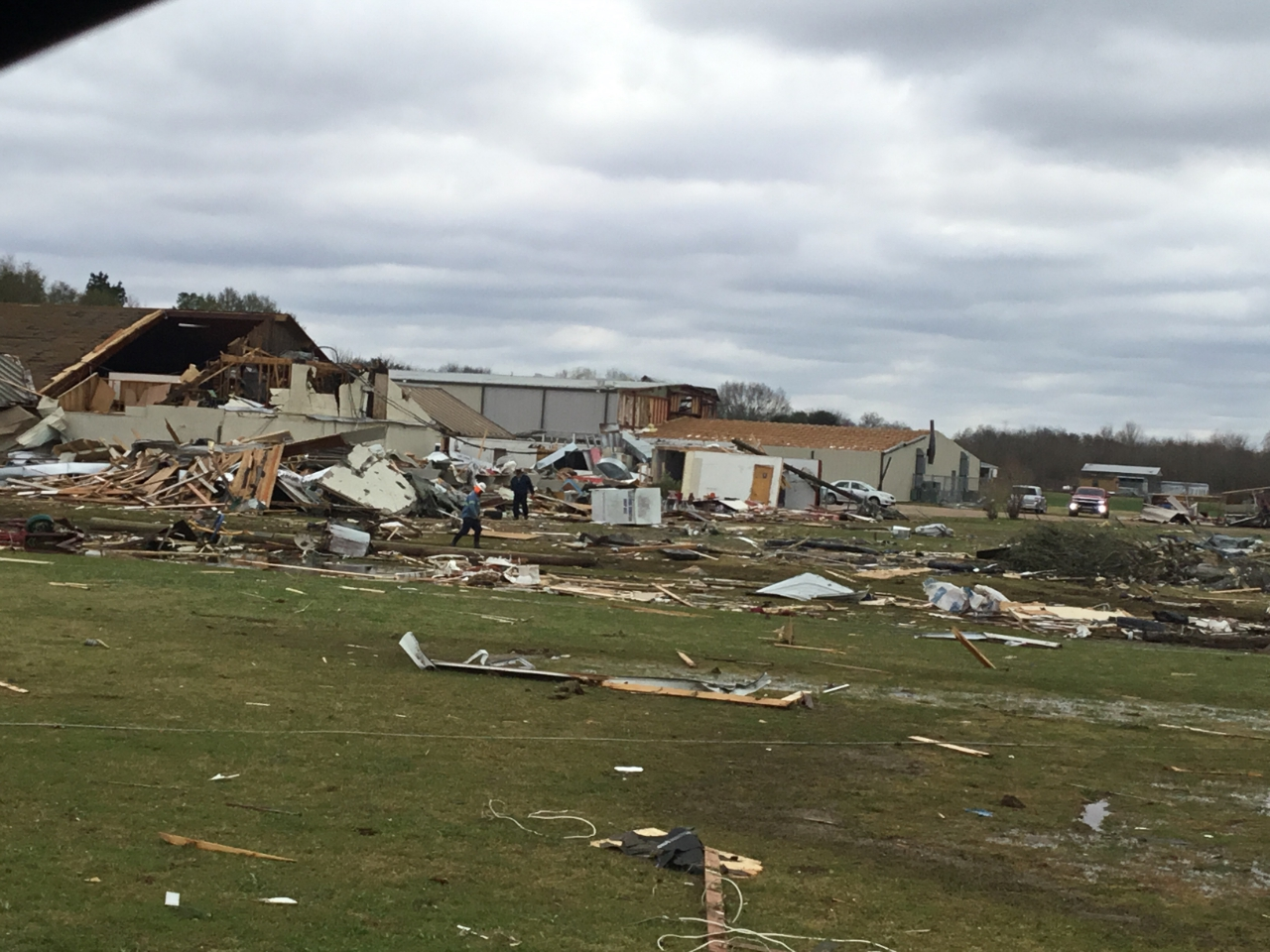
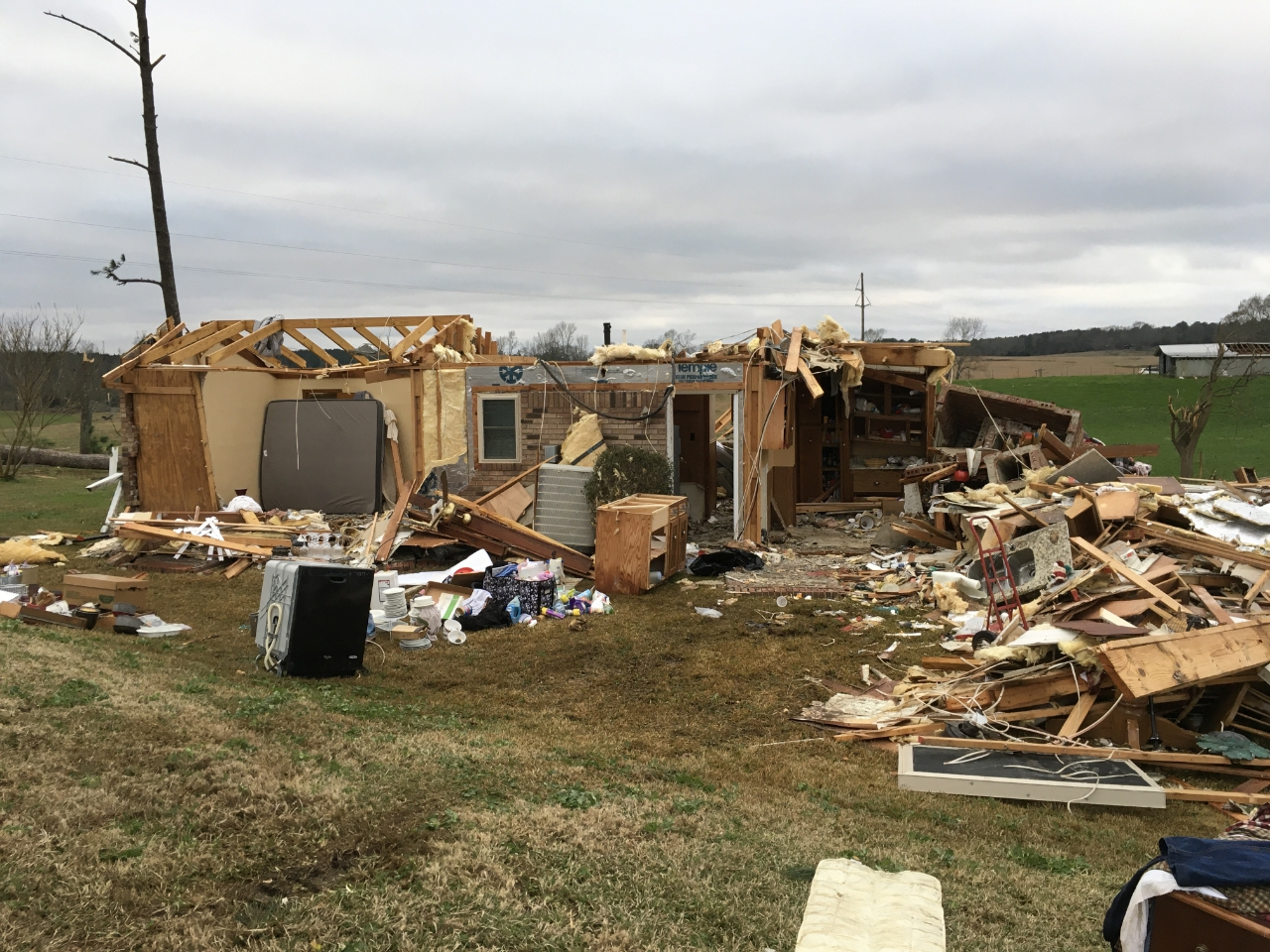
- Clockwise from top: A manufacturing plant in Laurel, Mississippi following an EF3 tornado on December 16; A home damaged by an EF3 tornado that struck Mize, Mississippi on December 16; A Christian school near Alexandria, Louisiana after an EF3 tornado on December 16.
- Timespan: November 1 – December 29
- Maximum rated tornado: EF3 tornado: Ikes–Alexandria, Louisiana on December 16; Liberty, Mississippi on December 16; Sumrall, Mississippi on December 16; Milton, Mississippi on December 16; Laurel, Mississippi on December 16
- Tornadoes: 75
- Fatalities: 3
- Injuries: 26

This page documents all tornadoes confirmed by various weather forecast offices of the National Weather Service in the United States from November to December 2019. Based on the 1991–2010 averaging period, 58 tornadoes occur across the United States throughout November while 24 more occur in December.

November was devoid of any large outbreaks and although a couple strong tornadoes were observed during a small outbreak between November 26–27 along four tornadoes in the Phoenix, Arizona metropolitan area on November 29, the month finished significantly below average with only 19 tornadoes. By contrast, December was highlighted by a large and destructive outbreak between December 16–17. Another small outbreak occurred at the end of the month, which finished significantly above average with 56 tornadoes.

== United States yearly total ==
Confirmed tornadoes by Enhanced Fujita rating
EFU	EF0	EF1	EF2	EF3	EF4	EF5	Total
179	655	540	119	33	3	0	1,529

== November ==
Confirmed tornadoes by Enhanced Fujita rating
EFU	EF0	EF1	EF2	EF3	EF4	EF5	Total
3	9	5	2	0	0	0	19

=== November 1 event ===
List of confirmed tornadoes – Friday, November 1, 2019 (Note: All dates are based on the local time zone where the tornado touched down; however, all times are in Coordinated Universal Time for consistency.)
EF#	Location	County / Parish	State	Start Coord.	Time (UTC)	Path length	Max width
EF1	Madison	Morris	NJ	40.7352°N 74.4748°W	04:23–04:28	4.87 mi (7.84 km)	150 yd (140 m)
EF1	This tornado followed an intermittent path though Madison, snapping and uprooting numerous trees, some of which brought down power lines and utility poles. Some trees crushed cars, and others landed on and damaged homes.						
EF1	Southern Chesapeake	Chesapeake (City)	VA	36.6320°N 76.3268°W	04:55–04:59	4.85 mi (7.81 km)	200 yd (180 m)
EF1	A camper was destroyed, while homes at the south edge of Chesapeake sustained roof, shingle and gutter damage. Numerous trees were uprooted or had branches snapped off.						
EF0	NW of Peletier	Carteret	NC	34.7394°N 77.1094°W	05:15–05:16	0.37 mi (0.60 km)	60 yd (55 m)
EF0	A brief tornado blew down a 60-yard portion of a strong vinyl horse fence. Branches up to 1 foot (30 cm) in diameter were snapped from hardwood and softwood trees.						

=== November 5 event ===
List of confirmed tornadoes – Tuesday, November 5, 2019
EF#	Location	County / Parish	State	Start Coord.	Time (UTC)	Path length	Max width
EF0	ENE of Waveland	Martin	FL	27.214°N 80.1729°W	21:20–21:23	0.26 mi (0.42 km)	10 yd (9.1 m)
EF0	A waterspout moved onshore without causing damage.						

=== November 7 event ===
List of confirmed tornadoes – Thursday, November 7, 2019
EF#	Location	County / Parish	State	Start Coord.	Time (UTC)	Path length	Max width
EF0	Mobile	Mobile	AL	30.7248°N 88.0548°W	19:35–19:37	0.38 mi (0.61 km)	25 yd (23 m)
EF0	A very weak tornado struck near the Mobile State docks and was recorded on video. A tree was snapped and a utility pole was blown down. Insulation was blown out from an industrial building, but the roof did not sustain much damage.						

=== November 26 event ===
List of confirmed tornadoes – Tuesday, November 26, 2019
EF#	Location	County / Parish	State	Start Coord.	Time (UTC)	Path length	Max width
EF2	N of Baskin	Franklin	LA	32.2351°N 91.7783°W	00:03–00:15	7.02 mi (11.30 km)	700 yd (640 m)
EF2	1 death - Two mobile homes were rolled over and destroyed, injuring two people in one of them. One of the injured people later died. Another mobile home was pushed off its cinder blocks. A church slid 4 feet (1.2 m) off its foundation, and a house lost most of the shingles from the back portion of its roof. A shed lost metal from its roof, two wooden power poles were snapped, and numerous trees were uprooted.						
EF1	SE of Haynesville	Claiborne	LA	32.9017°N 93.0423°W	00:20–00:21	0.62 mi (1.00 km)	115 yd (105 m)
EF1	A mobile home suffered minor roof damage, and the top of a tree fell on a travel trailer. Trees were downed in a convergent pattern, with about 30 trees in total knocked down along the path.						
EFU	E of Delhi	Madison	LA	32.4565°N 91.3847°W	00:46–00:48	1 mi (1.6 km)	25 yd (23 m)
EFU	The tornado remained over flat farmland. No damage occurred, though airborne debris was detected by Doppler weather radar.						
EF2	Star	Rankin	MS	32.0586°N 90.1282°W	05:57–06:13	11.89 mi (19.14 km)	500 yd (460 m)
EF2	Several homes suffered roof damage, with an upper floor wall collapsing at one home. At another home, the garage door failed, resulting in broken windows and the failure of a poorly secured brick facade. Several outbuildings were completely destroyed, including one that was secured with anchor bolts. Numerous hardwood and softwood trees were uprooted and snapped.						

=== November 27 event ===
List of confirmed tornadoes – Wednesday, November 27, 2019
EF#	Location	County / Parish	State	Start Coord.	Time (UTC)	Path length	Max width
EF1	NNW of Puckett to SSE of Polkville	Rankin, Smith	MS	32.1338°N 89.8041°W	06:26–06:36	7.26 mi (11.68 km)	75 yd (69 m)
EF1	The tornado uprooted several large hardwood and softwood trees and snapped large tree limbs. Minor tree damage occurred in Smith County.						
EF0	ENE of Brundidge	Pike	AL	31.7283°N 85.7842°W	15:05–15:06	0.48 mi (0.77 km)	65 yd (59 m)
EF0	An old mobile home lost its tin roof. A newer mobile home was shifted slightly off its supports and suffered skirting damage and a broken window. Seven trees were uprooted in a convergent pattern and other trees suffered minor limb damage.						
EF0	NW of Clio	Barbour	AL	31.724°N 85.6294°W	15:19–15:21	1.15 mi (1.85 km)	40 yd (37 m)
EF0	Minor tree damage occurred.						
EF0	ENE of Clio	Barbour	AL	31.7199°N 85.5568°W	15:26–15:30	2.13 mi (3.43 km)	55 yd (50 m)
EF0	Only minor tree damage was observed.						

=== November 29 event ===
List of confirmed tornadoes – Friday, November 29, 2019
EF#	Location	County / parish	State	Start coord.	Time (UTC)	Path length	Max width	Summary
EF0	Glendale to WNW of Scottsdale	Maricopa	AZ	33.56°N 112.12°W	10:49–10:59	10.09 mi (16.24 km)	100 yd (91 m)	Several trees were downed. One carport was destroyed while a second was blown onto cars.
EF1	Eastern Glendale to Northern Scottsdale	Maricopa	AZ	33.56°N 112.06°W	10:54–11:06	8.85 mi (14.24 km)	200 yd (180 m)	Large trees were downed, some of which fell on carports and vehicles. Homes sustained roof damage, and a few had their roofs blown off.
EF0	Higley	Maricopa	AZ	33.29°N 111.75°W	11:41–11:46	4.5 mi (7.2 km)	100 yd (91 m)	Small trees were damaged in two parking lots.
EF0	Queen Creek	Maricopa	AZ	33.23°N 111.63°W	11:51–11:57	3.56 mi (5.73 km)	100 yd (91 m)	Power poles and trees were knocked down, and roofs were damaged in town.

=== November 30 event ===
List of confirmed tornadoes – Saturday, November 30, 2019
EF#	Location	County / Parish	State	Start Coord.	Time (UTC)	Path length	Max width
EFU	NE of Guthrie Center	Guthrie	IA	41.7142°N 94.4399°W	22:04–22:05	0.53 mi (0.85 km)	20 yd (18 m)
EFU	A brief spin-up tornado was reported by law enforcement and recorded on video. No damage occurred.						
EFU	NNE of Guthrie Center	Guthrie	IA	41.7456°N 94.4256°W	22:13–22:15	1.17 mi (1.88 km)	25 yd (23 m)
EFU	A tornado tracked over agricultural fields and caused no damage.						

== December ==
Confirmed tornadoes by Enhanced Fujita rating
EFU	EF0	EF1	EF2	EF3	EF4	EF5	Total
0	22	20	9	5	0	0	56

=== December 14 event ===
List of confirmed tornadoes – Saturday, December 14, 2019
EF#	Location	County / Parish	State	Start Coord.	Time (UTC)	Path length	Max width
EF0	NW of Micanopy	Alachua	FL	29.5329°N 82.3071°W	08:53–08:55	0.2 mi (0.32 km)	45 yd (41 m)
EF0	A boat shelter was severely compromised, fences and docks were broken, and watercraft were damaged. Many trees were downed.						
EF0	NE of Elkton	St. Johns	FL	29.7839°N 81.4265°W	10:05–10:07	0.25 mi (0.40 km)	325 yd (297 m)
EF0	Road signs were bent or twisted. Metal panels were torn from a building's roof and toss over a fence. A door was torn from a building.						
EF1	SW of Bunnell to S of Flagler Beach	Flagler	FL	29.3991°N 81.4269°W	10:14–10:40	19.4 mi (31.2 km)	880 yd (800 m)
EF1	A long-lived tornado tracked across Flagler county. The most significant damage was in Korona, where numerous trees, power lines and structures were damaged. One masonry building lost its roof. The tornado moved offshore south of Flagler Beach.						

=== December 16 event ===
List of confirmed tornadoes – Monday, December 16, 2019
EF#	Location	County / parish	State	Start coord.	Time (UTC)	Path length	Max width	Summary
EF1	SW of Bellevue to W of Homer	Bossier, Webster, Claiborne	LA	32.6336°N 93.602°W	16:10–16:50	26.24 mi (42.23 km)	250 yd (230 m)	Several hundred trees were snapped or uprooted by this long-lived, high-end EF1 tornado. One home lost most of its roof, toppling a brick wall. A second home also had most of its roof ripped off. A single-wide mobile home was lifted and carried about 50 yd (46 m), with the undercarriage of the structure wrapped around a tree and the remains destroyed.
EF2	N of Elizabeth	Rapides	LA	30.9273°N 92.7934°W	16:29–16:36	3.56 mi (5.73 km)	147 yd (134 m)	The roof was ripped off a well-built farm building, and the roofs of several homes and barns were damaged. Trees were snapped and uprooted.
EF1	ESE of Newellton, LA to N of Port Gibson, MS	Tensas (LA), Claiborne (MS), Warren (MS)	MS	32.0226°N 91.0938°W	17:08–17:31	11.7 mi (18.8 km)	600 yd (550 m)	Numerous trees were snapped and uprooted. A church's steeple was damaged, and minor roof damage occurred to mobile homes in a hunting camp.
EF3	DeRidder to Alexandria to Pineville	Beauregard, Vernon, Rapides	LA	30.8471°N 93.2657°W	17:10–19:00	62.61 mi (100.76 km)	550 yd (500 m)	1 death – See section on this tornado
EF1	SSE of Vicksburg to Edwards to NNW of Bolton	Warren, Hinds	MS	32.2043°N 90.7831°W	17:48–18:24	22.32 mi (35.92 km)	616 yd (563 m)	Utility poles were snapped and trees were damaged. A substation and numerous homes suffered damage, some significantly due to fallen trees.
EF3	NW of Liberty to W of Bogue Chitto	Amite, Lincoln	MS	31.194°N 90.8942°W	20:30–21:20	29.28 mi (47.12 km)	880 yd (800 m)	A large, low-end EF3 tornado impacted numerous homes, ripping the roofs off, destroying carports, and collapsing some exterior walls. A large, well-anchored manufactured home was obliterated. Its walls, floor, and roof were scattered far downstream, and multiple half-ton trucks and livestock trailers filled with thousands of pounds of tools were moved or flipped. Along the entirety of the path, numerous trees were snapped or uprooted. Three people were injured.
EF2	N of Knoxville	Franklin	MS	31.4046°N 91.1485°W	20:34–20:43	4.23 mi (6.81 km)	720 yd (660 m)	Numerous trees were snapped and uprooted. A home suffered roof damage, and a nearby outbuilding was heavily damaged. One person was indirectly injured.
EF1	SE of New Albany to NNE of Alpine	Union	MS	34.4639°N 88.9277°W	21:41–21:53	9.26 mi (14.90 km)	300 yd (270 m)	Trees were snapped and uprooted. Several structures were damaged, some by fallen trees. One person was injured.
EF0	S of Calhoun City	Calhoun	MS	33.815°N 89.3471°W	21:45–21:48	2.61 mi (4.20 km)	60 yd (55 m)	Trees were knocked down.
EF1	NNE of Wilmer	Tangipahoa, Washington	LA	30.8685°N 90.3253°W	21:46–21:49	1.35 mi (2.17 km)	50 yd (46 m)	Numerous trees were snapped, and a small section of tin roofing was ripped from a home.
EF2	Guntown	Lee	MS	34.4439°N 88.7189°W	21:53–22:04	9.42 mi (15.16 km)	250 yd (230 m)	Numerous homes in Guntown sustained heavy damage to their roofs and windows, some of which had their garage doors blown out, by this low-end EF2 tornado. Two homes in particular were nearly completely deroofed. A metal-constructed church was also destroyed. A silo, a storage shed, and trees were damaged as well.
EF0	ESE of Guntown	Lee	MS	34.4141°N 88.6267°W	21:55–21:59	2.23 mi (3.59 km)	80 yd (73 m)	Trees were damaged.
EF0	E of Bogue Chitto	Lincoln	MS	31.4372°N 90.3832°W	22:04–22:05	0.43 mi (0.69 km)	50 yd (46 m)	The wall and steeple of a church were damaged. A large tree was downed on a home, with additional tree limbs snapped in the area.
EF0	E of Hobo Station to W of New Site	Prentiss	MS	34.5566°N 88.4382°W	22:14–22:15	0.33 mi (0.53 km)	75 yd (69 m)	The roof of a barn was ripped off, and a carport and sheds were damaged.
EF1	Tishomingo to W of Mingo	Tishomingo	MS	34.6240°N 88.2287°W	22:27–22:31	3.51 mi (5.65 km)	150 yd (140 m)	Damage was inflicted to 13 homes and 3 businesses suffered damage. Trees were damaged as well.
EF2	Columbia	Marion	MS	31.1927°N 89.9206°W	22:41–22:52	7.44 mi (11.97 km)	350 yd (320 m)	A strong, multiple-vortex tornado partially ripped the roof off a collision center, damaged its exterior walls, and shattered its windows. A car was tossed over the storefront, and other nearby vehicles were moved or flipped. A library in Columbia suffered roof damage, an RV was thrown and destroyed, and power poles were snapped. Numerous trees were snapped or uprooted as well. Three people were injured.
EF2	NE of Silver Creek	Lawrence, Jefferson Davis	MS	31.6159°N 90.0076°W	22:44–23:00	10.66 mi (17.16 km)	600 yd (550 m)	Two homes were destroyed while a third had most of its roof removed as a result of this high-end EF2 tornado. A cinder block store was destroyed, and a group of three chicken houses were damaged. A mobile home was destroyed, and one person was injured after being thrown out of the structure. A nearby truck was tossed about 30 yd (27 m). Numerous trees were snapped or uprooted, and multiple power poles were broken.
EF1	ESE of Cherokee	Colbert	AL	34.7043°N 87.8715°W	22:50–22:52	0.68 mi (1.09 km)	75 yd (69 m)	Some tree trunks were snapped.
EF2	Colbert Heights	Colbert	AL	34.64°N 87.7331°W	22:52–23:01	8.18 mi (13.16 km)	250 yd (230 m)	Numerous trees were snapped or uprooted throughout Colbert Heights. Several sheds were heavily damaged. One home had its roof entirely removed, with bricks blown off its west-facing wall and windows shattered as well. Three other homes suffered extensive roof damage, and others still sustained at least minor damage. A camping trailer was overturned.
EF0	W of Lawrenceburg	Lawrence	TN	35.269°N 87.519°W	22:55–22:59	3.76 mi (6.05 km)	25 yd (23 m)	The front porch and a portion of the roof was ripped off one house, and its toilet was uplifted about 1 ft (0.30 m) above the flooring. A second house had a large number of its shingles removed. A large farm outbuilding was collapsed and another outbuilding had its roof damaged. Sporadic tree damage was observed.
EF1	NE of Columbia	Marion	MS	31.2824°N 89.7682°W	22:56–23:07	6.18 mi (9.95 km)	440 yd (400 m)	Trees were snapped and uprooted. A couple of sheds were collapsed and some shingles from ripped from a home as well.
EF2	S of Town Creek	Lawrence, Limestone	AL	34.6445°N 87.4126°W	23:08–23:31	18.46 mi (29.71 km)	370 yd (340 m)	2 deaths – A strong tornado significantly damaged several mobile homes. One double-wide mobile home was rolled off its plot and destroyed, resulting in two fatalities. Three injuries occurred among the damaged structures. Near the end of the tornado's path, a small mobile home was shifted slightly off its plot while a small and well-built block outbuilding was largely demolished. Trees were damaged along the entirety of the track.
EF3	Southern Sumrall	Lamar, Covington	MS	31.3902°N 89.5764°W	23:17–23:25	5.83 mi (9.38 km)	560 yd (510 m)	An intense multiple-vortex tornado impacted the south edge of Sumrall, where a well-built brick group home sustained significant roof and exterior wall loss. Six vehicles were tossed 40–60 yd (37–55 m) from the parking lot into a pile, and large trees were ripped out of the ground. An insulation company sustained damage to its metal storage building, where some walls were blown out. A sports complex sustained damage to its fence and bleachers. Numerous trees were snapped or uprooted, and a few homes were damaged as well. Seven people were injured.
EF3	NNW of Mount Olive to W of Mize to SW of Sylvarena	Simpson, Smith	MS	31.7925°N 89.6781°W	23:19–23:51	18.63 mi (29.98 km)	1,320 yd (1,210 m)	A tornado began near the small community of Saratoga and moved to the northeast, damaging a church in addition to a few other buildings, sheds, and homes. Three different groups of chicken houses were heavily damaged or destroyed as the tornado continued northeastward. Southwest of Mize, a well-built house had its roof ripped off and a majority of its exterior walls collapsed. Two trucks were thrown 200 yd (180 m) into a pasture, and a few ATVs were thrown considerable distances as well. Multiple structures and chicken houses were damaged to the north of town, and another well-built house lost its roof and one of its outer walls. A large shed was destroyed and a tractor and boat were tossed 50 yd (46 m). Along the entirety of the path, trees and power lines were downed.
EF1	Joe Wheeler State Park	Lauderdale	AL	34.8017°N 87.3322°W	23:20–23:24	2.9 mi (4.7 km)	500 yd (460 m)	Thousands of trees were either snapped or uprooted by a multiple-vortex tornado.
EF1	E of Athens	Limestone	AL	34.6997°N 87.1010°W	23:30–23:43	9.47 mi (15.24 km)	50 yd (46 m)	Tree trunks were snapped, and a home had most of its roof ripped off.
EF0	E of Cornersville	Marshall	TN	35.361°N 86.823°W	23:41–23:45	3.45 mi (5.55 km)	50 yd (46 m)	An outbuilding was collapsed, numerous shingles were ripped from a house, the metal roofing and siding was removed from a metal carport, and trees were sporadically uprooted.
EF0	NE of Ardmore	Lincoln	TN	35.0106°N 86.8261°W	23:50–23:52	3.2 mi (5.1 km)	50 yd (46 m)	Several trees were uprooted, and a house sustained minor damage.
EF1	Monrovia	Madison	AL	34.7904°N 86.7366°W	23:54–00:00	1.25 mi (2.01 km)	25 yd (23 m)	One home had two thirds of its roof ripped off, while homes in town sustained lesser damage, at least partially the result of flying debris such as an awning, along with fence segments and posts. A small outdoor metal shed was damaged, and numerous trees were snapped or uprooted.
EF3	Laurel, MS to WNW of Lisman, AL	Jones (MS), Wayne (MS), Clarke (MS), Choctaw (AL)	MS, AL	31.672°N 89.1726°W	23:59–01:29	61.81 mi (99.47 km)	850 yd (780 m)	See section on this tornado – Two people were injured.
EF0	SW of Meridianville	Madison	AL	34.8593°N 86.6252°W	00:05–00:12	3.16 mi (5.09 km)	37 yd (34 m)	Numerous trees were downed, and a couple of homes suffered minor roof damage.
EF2	W of Demopolis	Marengo	AL	32.4206°N 87.9787°W	02:07–02:16	5.95 mi (9.58 km)	350 yd (320 m)	Several homes suffered roof and structural damage, including one that had its roof completely removed and sustained partial wall collapse. Two mobile homes were completely demolished nearby, resulting in three injuries. Extensive tree damage was observed.
EF0	NW of Morgan Springs	Hale, Perry	AL	32.7695°N 87.4927°W	03:03–03:12	5.35 mi (8.61 km)	300 yd (270 m)	At least 100 trees were snapped or uprooted.
EF0	NE of Gary Springs	Bibb	AL	32.9800°N 87.0507°W	03:49–03:55	3.12 mi (5.02 km)	200 yd (180 m)	A few trees and limbs were downed.
EF1	N of Brierfield	Bibb	AL	33.0416°N 86.9401°W	04:00–04:04	2.6 mi (4.2 km)	300 yd (270 m)	Dozens of trees were snapped or uprooted, and a barn was damaged as well.
EF0	E of Montevallo	Shelby	AL	33.0851°N 86.8429°W	04:07–04:12	2.29 mi (3.69 km)	200 yd (180 m)	An outbuilding was destroyed, two mobile homes suffered minor damage, and dozens of trees were snapped or uprooted. A house sustained minor roof damage, and a deputy sheriff was blown off the road in his vehicle.

=== December 17 event ===
List of confirmed tornadoes – Tuesday, December 17, 2019
EF#	Location	County / parish	State	Start coord.	Time (UTC)	Path length	Max width	Summary
EF0	N of Rock Hill	Early	GA	31.355°N 85.0228°W	12:30–12:33	0.4 mi (0.64 km)	50 yd (46 m)	A few trees were snapped and blown in opposing directions.
EF0	Madrid	Houston	AL	31.03°N 85.39°W	12:52–12:53	0.14 mi (0.23 km)	25 yd (23 m)	One home lost a garage and outbuilding. A few dozen softwood trees were uprooted or snapped.
EF1	E of Jeterville	Miller	GA	31.2046°N 84.7031°W	14:27–14:36	6.56 mi (10.56 km)	200 yd (180 m)	Barns, trees, and farm equipment was damaged.
EF0	WSW of Newton	Baker	GA	31.3074°N 84.3932°W	15:00–15:02	0.2 mi (0.32 km)	75 yd (69 m)	Several trees were snapped, a mobile home was slid off its support about 3 ft (0.91 m) and had its roof damaged, and an irrigation pivot was damaged.
EF2	W of Ocilla to E of Ashton	Irwin, Ben Hill	GA	31.58°N 83.42°W	16:39–17:09	20.31 mi (32.69 km)	400 yd (370 m)	Hundreds of trees were snapped by this high-end EF2 tornado, and several homes were severely damaged and sustained roof loss. The most severe damage occurred at Grace Christian Academy in Mystic, where multiple brick buildings had roofs torn off and sustained collapse of exterior walls. Barns and outbuildings were heavily damaged or destroyed, irrigation machinery was damaged, and a couple RVs were rolled over and heavily damaged.

=== December 25 event ===
List of confirmed tornadoes – Wednesday, December 25, 2019
EF#	Location	County / Parish	State	Start Coord.	Time (UTC)	Path length	Max width
EF0	S of Ventura	Ventura	CA	34.2356°N 119.2588°W	05:00–05:15	0.84 mi (1.35 km)	7 yd (6.4 m)
EF0	A short-lived tornado moved across Ventura Harbor. Damage was limited to trees, clay roof tiles, a small kiosk, and canopies from businesses. One canopy was blown into a finishing boat in the harbor.						

=== December 27 event ===
List of confirmed tornadoes – Friday, December 27, 2019
EF#	Location	County / Parish	State	Start Coord.	Time (UTC)	Path length	Max width
EF1	NW of Clovis	Curry	NM	34.5798°N 103.3425°W	23:54–00:03	4.79 mi (7.71 km)	100 yd (91 m)
EF1	Three wooden high transmission power poles were snapped about 2 ft (0.61 m) above ground level. At least three center pivot irrigation systems were significantly damaged or destroyed. This is the latest tornado on record in New Mexico.						

=== December 28 event ===
List of confirmed tornadoes – Saturday, December 28, 2019
EF#	Location	County / Parish	State	Start Coord.	Time (UTC)	Path length	Max width
EF0	SE of Broken Arrow	Tulsa, Wagoner	OK	36.0121°N 95.7647°W	21:30–21:32	1.2 mi (1.9 km)	160 yd (150 m)
EF0	Part of the roof of one house was lifted and another house suffered roof damage. Large tree limbs were snapped and utility poles were left leaning. The tornado crossed the Broken Arrow campus of Northeastern State University before dissipating.						
EF0	S of Fair Play	Polk	MO	37.5943°N 93.5645°W	01:03–01:06	1.36 mi (2.19 km)	75 yd (69 m)
EF0	A brief tornado damaged a few farm buildings, uprooted and snapped several trees, and broke tree branches.						

=== December 29 event ===
List of confirmed tornadoes – Sunday, December 29, 2019
EF#	Location	County / Parish	State	Start Coord.	Time (UTC)	Path length	Max width
EF0	W of Bolton	Hinds	MS	32.3604°N 90.4975°W	20:49–20:51	0.89 mi (1.43 km)	150 yd (140 m)
EF0	A brief tornado caused minor tree damage.						
EF1	SE of Goodman to SE of Sallis	Madison, Leake, Attala	MS	32.8795°N 89.8075°W	21:35–21:42	7.34 mi (11.81 km)	400 yd (370 m)
EF1	A small outbuilding and pumphouse were destroyed. Power lines were taken down. Many hardwood and softwood trees were uprooted and snapped.						
EF1	NE of Kosciusko to NE of Ethel	Attala	MS	33.0978°N 89.5429°W	21:53–22:01	6.6 mi (10.6 km)	500 yd (460 m)
EF1	Hundreds of trees were damaged or destroyed and the roof of a barn was damaged.						
EF1	NNE of Ethel to NNE of McCool	Attala	MS	33.1628°N 89.4323°W	22:03–22:11	7.7 mi (12.4 km)	900 yd (820 m)
EF1	Outbuildings were damaged and a fuel tank was thrown across a pasture. Power lines and hundreds of trees were destroyed.						
EF1	E of Weir	Choctaw	MS	33.2598°N 89.2778°W	22:13–22:17	3.82 mi (6.15 km)	200 yd (180 m)
EF1	Trees were toppled and a power pole was knocked down. Minor tree damage occurred along the later part of the path.						
EF0	SE of Maben	Oktibbeha	MS	33.472°N 89.0315°W	22:32–22:35	2.61 mi (4.20 km)	200 yd (180 m)
EF0	The tornado caused minor damage to mobile homes, skirting, and shingles and scattered tree damage.						
EF1	SW of Union	Newton	MS	32.5268°N 89.1628°W	23:13–23:18	3.23 mi (5.20 km)	125 yd (114 m)
EF1	A metal storage building lost its roof and some of its walls collapsed. A carport was destroyed. An outbuilding lost a small portion of its roof. A home suffered minor roof damage. Numerous trees were snapped and uprooted.						
EF0	SW of Athens	Limestone	AL	34.7541°N 87.0777°W	00:50–00:57	5.07 mi (8.16 km)	50 yd (46 m)
EF0	Mobile homes suffered roof and window damage. One mobile home was moved about 6 feet (2 m) and detached from an awning, but otherwise remained intact. A small outbuilding suffered significant damage and metal building systems suffered roof and siding damage. A portion of the porch roof of a small house was uplifted. Metals signs were damaged. Trees were uprooted and snapped and tree limbs were broken. One tree fell on a car and a tree limb fell on a house.						

== See also ==
- Tornadoes of 2019
- List of United States tornadoes from September to October 2019
- List of United States tornadoes in January 2020
