= Tornado outbreak of December 16–17, 2019 =

Tornado outbreak in the Southeastern United States in December 2019

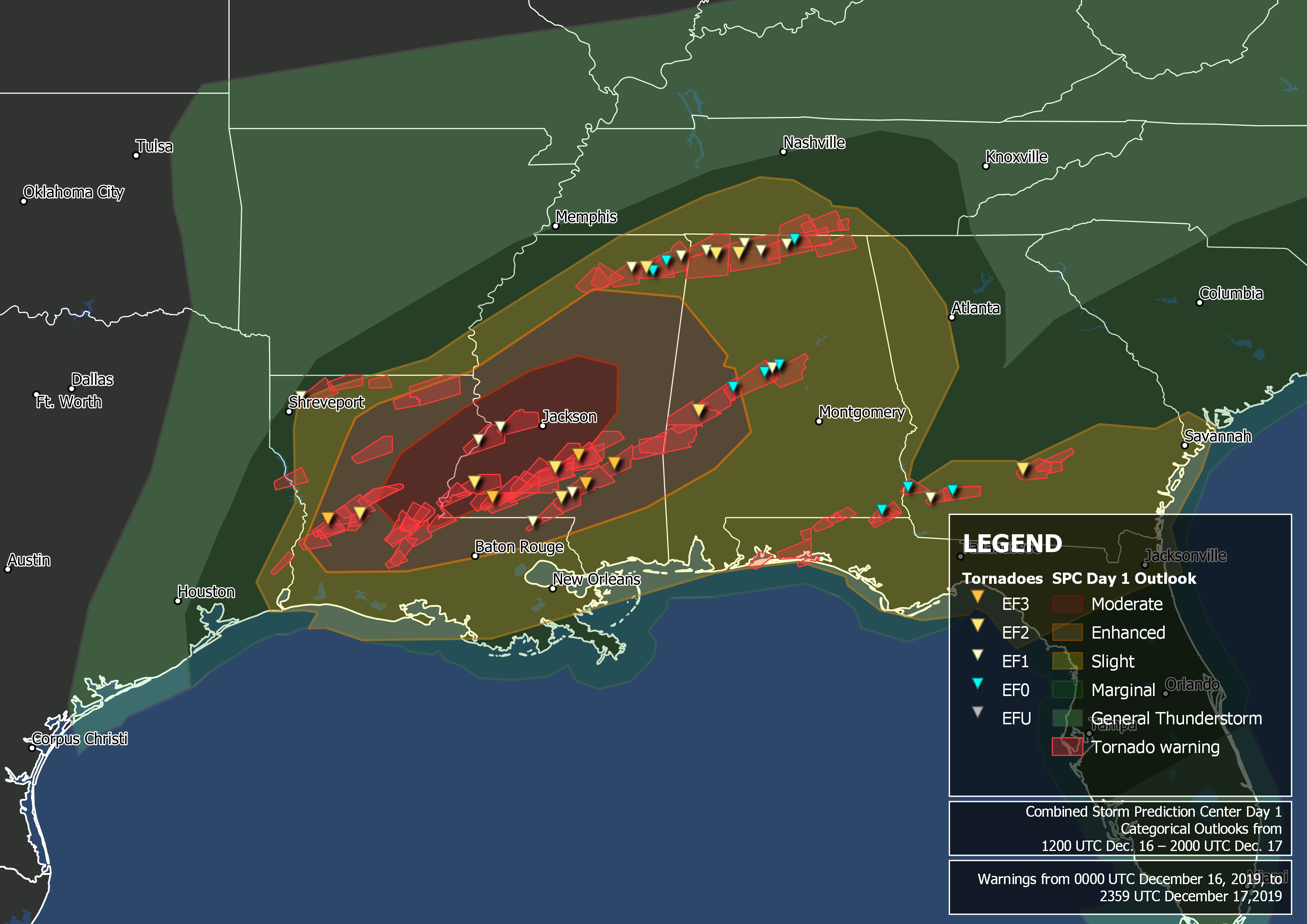
- Map of tornado warnings and confirmed tornadoes from the outbreak

Meteorological history
- Formed: December 16, 2019
- Dissipated: December 17, 2019

Tornado outbreak
- Tornadoes: 41
- Max. rating: EF3 tornado
- Duration: 24 hours, 59 minutes
- Highest winds: Tornadic - 160 mph (260 km/h) near Alexandria, Louisiana; Straight-line - 80 mph (130 km/h) in Walthall County, Mississippi.
- Largest hail: 1.75 in (44 mm)

Overall effects
- Fatalities: 3 (+13 non-tornadic) fatalities
- Injuries: ≥14 injuries
- Damage: $32.5 million
- Areas affected: Louisiana, Mississippi, Alabama, Tennessee, Florida, Georgia
- Part of the tornado outbreaks of 2019

A significant severe weather and tornado outbreak affected the Southern United States between December 16–17, 2019. Discrete supercells developed in the early morning on December 16 and moved northeast, spawning multiple strong, long-tracked tornadoes in cities such as Alexandria and in Laurel before congealing into an eastward-moving squall line. During the outbreak, the National Weather Service issued several PDS tornado warnings as well as a rare tornado emergency for Alexandria. In addition to this, the Storm Prediction Center issued six tornado watches for the outbreak. The event happened to take place on the same date of another outbreak in a similar area 19 years earlier. It also occurred in a similar area later impacted by the December 28–29, 2024 tornado outbreak.

== Meteorological synopsis ==
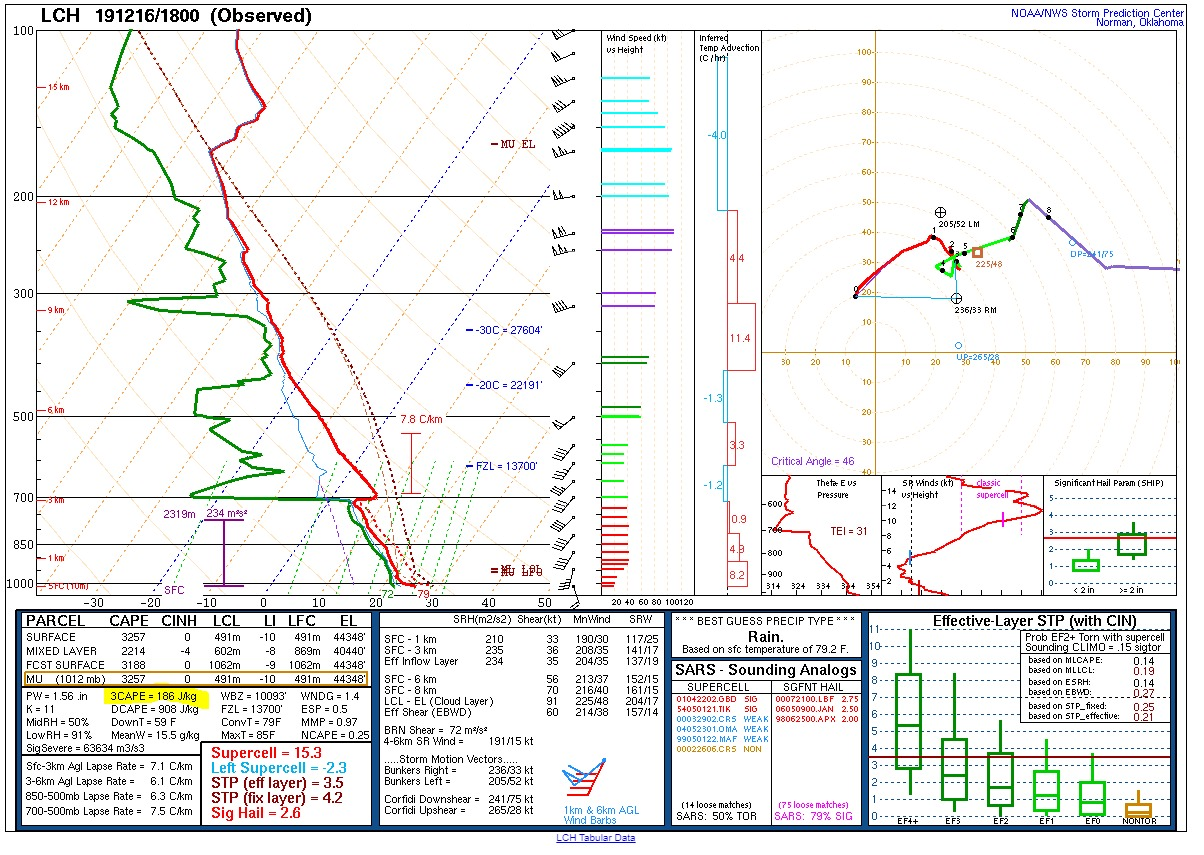
Lake Charles Sounding at 1800z on December 16, 2019

The first signs of organized severe weather came on December 12, when the Storm Prediction Center (SPC) outlined a day 5 risk area across portions of the Mid-South and lower Ohio River Valley. This 15% delineation area was shifted southwestward the following day and translated to a broad Slight risk for severe weather on December 14. In their first day 2 outlook, the SPC introduced an Enhanced risk across portions of Louisiana, Mississippi, and Alabama. By the late morning of December 16, a Moderate risk area was introduced from eastern Louisiana through central Mississippi.

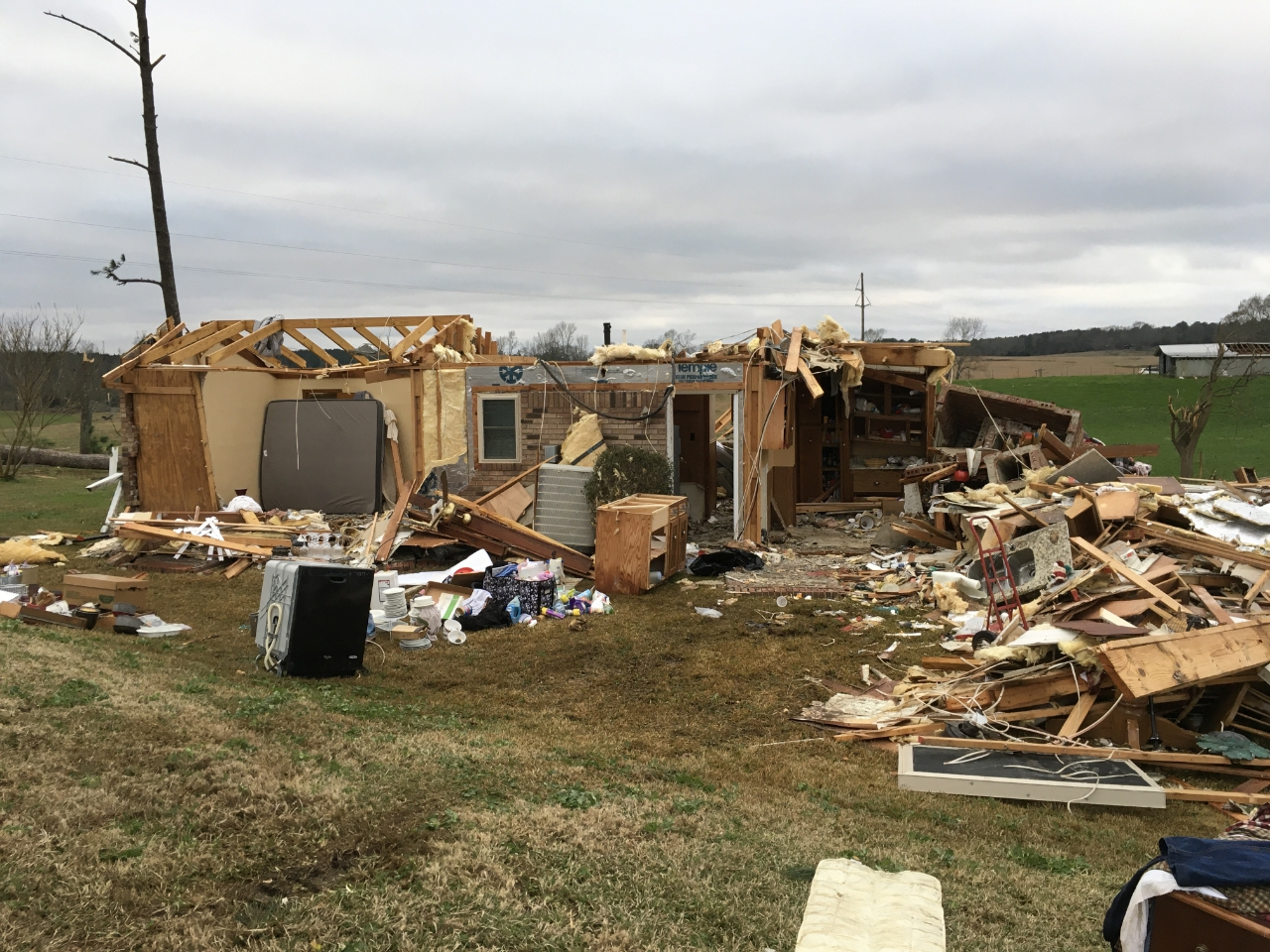
EF3 damage to a house near Mize, Mississippi.

Expectations of a tornado outbreak arose on December 16 as a well-defined, positively tilted trough existed across the central United States and very strong cyclonic flow developed southeast of this feature. At the surface, a cold front was expected to progress across the Southeast United States while an intensifying area of low pressure propagated northeast along the boundary. The environment along and ahead of this front was anticipated to be favorable for severe weather, featuring dewpoints as high as the low 70s Fahrenheit, mid-level Convective Available Potential Energy on the order of 1,000–2,000 J/kg, and a 40–60 kn (46–69 mph) contributing to large hodographs and strong cyclonic updraft potential. In addition, advection of drier air aloft was predicted to inhibit convective development until later in the day. Given the general alignment of the cold front and wind shear aloft, the SPC was uncertain early on December 16 over whether numerous discrete supercells would exist in the highest threat area. By later in the day, however, a consistent signal for sustained warm-sector supercells from available model guidance lent credibility to the potential for multiple significant tornadoes. At 16:40 UTC, the SPC issued their first tornado watch, the first of four during the day as the severe weather threat spread eastward. Discrete supercells soon developed within the warm sector across Louisiana, while a line of thunderstorms congealed along the encroaching cold front. Numerous tornadoes, some strong to intense, were observed across Louisiana and Mississippi throughout the afternoon hours. By late evening, isolated supercells were overtaken by the squall line, reducing the significant tornado threat. The following morning, the storms propagated eastward into Georgia, where a few additional tornadoes occurred before the outbreak came to an end.

== Confirmed tornadoes ==
Confirmed tornadoes by Enhanced Fujita rating
EFU	EF0	EF1	EF2	EF3	EF4	EF5	Total
0	14	13	9	5	0	0	41

=== December 16 event ===
List of confirmed tornadoes – Monday, December 16, 2019 (Note: All dates are based on the local time zone where the tornado touched down; however, all times are in Coordinated Universal Time for consistency.)
EF#	Location	County / Parish	State	Start Coord.	Time (UTC)	Path length	Max width
EF1	SW of Bellevue to W of Homer	Bossier, Webster, Claiborne	LA	32.6336°N 93.602°W	16:10–16:50	26.24 mi (42.23 km)	250 yd (230 m)
EF1	Several hundred trees were snapped or uprooted by this long-lived, high-end EF1 tornado. One home lost most of its roof, toppling a brick wall. A second home also had most of its roof ripped off. A single-wide mobile home was lifted and carried about 50 yd (46 m), with the undercarriage of the structure wrapped around a tree and the remains destroyed.						
EF2	N of Elizabeth	Rapides	LA	30.9273°N 92.7934°W	16:29–16:36	3.56 mi (5.73 km)	147 yd (134 m)
EF2	The roof was ripped off a well-built farm building, and the roofs of several homes and barns were damaged. Trees were snapped and uprooted.						
EF1	ESE of Newellton, LA to N of Port Gibson, MS	Tensas (LA), Claiborne (MS), Warren (MS)	MS	32.0226°N 91.0938°W	17:08–17:31	11.7 mi (18.8 km)	600 yd (550 m)
EF1	Numerous trees were snapped and uprooted. A church's steeple was damaged, and minor roof damage occurred to mobile homes in a hunting camp.						
EF3	DeRidder to Alexandria to Pineville	Beauregard, Vernon, Rapides	LA	30.8471°N 93.2657°W	17:10–19:00	62.61 mi (100.76 km)	550 yd (500 m)
EF3	1 death – See section on this tornado						
EF1	SSE of Vicksburg to Edwards to NNW of Bolton	Warren, Hinds	MS	32.2043°N 90.7831°W	17:48–18:24	22.32 mi (35.92 km)	616 yd (563 m)
EF1	Utility poles were snapped and trees were damaged. A substation and numerous homes suffered damage, some significantly due to fallen trees.						
EF3	NW of Liberty to W of Bogue Chitto	Amite, Lincoln	MS	31.194°N 90.8942°W	20:30–21:20	29.28 mi (47.12 km)	880 yd (800 m)
EF3	A large, low-end EF3 tornado impacted numerous homes, ripping the roofs off, destroying carports, and collapsing some exterior walls. A large, well-anchored manufactured home was obliterated. Its walls, floor, and roof were scattered far downstream, and multiple half-ton trucks and livestock trailers filled with thousands of pounds of tools were moved or flipped. Along the entirety of the path, numerous trees were snapped or uprooted. Three people were injured.						
EF2	N of Knoxville	Franklin	MS	31.4046°N 91.1485°W	20:34–20:43	4.23 mi (6.81 km)	720 yd (660 m)
EF2	Numerous trees were snapped and uprooted. A home suffered roof damage, and a nearby outbuilding was heavily damaged. One person was indirectly injured.						
EF1	SE of New Albany to NNE of Alpine	Union	MS	34.4639°N 88.9277°W	21:41–21:53	9.26 mi (14.90 km)	300 yd (270 m)
EF1	Trees were snapped and uprooted. Several structures were damaged, some by fallen trees. One person was injured.						
EF0	S of Calhoun City	Calhoun	MS	33.815°N 89.3471°W	21:45–21:48	2.61 mi (4.20 km)	60 yd (55 m)
EF0	Trees were knocked down.						
EF1	NNE of Wilmer	Tangipahoa, Washington	LA	30.8685°N 90.3253°W	21:46–21:49	1.35 mi (2.17 km)	50 yd (46 m)
EF1	Numerous trees were snapped, and a small section of tin roofing was ripped from a home.						
EF2	Guntown	Lee	MS	34.4439°N 88.7189°W	21:53–22:04	9.42 mi (15.16 km)	250 yd (230 m)
EF2	Numerous homes in Guntown sustained heavy damage to their roofs and windows, some of which had their garage doors blown out, by this low-end EF2 tornado. Two homes in particular were nearly completely deroofed. A metal-constructed church was also destroyed. A silo, a storage shed, and trees were damaged as well.						
EF0	ESE of Guntown	Lee	MS	34.4141°N 88.6267°W	21:55–21:59	2.23 mi (3.59 km)	80 yd (73 m)
EF0	Trees were damaged.						
EF0	E of Bogue Chitto	Lincoln	MS	31.4372°N 90.3832°W	22:04–22:05	0.43 mi (0.69 km)	50 yd (46 m)
EF0	The wall and steeple of a church were damaged. A large tree was downed on a home, with additional tree limbs snapped in the area.						
EF0	E of Hobo Station to W of New Site	Prentiss	MS	34.5566°N 88.4382°W	22:14–22:15	0.33 mi (0.53 km)	75 yd (69 m)
EF0	The roof of a barn was ripped off, and a carport and sheds were damaged.						
EF1	Tishomingo to W of Mingo	Tishomingo	MS	34.6240°N 88.2287°W	22:27–22:31	3.51 mi (5.65 km)	150 yd (140 m)
EF1	Damage was inflicted to 13 homes and 3 businesses suffered damage. Trees were damaged as well.						
EF2	Columbia	Marion	MS	31.1927°N 89.9206°W	22:41–22:52	7.44 mi (11.97 km)	350 yd (320 m)
EF2	A strong, multiple-vortex tornado partially ripped the roof off a collision center, damaged its exterior walls, and shattered its windows. A car was tossed over the storefront, and other nearby vehicles were moved or flipped. A library in Columbia suffered roof damage, an RV was thrown and destroyed, and power poles were snapped. Numerous trees were snapped or uprooted as well. Three people were injured.						
EF2	NE of Silver Creek	Lawrence, Jefferson Davis	MS	31.6159°N 90.0076°W	22:44–23:00	10.66 mi (17.16 km)	600 yd (550 m)
EF2	Two homes were destroyed while a third had most of its roof removed as a result of this high-end EF2 tornado. A cinder block store was destroyed, and a group of three chicken houses were damaged. A mobile home was destroyed, and one person was injured after being thrown out of the structure. A nearby truck was tossed about 30 yd (27 m). Numerous trees were snapped or uprooted, and multiple power poles were broken.						
EF1	ESE of Cherokee	Colbert	AL	34.7043°N 87.8715°W	22:50–22:52	0.68 mi (1.09 km)	75 yd (69 m)
EF1	Some tree trunks were snapped.						
EF2	Colbert Heights	Colbert	AL	34.64°N 87.7331°W	22:52–23:01	8.18 mi (13.16 km)	250 yd (230 m)
EF2	Numerous trees were snapped or uprooted throughout Colbert Heights. Several sheds were heavily damaged. One home had its roof entirely removed, with bricks blown off its west-facing wall and windows shattered as well. Three other homes suffered extensive roof damage, and others still sustained at least minor damage. A camping trailer was overturned.						
EF0	W of Lawrenceburg	Lawrence	TN	35.269°N 87.519°W	22:55–22:59	3.76 mi (6.05 km)	25 yd (23 m)
EF0	The front porch and a portion of the roof was ripped off one house, and its toilet was uplifted about 1 ft (0.30 m) above the flooring. A second house had a large number of its shingles removed. A large farm outbuilding was collapsed and another outbuilding had its roof damaged. Sporadic tree damage was observed.						
EF1	NE of Columbia	Marion	MS	31.2824°N 89.7682°W	22:56–23:07	6.18 mi (9.95 km)	440 yd (400 m)
EF1	Trees were snapped and uprooted. A couple of sheds were collapsed and some shingles from ripped from a home as well.						
EF2	S of Town Creek	Lawrence, Limestone	AL	34.6445°N 87.4126°W	23:08–23:31	18.46 mi (29.71 km)	370 yd (340 m)
EF2	2 deaths – A strong tornado significantly damaged several mobile homes. One double-wide mobile home was rolled off its plot and destroyed, resulting in two fatalities. Three injuries occurred among the damaged structures. Near the end of the tornado's path, a small mobile home was shifted slightly off its plot while a small and well-built block outbuilding was largely demolished. Trees were damaged along the entirety of the track.						
EF3	Southern Sumrall	Lamar, Covington	MS	31.3902°N 89.5764°W	23:17–23:25	5.83 mi (9.38 km)	560 yd (510 m)
EF3	An intense multiple-vortex tornado impacted the south edge of Sumrall, where a well-built brick group home sustained significant roof and exterior wall loss. Six vehicles were tossed 40–60 yd (37–55 m) from the parking lot into a pile, and large trees were ripped out of the ground. An insulation company sustained damage to its metal storage building, where some walls were blown out. A sports complex sustained damage to its fence and bleachers. Numerous trees were snapped or uprooted, and a few homes were damaged as well. Seven people were injured.						
EF3	NNW of Mount Olive to W of Mize to SW of Sylvarena	Simpson, Smith	MS	31.7925°N 89.6781°W	23:19–23:51	18.63 mi (29.98 km)	1,320 yd (1,210 m)
EF3	A tornado began near the small community of Saratoga and moved to the northeast, damaging a church in addition to a few other buildings, sheds, and homes. Three different groups of chicken houses were heavily damaged or destroyed as the tornado continued northeastward. Southwest of Mize, a well-built house had its roof ripped off and a majority of its exterior walls collapsed. Two trucks were thrown 200 yd (180 m) into a pasture, and a few ATVs were thrown considerable distances as well. Multiple structures and chicken houses were damaged to the north of town, and another well-built house lost its roof and one of its outer walls. A large shed was destroyed and a tractor and boat were tossed 50 yd (46 m). Along the entirety of the path, trees and power lines were downed.						
EF1	Joe Wheeler State Park	Lauderdale	AL	34.8017°N 87.3322°W	23:20–23:24	2.9 mi (4.7 km)	500 yd (460 m)
EF1	Thousands of trees were either snapped or uprooted by a multiple-vortex tornado.						
EF1	E of Athens	Limestone	AL	34.6997°N 87.1010°W	23:30–23:43	9.47 mi (15.24 km)	50 yd (46 m)
EF1	Tree trunks were snapped, and a home had most of its roof ripped off.						
EF0	E of Cornersville	Marshall	TN	35.361°N 86.823°W	23:41–23:45	3.45 mi (5.55 km)	50 yd (46 m)
EF0	An outbuilding was collapsed, numerous shingles were ripped from a house, the metal roofing and siding was removed from a metal carport, and trees were sporadically uprooted.						
EF0	NE of Ardmore	Lincoln	TN	35.0106°N 86.8261°W	23:50–23:52	3.2 mi (5.1 km)	50 yd (46 m)
EF0	Several trees were uprooted, and a house sustained minor damage.						
EF1	Monrovia	Madison	AL	34.7904°N 86.7366°W	23:54–00:00	1.25 mi (2.01 km)	25 yd (23 m)
EF1	One home had two thirds of its roof ripped off, while homes in town sustained lesser damage, at least partially the result of flying debris such as an awning, along with fence segments and posts. A small outdoor metal shed was damaged, and numerous trees were snapped or uprooted.						
EF3	Laurel, MS to WNW of Lisman, AL	Jones (MS), Wayne (MS), Clarke (MS), Choctaw (AL)	MS, AL	31.672°N 89.1726°W	23:59–01:29	61.81 mi (99.47 km)	850 yd (780 m)
EF3	See section on this tornado – Two people were injured.						
EF0	SW of Meridianville	Madison	AL	34.8593°N 86.6252°W	00:05–00:12	3.16 mi (5.09 km)	37 yd (34 m)
EF0	Numerous trees were downed, and a couple of homes suffered minor roof damage.						
EF2	W of Demopolis	Marengo	AL	32.4206°N 87.9787°W	02:07–02:16	5.95 mi (9.58 km)	350 yd (320 m)
EF2	Several homes suffered roof and structural damage, including one that had its roof completely removed and sustained partial wall collapse. Two mobile homes were completely demolished nearby, resulting in three injuries. Extensive tree damage was observed.						
EF0	NW of Morgan Springs	Hale, Perry	AL	32.7695°N 87.4927°W	03:03–03:12	5.35 mi (8.61 km)	300 yd (270 m)
EF0	At least 100 trees were snapped or uprooted.						
EF0	NE of Gary Springs	Bibb	AL	32.9800°N 87.0507°W	03:49–03:55	3.12 mi (5.02 km)	200 yd (180 m)
EF0	A few trees and limbs were downed.						
EF1	N of Brierfield	Bibb	AL	33.0416°N 86.9401°W	04:00–04:04	2.6 mi (4.2 km)	300 yd (270 m)
EF1	Dozens of trees were snapped or uprooted, and a barn was damaged as well.						
EF0	E of Montevallo	Shelby	AL	33.0851°N 86.8429°W	04:07–04:12	2.29 mi (3.69 km)	200 yd (180 m)
EF0	An outbuilding was destroyed, two mobile homes suffered minor damage, and dozens of trees were snapped or uprooted. A house sustained minor roof damage, and a deputy sheriff was blown off the road in his vehicle.						

=== December 17 event ===
List of confirmed tornadoes – Tuesday, December 17, 2019
EF#	Location	County / Parish	State	Start Coord.	Time (UTC)	Path length	Max width
EF0	N of Rock Hill	Early	GA	31.355°N 85.0228°W	12:30–12:33	0.4 mi (0.64 km)	50 yd (46 m)
EF0	A few trees were snapped and blown in opposing directions.						
EF0	Madrid	Houston	AL	31.03°N 85.39°W	12:52–12:53	0.14 mi (0.23 km)	25 yd (23 m)
EF0	One home lost a garage and outbuilding. A few dozen softwood trees were uprooted or snapped.						
EF1	E of Jeterville	Miller	GA	31.2046°N 84.7031°W	14:27–14:36	6.56 mi (10.56 km)	200 yd (180 m)
EF1	Barns, trees, and farm equipment was damaged.						
EF0	WSW of Newton	Baker	GA	31.3074°N 84.3932°W	15:00–15:02	0.2 mi (0.32 km)	75 yd (69 m)
EF0	Several trees were snapped, a mobile home was slid off its support about 3 ft (0.91 m) and had its roof damaged, and an irrigation pivot was damaged.						
EF2	W of Ocilla to E of Ashton	Irwin, Ben Hill	GA	31.58°N 83.42°W	16:39–17:09	20.31 mi (32.69 km)	400 yd (370 m)
EF2	Hundreds of trees were snapped by this high-end EF2 tornado, and several homes were severely damaged and sustained roof loss. The most severe damage occurred at Grace Christian Academy in Mystic, where multiple brick buildings had roofs torn off and sustained collapse of exterior walls. Barns and outbuildings were heavily damaged or destroyed, irrigation machinery was damaged, and a couple RVs were rolled over and heavily damaged.						

=== DeRidder–Rosepine–Alexandria–Pineville, Louisiana ===
DeRidder–Rosepine–Alexandria–Pineville, Louisiana
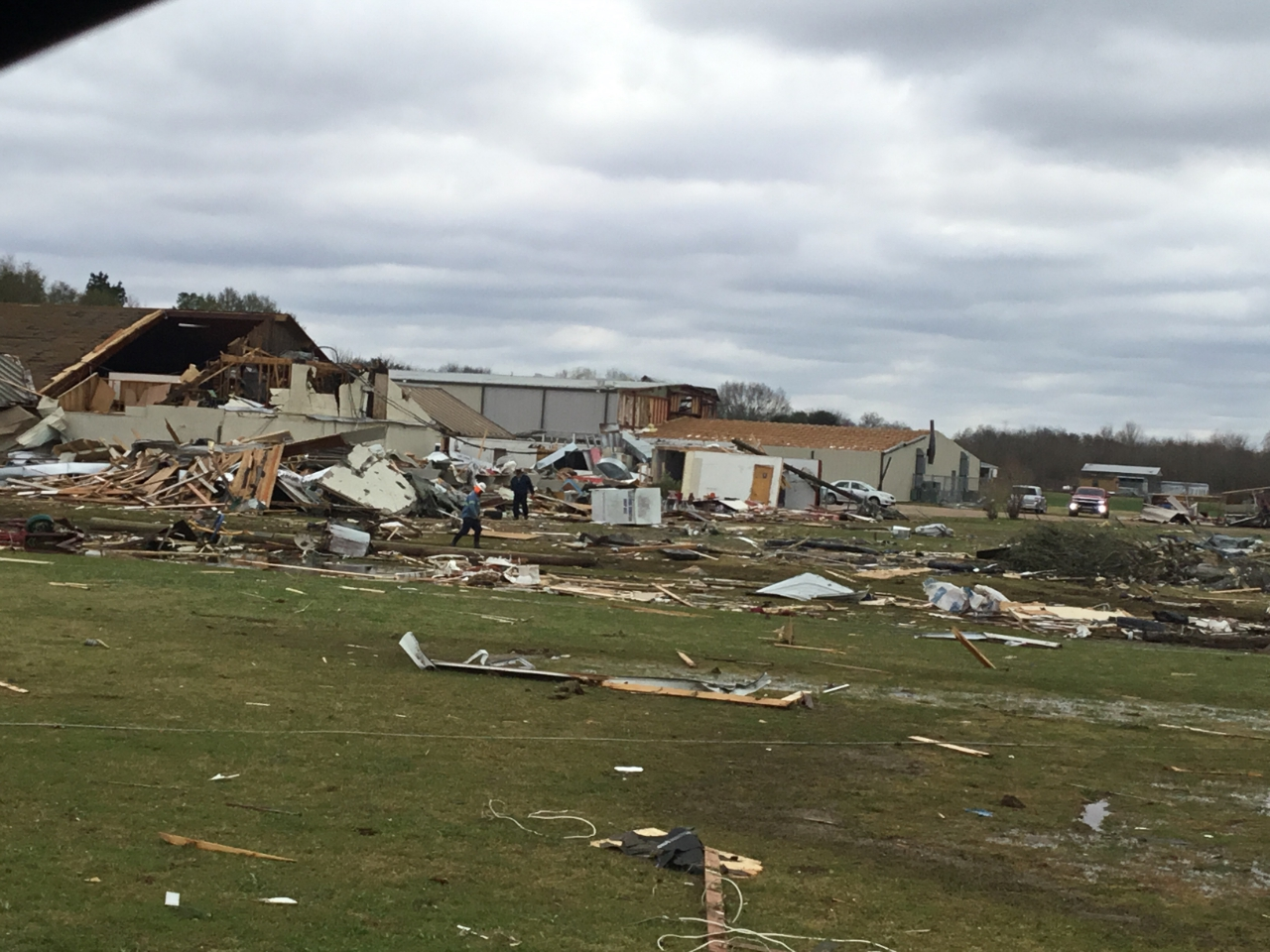
- EF3 damage to the Hope Baptist School in Alexandria, Louisiana.

Meteorological history
- Duration: 1 hour, 50 minutes

EF3 tornado
- on the Enhanced Fujita scale
- Highest winds: 160 mph (260 km/h)

Overall effects
- Fatalities: 1
- Damage: $25 million (2019 USD)

During the afternoon of December 16, a strong, long-tracked and damaging tornado touched down in DeRidder, Louisiana. The tornado was initially weak, causing minor EF0 to EF1 tree and roof damage in DeRidder. The tornado exited DeRidder, widening and strengthening as it continued northeastward into Vernon Parish and reaching EF3 strength as it passed to the southeast of Rosepine. Severe damage occurred along Mac Sterling Road, John Brewer Road, and Borel Road, where a couple of manufactured homes were obliterated with the debris scattered long distances through nearby fields. Outbuildings were destroyed, many large trees were snapped or uprooted, and some frame homes sustained partial to total roof loss. A few of these frame homes sustained collapse of exterior walls as well. A 59-year-old woman was killed in her home by the tornado in this area. The tornado weakened back to EF1 strength as it continued to the northeast, crossing LA 10, where a church lost a portion of its metal roof and outbuildings were destroyed. Numerous trees were snapped as well. EF2 damage occurred beyond this point as the tornado moved through densely forested areas of Fort Polk, snapping and uprooting countless trees. A structure sustained loss of its metal roof and collapse of brick facade in this area as well. Exiting Fort Polk, the tornado narrowed and weakened again, causing EF0 to EF1 tree damage is it moved through unpopulated areas. Additional minor EF0 and EF1 tree damage occurred as the tornado continued into Rapides Parish, moving to the northeast as it passed near Hineston and Otis. Restrengthening then occurred as extensive EF2 tree damage occurred near the Kincaid Reservoir. Numerous trees were snapped and denuded, and a few sustained some low-end debarking.

Maintaining EF2 strength, the strong tornado then entered the west side of Alexandria. Numerous mobile homes were thrown and destroyed at a mobile home sales business along Ross Lane, while nearby homes sustained significant roof damage. A few outbuildings were destroyed as well. The tornado strengthened and widened further just past this location, producing EF3 damage along Stovall Road. Several large metal buildings were completely destroyed in this area, and a large portion of the nearby Hope Baptist School was destroyed at EF3 intensity as well, with large amounts of debris scattered throughout the area. The tornado then crossed LA 28 and heavily damaged Johnny Downs sports complex along the north side of the highway. Continuing to the east-northeast, additional EF3 damage occurred as a convenience store was destroyed, and a nearby large metal-framed warehouse building was destroyed as well along John Allison Drive. A manufactured home was overturned in this area as well. In a nearby residential area, the tornado weakened to EF2 strength as large trees were downed, and homes had large portions of their roofs torn off. Continuing to the northeast through Alexandria, the tornado narrowed and weakened to EF1 strength, damaging trees and power poles as it crossed Bayou Rapides Road. Along Enterprise Road, a warehouse building sustained EF1 damage to its roof and doors. The tornado proceeded to cross the Red River and entered Pineville, first causing EF1 damage to structures at the Pineville Municipal Airport. The tornado moved along a northeasterly path through residential areas of Pineville, snapping and uprooting numerous large trees. Some of these trees fell onto houses and caused heavy damage. A majority of the damage in Pineville was rated EF1, though a small pocket of EF2 damage occurred along Edgewood Drive, where a house sustained considerable structural damage. Past this area, the tornado continued to narrow and weaken, eventually dissipating after producing some EF0 tree limb damage along Donahue Ferry Road in Pineville.

Overall, this EF3 tornado caused one fatality along its 62-mile long path. It was on the ground for an hour and 50 minutes and had a peak width of 400 yd (370 m).

=== Laurel–Sandersville–Shubuta–Mannassa, Mississippi/Lisman, Alabama ===
Laurel–Sandersville–Shubuta–Mannassa, Mississippi/Lisman, Alabama
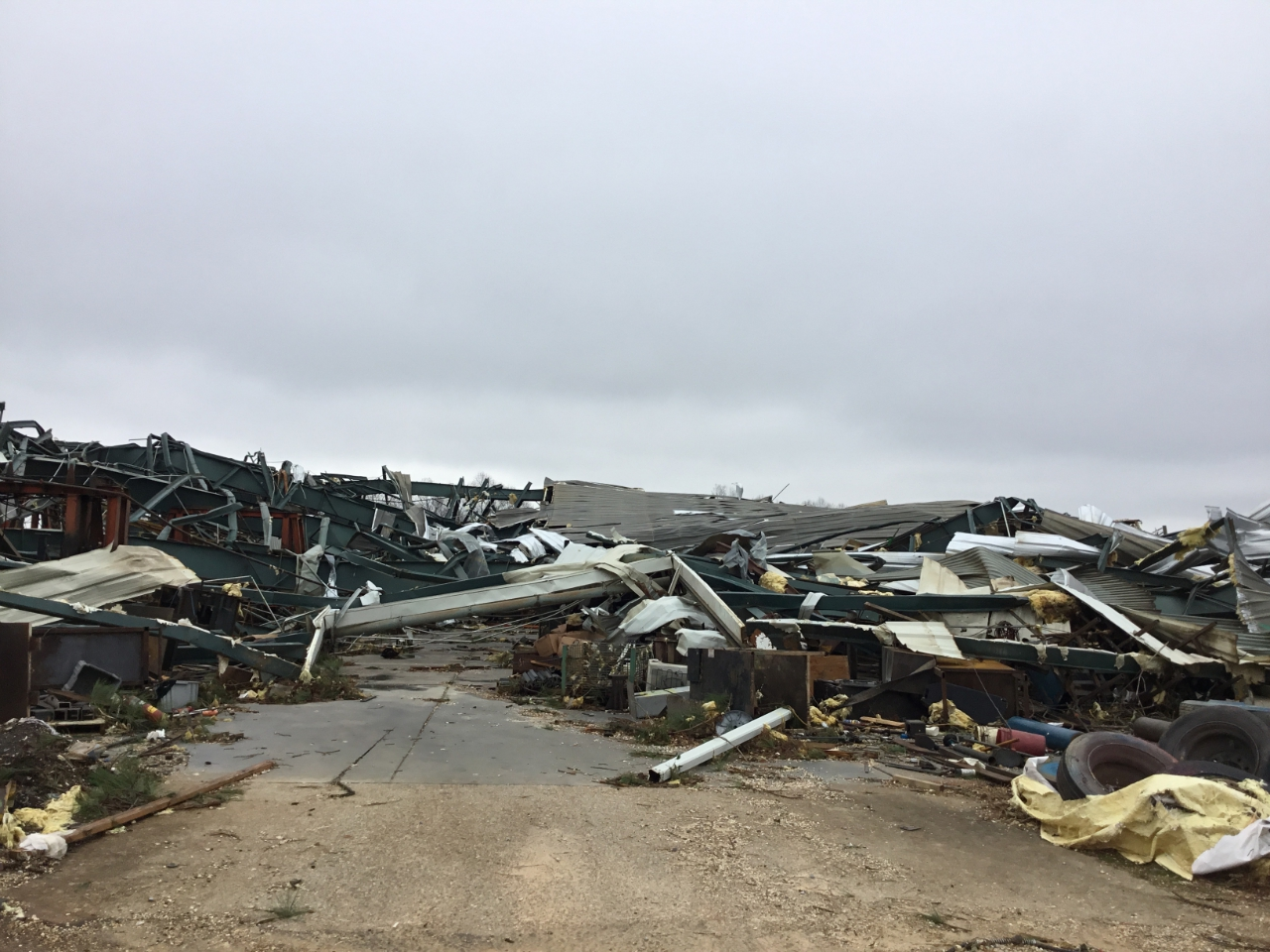
- EF3 damage to the Wade Services manufacturing plant near Laurel, Mississippi.

Meteorological history
- Duration: 1 hour, 30 minutes

Tornado outbreak
- Max. rating: EF3 tornado
- Highest winds: 140 mph (230 km/h)

Overall effects
- Injuries: 2
- Damage: >$1.21 million (2019 USD)

This strong, long-tracked tornado touched down during the late evening hours of December 16, at Hesler Noble Field in southwestern Laurel, Mississippi. Past the airport, the tornado caused EF0 to EF1 damage at the Dixie Golf Club, where trees and tree limbs were snapped, and fencing was blown over. The tornado moved along a northeastward path through the southwest side of Laurel, downing trees and causing minor roof damage to homes. Metal roofing was torn off of a three-story motel along Jefferson Street as well. Damage along this section of the path was rated EF0 to EF1 in intensity. Crossing South 16th Avenue, the tornado reached EF2 strength, where a small brick office building sustained roof and exterior wall loss, and a strip mall was heavily damaged. The roof of a hotel was lifted up and dropped back down onto the building, and a semi-truck and flatbed trailer carrying automobiles was flipped over and dragged. Continuing to the northeast through Laurel, the tornado weakened back to EF1 strength as numerous homes, warehouses, apartment buildings, and other structures sustained minor to moderate roof damage. One large building lost a substantial portion of its metal roof, and sustained collapse of brick facade. A Piggly Wiggly grocery store also sustained minor EF0 roof and exterior damage in this area as well, and numerous trees and a few power poles were downed. The tornado continued to the northeast through residential neighborhoods at EF1 intensity, snapping and uprooting trees and causing roof damage to additional homes. Some trees fell onto houses and cars as well. A metal self-storage building was partially destroyed along North 1st Avenue, and a large warehouse building near North Railroad Avenue sustained considerable roof damage. The tornado reached EF2 intensity again as moved through the eastern part of Laurel, where a house had its roof torn off and other homes sustained lesser roof damage. The Nora Davis Magnet school also lost much of its roof in this area.

The tornado then reached low-end EF3 intensity as it exited Laurel and crossed I-59, snapping and uprooting numerous trees, and toppling several large metal truss transmission towers to the ground. Low-end EF3 damage continued as the tornado then completely destroyed the Wade Services manufacturing plant, along with several other metal buildings and an office building on the property. Northeast of this area, the tornado momentarily weakened and caused EF1 tree damage as it moved along the east side of I-59. The tornado became strong again as it then impacted the southern fringes of Sandersville at EF2 strength, where a house sustained loss of much of its roof, along with some second-floor exterior walls. Another home sustained major roof damage, outbuildings were damaged or destroyed, numerous large trees were snapped or uprooted, and two people sustained minor injuries in the Sandersville area. Past Sandersville, the tornado weakened back to EF1 strength as it struck the Mississippi Choctaw Reservation, where homes sustained roof and garage damage, a small pavilion collapsed, trees were downed, and headstones were tipped over at a cemetery. EF0 and EF1 damage to trees and homes continued through the extreme northwestern corner of Wayne County and into the southwestern corner of Clarke County, though a small pocket of EF2 damage occurred along County Road 223, where numerous large trees were snapped, and a mobile home was rolled and destroyed. Additional EF2 damage occurred as the tornado crossed US 45 north of Shubuta, where a well-built home had most if its roof torn off. Northeast of Shubuta, numerous trees were snapped and uprooted at EF1 strength as the tornado moved through rural areas. A few outbuildings and mobile homes were damaged as well. A final area of EF2 damage occurred to the southwest of the small community of Mannassa, where a well-built home along County Road 664 sustained destruction of its attached garage, and had a large portion of its roof torn off. A nearby mobile home was rolled and destroyed as well. Northeast of Mannassa, the tornado weakened to EF0 strength as it approached the Alabama border, causing only tree limb damage in rural areas. The tornado then regained EF1 strength as it crossed into Choctaw County, Alabama, downing trees and destroying a mobile home. Additional trees were snapped or uprooted, and a house sustained partial removal of its roof before the tornado dissipated to the west-northwest of Lisman, Alabama. In November 2023, this tornado was reanalyzed and the portion of the track in Choctaw County was upgraded from EF1 intensity to high-end EF2 intensity. The track was also lengthened, and the path was widened based on extensive deforestation noted on Planet and Worldview satellite imagery.

The tornado was on the ground for 1.5 hours, traveled 61.81 mi (99.47 km), reached a peak width of 850 yd (780 m), and was rated low-end EF3. Two people were injured.

== Non-tornadic impacts ==
=== Winter storm ===
Four people died due to icy roads in the state of Missouri, with three occurring in a crash along U.S. Route 67 in the eastern part of the state and one occurring on Missouri Route 94 in the central part of the state. Classes on December 16 at the University of Missouri were delayed due to the storm. In Kansas, up to 11 in (28 cm) of snow fell throughout the state, and a 21-year old was killed in Wichita. Another person was killed due to an avalanche in Utah. Two other fatalities occurred in a car crash in Indiana. Four fatalities also occurred in the state of Nebraska, where parts of Interstate 80 heading westbound were shut down.

=== Flooding ===
In the state of Kentucky, one person died due to flooding, while another needed to be rescued. Twelve crashes involving injury also occurred in the state. Parts of U.S. Route 460 were closed as well.

== See also ==
- List of North American tornadoes and tornado outbreaks
