= Brandon Woodruff =

American baseball player (born 1993)

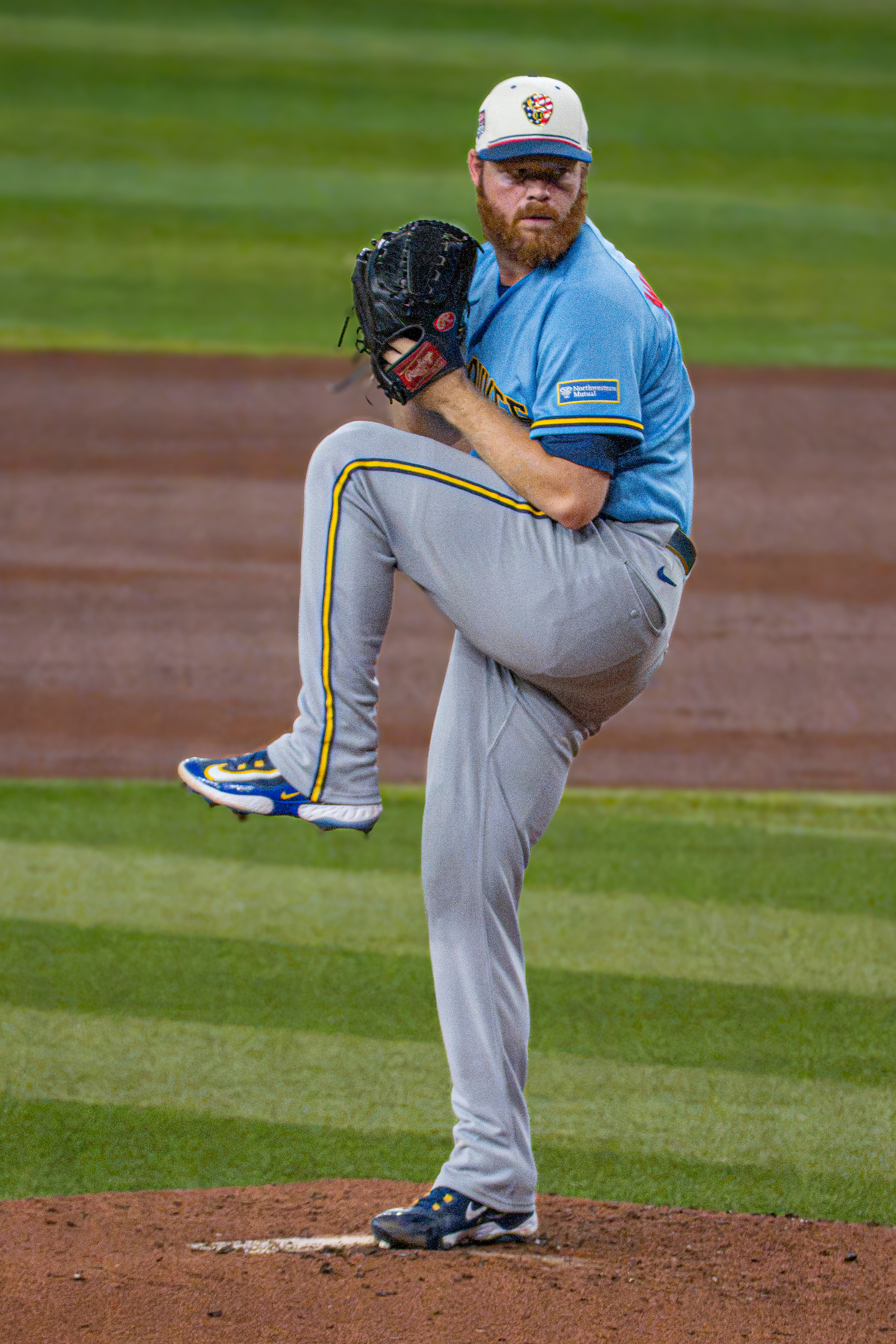
- Woodruff with the Milwaukee Brewers in 2026

Free agent
- Pitcher
- Born: February 10, 1993 (age 33); Tupelo, Mississippi, U.S.
- Bats: Left Throws: Right

MLB debut
- August 4, 2017, for the Milwaukee Brewers

MLB statistics (through 2026 season)
- Win–loss record: 55–30
- Earned run average: 3.10
- Strikeouts: 918
- Stats at Baseball Reference

Teams
- Milwaukee Brewers (2017–2023, 2025–2026)

Career highlights and awards
- World Series champion (2026); 2× All-Star (2019, 2021)

Brandon Kyle Woodruff (born February 10, 1993) is an American professional baseball pitcher who is a free agent. He has played in Major League Baseball (MLB) for the Milwaukee Brewers. He made his MLB debut in 2017 and is a two-time All-Star selection.

== Early life ==
Woodruff attended Wheeler High School in Wheeler, Mississippi, a census-designated place with a population below 500. He reportedly could pitch 60 mph by age 9 and, by 14, was recorded at an all-star event in Oklahoma throwing 94 mph. As a seventh-grader, he was already playing in high school games. Woodruff's No. 25 jersey is retired by his high school's baseball team.

== Career ==
Woodruff attended Wheeler High School in Wheeler, Mississippi, and was drafted by the Texas Rangers in the fifth round of the 2011 MLB draft out of high school. He did not sign with the Rangers and attended Mississippi State University to play college baseball. In 2014, his junior season, he went 1-3 with a 6.75 ERA in 37 innings. In 2012, he played collegiate summer baseball with the Harwich Mariners of the Cape Cod Baseball League. After his junior year he was drafted by the Milwaukee Brewers in the 11th round of the 2014 MLB draft.

Woodruff made his professional debut that year with the Helena Brewers and spent the whole season there, going 1–2 with a 3.28 ERA in 14 games (eight starts). He pitched 2015 with the Brevard County Manatees, compiling a 4–7 record and 3.45 ERA in 21 games (19 starts), and started 2016 there. In May, he was promoted to the Biloxi Shuckers. In July, his brother died following an ATV accident. In his first start since his brother's death, Woodruff threw six shutout innings allowing one hit with nine strikeouts as well as hitting a home run. Woodruff ended 2016 with a combined 14-9 record and 2.68 ERA in 28 starts between both teams.

=== Milwaukee Brewers ===
==== 2017 ====
Woodruff started the 2017 season playing with the Colorado Springs Sky Sox. The Brewers promoted Woodruff to the major leagues on June 13. However, he injured himself warming up and was placed on the injured list. The Brewers recalled Woodruff to make his debut on August 4. He was optioned back to Colorado Springs on August 20 and recalled once again on September 1. In eight starts for Milwaukee, he was 2–3 with a 4.81 ERA, and in 16 starts for Colorado Springs he pitched to a 6-5 record and 4.30 ERA.

==== 2018 ====
MLB.com ranked Woodruff as Milwaukee's third-best prospect going into the 2018 season. He began 2018 with Milwaukee but was optioned to Colorado Springs in early April. During the 2018 MLB regular season, Woodruff pitched in 19 games, starting 4, for 42.1 innings. He had a 3.61 ERA and a WHIP of 1.81.

He opened Game 1 of the NLDS against the Colorado Rockies, pitching three scoreless innings in the Brewers' eventual 3–2 win. In Game 1 of the 2018 National League Championship Series against the Los Angeles Dodgers, Woodruff hit a home run off of Clayton Kershaw. He became the 22nd pitcher and the 3rd relief pitcher in postseason history to accomplish the feat. Woodruff pitched in 4 postseason games, pitching 12.1 innings, with a 2.19 ERA, and a 0.81 WHIP, going 1-1 in his first career postseason run.

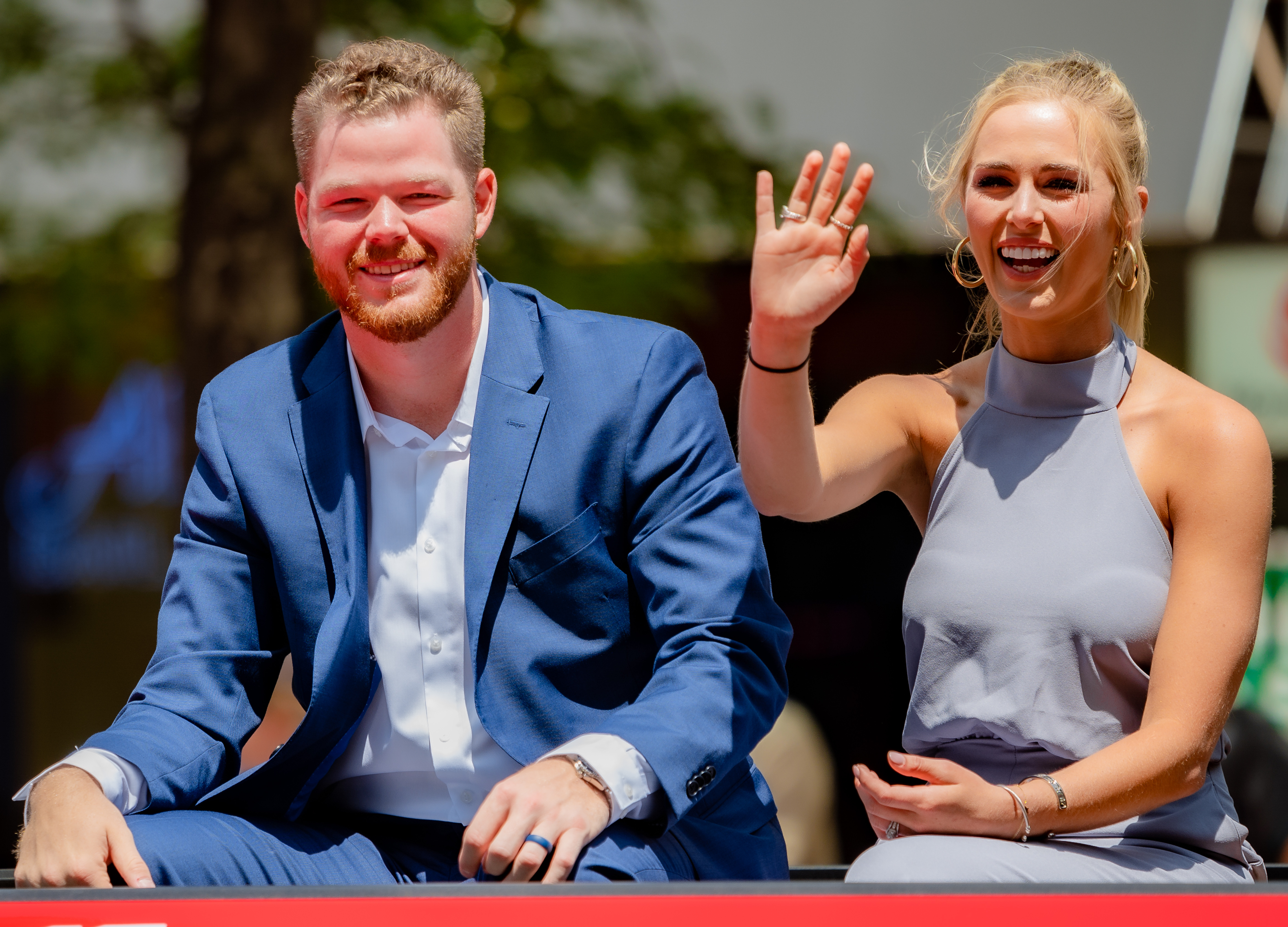
Woodruff and his wife Jonie at the 2019 MLB All-Star Game red carpet parade

==== 2019 ====
In 2019, Woodruff became a full time starter, pitching in 22 games with an 11–3 record and a 3.62 ERA with 143 strikeouts in 121 2/3 innings. He was named to the 2019 MLB All-Star Game, replacing an injured teammate, reliever Josh Hader. In the exhibition, Woodruff gave up one run, one single, and one walk, getting two outs on a double play. He started the Wild Card Game, pitching four innings with his only blemish a home run hit by Trea Turner. The Brewers lost to the eventual World Series champion Washington Nationals, with Hader taking the loss and a blown save.

==== 2020 ====
In the shortened 60-game season, Woodruff started in 13 games, tied for the most in the National League, going 3–5 with a 3.05 ERA and a 0.99 WHIP. He had 91 strikeouts in 73.2 innings, while only walking 18. For the second year in a row, Woodruff started for the Brewers in a Wild Card game, Game 2 of the Wild Card Series, going 4 2/3 innings and allowing 3 runs and 5 hits. The Brewers again lost in the Wild Card round to the team that won the World Series, this year the Dodgers.

==== 2021 ====
Woodruff pitched in a career-high 30 games while having a career-high in strikeouts (211), ERA (2.56), WHIP (0.96), and opponent batting average (.200), earning him his second career all-star appearance and helping the Brewers win the 2021 NL Central Division. In 2 playoff games Woodruff pitched 7.1 innings, giving up 6 hits and 3 runs while striking out 8.

==== 2022 ====
Woodruff had another good season in 2022 going 13-4 in 27 games, pitching 190 innings and striking out 190 batters. He had an ERA of 3.05, a WHIP of 1.07 and an opponent batting average of .215. This would be the first season Woodruff would miss the postseason in his career.

==== 2023 ====
On January 13, 2023, Woodruff signed a one-year, $10.8 million contract with the Brewers, avoiding salary arbitration. Woodruff made two starts for Milwaukee, posting an excellent 0.79 ERA before he was placed on the injured list with shoulder tightness. On April 15, Woodruff was diagnosed with a sub-scapular strain in his throwing shoulder. On May 15, he was transferred on the 60-day injured list. He was activated on August 6 to make a start against the Pittsburgh Pirates. He pitched the first complete-game shutout of his MLB career in a 12–0 home win over the Miami Marlins on September 11. On October 13, it was announced that Woodruff underwent right shoulder surgery to repair his anterior capsule, expecting him to miss most of the 2024 season. The injury occurred ahead of what would have been his final year of salary arbitration, and so instead of receiving a projected $11.6 million in 2024, Woodruff was non-tendered by the Brewers following the 2023 season.

==== 2024 ====
On February 21, 2024, Woodruff re-signed with the Brewers on a two-year deal with a mutual option for a third year.

==== 2025 ====
Woodruff returned to the Brewers in the middle of the 2025 season, having encountered multiple setbacks during minor league rehabilitation starts: right ankle tendonitis that flared up in May at the end of a 30-day rehabilitation period (allowed for players that are nearing a return from the injured list), and a batted ball clipping his right elbow in June.

Woodruff was activated from the injured list on July 6. In his first start for the Brewers that day, Woodruff debuted a new cutter to good effect. In 12 starts for Milwaukee, he logged a 7-2 record and 3.20 ERA with 83 strikeouts across 64 2/3 innings pitched. Woodruff declined his 2026 option on November 3 and became a free agent. On November 18, he accepted the $22 million qualifying offer and returned to the Brewers.

==== 2026 ====
Woodruff (third) with teammates Brice Turang, Jacob Misiorowski, Joey Ortiz, and Sal Frelick during the victory parade for the Brewers after the 2026 World Series

On July 12, 2026, Woodruff was placed on the 60-day injured list. On July 18, it was announced that Woodruff would require season-ending surgery to repair the capsule in his throwing shoulder, necessitating a recovery timetable that threatened his readiness for the 2027 season. To his and his medical team's surprise, though, weeks later the injury showed unexpected healing. Woodruff opted against surgery to attempt to return to the Brewers for the team's upcoming playoffs appearance.

On October 23, 2026, Woodruff was added to the World Series roster. On October 26, 2026, he closed out the 9th inning of Game 3, allowing two hits, one run, and striking out one batter in the Brewers' 10–1 rout of the Rays. The Brewers won the Series in five games.

== Personal life ==
Woodruff is married to Jonie Woodruff. Together they have a daughter and son. Their third child, a son, was born in July 2026.
