= Wheeler, Mississippi =

- Census-designated place
- Location within Mississippi Location within the United States
- Coordinates: 34°35′01″N 88°36′09″W
- Country: United States
- State: Mississippi
- County: Prentiss

Area
  - Total: 1.95 sq mi (5.04 km^{2})
  - Land: 1.95 sq mi (5.04 km^{2})
  - Water: 0 sq mi (0.00 km^{2})
- Elevation: 364 ft (111 m)

Population (2020)
  - Total: 274
  - Density: 140.9/sq mi (54.39/km^{2})
- Time zone: UTC-6 (Central (CST))
  - Summer (DST): UTC-5 (CDT)
- ZIP code: 38880
- Area code: 662
- GNIS feature ID: 2804174

Wheeler is a census-designated place and unincorporated community in Prentiss County, Mississippi. Per the 2020 United States census, the population was 274. Its ZIP code is 38880.

== Demographics ==
Wheeler was first listed as a census designated place in the 2020 U.S. census.

Wheeler CDP, Mississippi – Racial and ethnic composition Note: the US Census treats Hispanic/Latino as an ethnic category. This table excludes Latinos from the racial categories and assigns them to a separate category. Hispanics/Latinos may be of any race.
Race / Ethnicity (NH = Non-Hispanic)	Pop 2020	% 2020
White alone (NH)	257	93.80%
Black or African American alone (NH)	3	1.09%
Native American or Alaska Native alone (NH)	0	0.00%
Asian alone (NH)	1	0.36%
Pacific Islander alone (NH)	0	0.00%
Some Other Race alone (NH)	2	0.73%
Mixed Race or Multi-Racial (NH)	7	2.55%
Hispanic or Latino (any race)	4	1.46%
Total	274	100.00%

== Education ==
Wheeler is in the Prentiss County School District.

== Notable person ==
- Brandon Woodruff, Major League Baseball pitcher
