= Jumpertown, Mississippi =

- Town
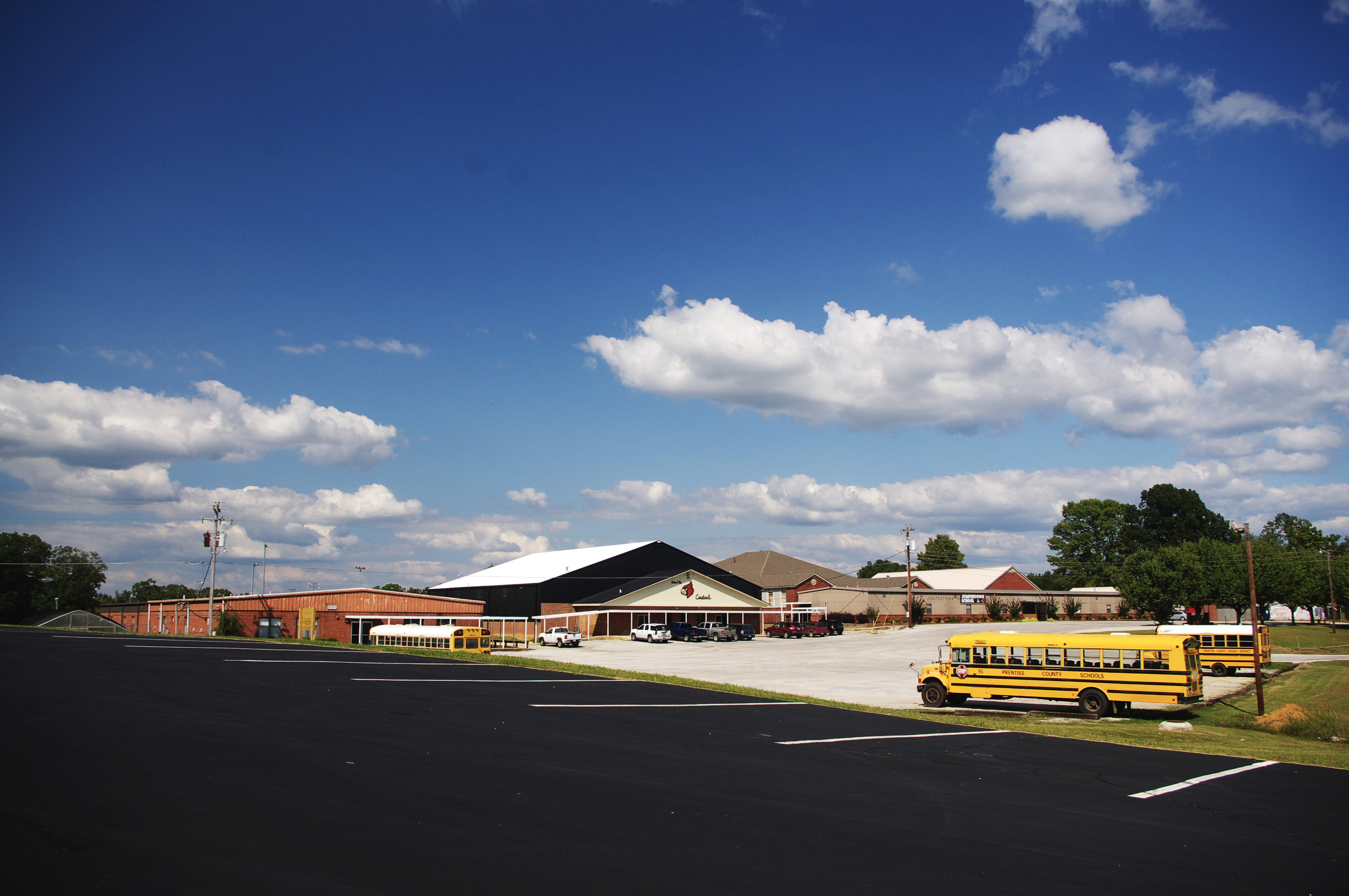
- Jumpertown High School

- Location of Jumpertown, Mississippi

- Location in the United States
- Coordinates: 34°42′29″N 88°39′43″W
- Country: United States
- State: Mississippi
- County: Prentiss

Area
  - Total: 1.79 sq mi (4.63 km^{2})
  - Land: 1.79 sq mi (4.63 km^{2})
  - Water: 0 sq mi (0.00 km^{2})
- Elevation: 548 ft (167 m)

Population (2020)
  - Total: 425
  - Density: 237.6/sq mi (91.74/km^{2})
- Time zone: UTC-6 (Central (CST))
  - Summer (DST): UTC-5 (CDT)
- ZIP code: 38829
- Area code: 662
- FIPS code: 28-37040
- GNIS feature ID: 2405924

Jumpertown is a town in Prentiss County, Mississippi, United States. As of the 2020 census, Jumpertown had a population of 425.

== History ==
On November 5, 1862, there was a civil war skirmish in Jumpertown. In November 1886, the Mississippi state meeting of the Agricultural Wheel, a forerunner of 19th century American populism, met in Jumpertown.

== Geography ==
According to the United States Census Bureau, the town has a total area of 1.8 square miles (4.7 km^{2}), of which 1.8 square miles (4.7 km^{2}) is land and 0.55% is water.

== Demographics ==
Historical population
Census	Pop.	Note	%±
1980	472		—
1990	438		−7.2%
2000	404		−7.8%
2010	480		18.8%
2020	425		−11.5%
U.S. Decennial Census

As of the census of 2000, there were 404 people, 168 households, and 119 families residing in the town. The population density was 223.7 inhabitants per square mile (86.4/km^{2}). There were 173 housing units at an average density of 95.8 per square mile (37.0/km^{2}). The racial makeup of the town was 97.77% White, 1.73% African American, and 0.50% from two or more races. Hispanic or Latino of any race were 2.72% of the population.

There were 168 households, out of which 39.9% had children under the age of 18 living with them, 48.8% were married couples living together, 17.9% had a female householder with no husband present, and 28.6% were non-families. 27.4% of all households were made up of individuals, and 14.9% had someone living alone who was 65 years of age or older. The average household size was 2.40 and the average family size was 2.92.

In the town, the population was spread out, with 28.5% under the age of 18, 8.9% from 18 to 24, 28.2% from 25 to 44, 22.8% from 45 to 64, and 11.6% who were 65 years of age or older. The median age was 33 years. For every 100 females, there were 89.7 males. For every 100 females age 18 and over, there were 79.5 males.

The median income for a household in the town was $21,471, and the median income for a family was $25,000. Males had a median income of $19,464 versus $20,446 for females. The per capita income for the town was $12,122. About 25.4% of families and 24.5% of the population were below the poverty line, including 30.8% of those under age 18 and 32.3% of those age 65 or over.

== Education ==
Jumpertown is served by the Prentiss County School District.
