= Altitude, Mississippi =

- Unincorporated community
- Location within Mississippi Location within the United States
- Coordinates: 34°40′06″N 88°26′35″W
- Country: United States
- State: Mississippi
- County: Prentiss
- Elevation: 440 ft (134 m)
- Time zone: UTC-6 (Central (CST))
  - Summer (DST): UTC-5 (CDT)
- Area code: 662
- GNIS feature ID: 666239

Altitude is an unincorporated community in eastern Prentiss County, Mississippi, United States, about 7.1 miles from downtown Booneville, with a population of less than 100. Children in the area attend schools in the Prentiss County School District.

A post office operated under the name Altitude from 1888 to 1906.
