= Prentiss County School District =

School district in Mississippi

Coordinates: 34.655471°N 88.562302°W

The Prentiss County School District (PCSD) is a public school district based in Booneville, Prentiss County, Mississippi (USA).

In addition to outerlying portions of Booneville, the district also serves the towns of Marietta and Jumpertown, the census-designated places of New Site and Wheeler, and the unincorporated communities of Altitude and Thrasher.

== Schools ==
- New Site High School (Grades 9-12)
  - 2006 National Blue Ribbon School
- Jumpertown School (Grades K-12)
- Thrasher School (Grades K-12)
- Wheeler School (Grades K-12)
- Hills Chapel School (Grades K-8)
- Marietta Elementary School (Grades K-8)

== Demographics ==
=== 2006-07 school year ===
There were a total of 2,233 students enrolled in the Prentiss County School District during the 2006–2007 school year. The gender makeup of the district was 49% female and 51% male. The racial makeup of the district was 6.94% African American, 92.34% White, 0.40% Hispanic, 0.13% Asian, and 0.18% Native American. 51.3% of the district's students were eligible to receive free lunch.

=== Previous school years ===
School Year	Enrollment	Gender Makeup		Racial Makeup				
School Year	Enrollment	Female	Male	Asian	African American	Hispanic	Native American	White
2005-06	2,219	50%	50%	0.09%	6.71%	0.09%	0.18%	92.92%
2004-05	2,155	49%	51%	0.09%	6.45%	0.09%	0.19%	93.18%
2003-04	2,279	50%	50%	0.13%	6.41%	0.26%	0.09%	93.11%
2002-03	2,251	49%	51%	0.09%	6.13%	0.13%	0.04%	93.60%

== Accountability statistics ==
	2006-07	2005-06	2004-05	2003-04	2002-03
District Accreditation Status	Advised	Accredited	Accredited	Accredited	Accredited
School Performance Classifications
Level 5 (Superior Performing) Schools	3	3	3	4	3
Level 4 (Exemplary) Schools	1	2	2	1	2
Level 3 (Successful) Schools	2	1	1	1	1
Level 2 (Under Performing) Schools	0	0	0	0	0
Level 1 (Low Performing) Schools	0	0	0	0	0
Not Assigned	0	0	0	0	0

== See also ==
- List of school districts in Mississippi
