= Thrasher, Mississippi =

- Unincorporated community
- Location within Mississippi Location within the United States
- Coordinates: 34°43′10″N 88°32′02″W
- Country: United States
- State: Mississippi
- County: Prentiss
- Elevation: 482 ft (147 m)
- Time zone: UTC-6 (Central (CST))
  - Summer (DST): UTC-5 (CDT)
- Area code: 662
- GNIS feature ID: 678733

Thrasher is an unincorporated community in Prentiss County, Mississippi, United States.

It was named for John H. Thrasher, a settler appointed as the first postmaster. The hamlet was a flag stop on the Mobile and Ohio Railroad, built in the 1850s.

Thrasher is served by Thrasher School, which teaches kindergarten through 12th grade. The school is part of the Prentiss County School District.

A post office operated under the name Thrasher from 1892 to 1955.
