= Mystic, Georgia =

- Unincorporated community
- Location within Georgia Location within the United States
- Coordinates: 31°37′20″N 83°20′09″W
- Country: United States
- State: Georgia
- County: Irwin
- Elevation: 367 ft (112 m)
- Time zone: UTC-5 (Eastern (EST))
  - Summer (DST): UTC-4 (EDT)
- ZIP code: 31769
- Area code: 229
- GNIS feature ID: 319187

Mystic is an unincorporated community in Irwin County, Georgia, United States. The community is located on Georgia State Route 32, 5.4 miles (8.7 km) west-northwest of Ocilla. Mystic has a post office with ZIP code 31769, which opened on July 6, 1896. It is described as a "tight-knit community" where "everyone knows everyone", 2.5 hours south of Atlanta.

== History ==
A post office was established at Mystic in 1896. The community was named after Mystic, Connecticut, the former home of an early settler. The Georgia General Assembly incorporated Mystic as a town in 1903. The town's municipal charter was repealed in 1995. One reference states that Mystic was the original home of Nelson Tift, founder of Albany, Georgia, but it is perhaps equally likely that the homestead was that of Henry Harding Tift, for whom nearby Tift County was named.

Mystic was struck by a tornado on December 17, 2019, which did significant damage to the community and several buildings.
