= New Site, Mississippi =

- Census-designated place
- Location within Mississippi Location within the United States
- Coordinates: 34°33′19″N 88°24′55″W
- Country: United States
- State: Mississippi
- County: Prentiss

Area
  - Total: 2.58 sq mi (6.67 km^{2})
  - Land: 2.58 sq mi (6.67 km^{2})
  - Water: 0 sq mi (0.00 km^{2})
- Elevation: 394 ft (120 m)

Population (2020)
  - Total: 122
  - Density: 47.4/sq mi (18.29/km^{2})
- Time zone: UTC-6 (Central (CST))
  - Summer (DST): UTC-5 (CDT)
- ZIP code: 38859
- Area code: 662
- GNIS feature ID: 2812739

New Site is a census-designated place and unincorporated community in Prentiss County, Mississippi, United States. Its population was 851 at the 2010 U.S. census. Its ZIP code is 38859.

The settlement once had a post office. The population in 1900 was 21.

Pern the 2020 Census, the population was 122.

== Demographics ==
New Site was first listed as a census designated place in the 2020 U.S. census.

=== 2020 census ===
New Site CDP, Mississippi – Racial and ethnic composition Note: the US Census treats Hispanic/Latino as an ethnic category. This table excludes Latinos from the racial categories and assigns them to a separate category. Hispanics/Latinos may be of any race.
Race / Ethnicity (NH = Non-Hispanic)	Pop 2020	% 2020
White alone (NH)	116	95.08%
Black or African American alone (NH)	0	0.00%
Native American or Alaska Native alone (NH)	0	0.00%
Asian alone (NH)	0	0.00%
Pacific Islander alone (NH)	0	0.00%
Some Other Race alone (NH)	0	0.00%
Mixed Race or Multi-Racial (NH)	1	0.82%
Hispanic or Latino (any race)	5	4.10%
Total	122	100.00%

== Education ==
It is in the Prentiss County School District.
