= Prentiss County, Mississippi =

County in Mississippi, United States

- County
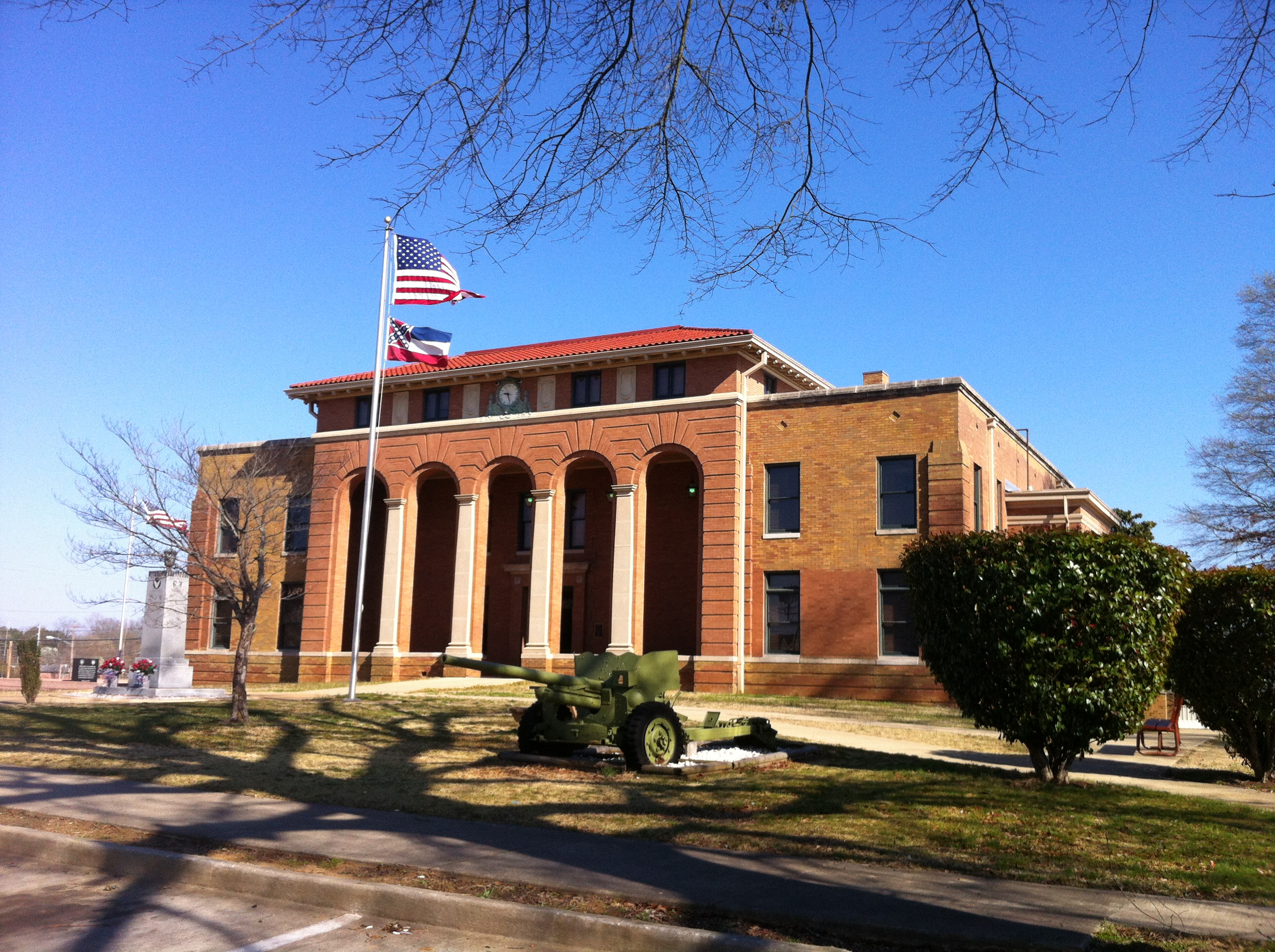
- Prentiss County Courthouse in Booneville

- Location within the U.S. state of Mississippi
- Coordinates: 34°37′N 88°31′W
- Country: United States
- State: Mississippi
- Founded: April 15, 1870 (156 years ago)
- Named for: Seargent Smith Prentiss
- Seat: Booneville
- Largest city: Booneville

Area
  - Total: 418 sq mi (1,080 km^{2})
  - Land: 415 sq mi (1,070 km^{2})
  - Water: 3.2 sq mi (8.3 km^{2}) 0.8%

Population (2020)
  - Total: 25,008
  - Estimate (2025): 25,284 ▲
  - Density: 60.3/sq mi (23.3/km^{2})
- Time zone: UTC−6 (Central)
  - Summer (DST): UTC−5 (CDT)
- Congressional district: 1st
- Website: www.prentisscounty.org

Prentiss County is a county located in the U.S. state of Mississippi. As of the 2020 census, the population was 25,008. Its county seat is Booneville. The county is named for Seargent Smith Prentiss, a noted speaker and US Congressman from Natchez.

== Geography ==
According to the U.S. Census Bureau, the county has a total area of 418 square miles (1,080 km^{2}), of which 415 square miles (1,070 km^{2}) is land and 3.2 square miles (8.3 km^{2}) (0.8%) is water.

=== Major highways ===
- U.S. Highway 45
- Mississippi Highway 4
- Mississippi Highway 30
- Mississippi Highway 145

=== Adjacent counties ===
- Alcorn County (north)
- Tishomingo County (east)
- Itawamba County (southeast)
- Lee County (southwest)
- Union County (west)
- Tippah County (northwest)

=== National protected area ===
- Natchez Trace Parkway (part)

== Demographics ==
Historical population
Census	Pop.	Note	%±
1870	9,348		—
1880	12,158		30.1%
1890	13,679		12.5%
1900	15,788		15.4%
1910	16,931		7.2%
1920	17,606		4.0%
1930	19,265		9.4%
1940	20,921		8.6%
1950	19,810		−5.3%
1960	17,949		−9.4%
1970	20,133		12.2%
1980	24,025		19.3%
1990	23,278		−3.1%
2000	25,556		9.8%
2010	25,276		−1.1%
2020	25,008		−1.1%
2025 (est.)	25,284	▲	1.1%
U.S. Decennial Census; 1790-1960 1900-1990; 1990-2000 2010-2013

=== Racial and ethnic composition ===
Prentiss County, Mississippi – Racial and ethnic composition Note: the US Census treats Hispanic/Latino as an ethnic category. This table excludes Latinos from the racial categories and assigns them to a separate category. Hispanics/Latinos may be of any race.
Race / Ethnicity (NH = Non-Hispanic)	Pop 1980	Pop 1990	Pop 2000	Pop 2010	Pop 2020	% 1980	% 1990	% 2000	% 2010	% 2020
White alone (NH)	21,310	20,397	21,845	21,172	20,166	88.70%	87.62%	85.48%	83.76%	80.64%
Black or African American alone (NH)	2,543	2,739	3,285	3,481	3,547	10.58%	11.77%	12.85%	13.77%	14.18%
Native American or Alaska Native alone (NH)	23	24	43	29	62	0.10%	0.10%	0.17%	0.11%	0.25%
Asian alone (NH)	19	23	40	33	85	0.08%	0.10%	0.16%	0.13%	0.34%
Native Hawaiian or Pacific Islander alone (NH)	x	x	0	2	5	x	x	0.00%	0.01%	0.02%
Other race alone (NH)	0	1	5	18	47	0.00%	0.00%	0.02%	0.07%	0.19%
Mixed race or Multiracial (NH)	x	x	162	234	691	x	x	0.63%	0.93%	2.76%
Hispanic or Latino (any race)	130	94	176	307	405	0.54%	0.40%	0.69%	1.21%	1.62%
Total	24,025	23,278	25,556	25,276	25,008	100.00%	100.00%	100.00%	100.00%	100.00%

=== 2020 census ===
As of the 2020 census, the county had a population of 25,008. The median age was 39.0 years. 22.3% of residents were under the age of 18 and 17.6% of residents were 65 years of age or older. For every 100 females there were 93.1 males, and for every 100 females age 18 and over there were 88.6 males age 18 and over.

The racial makeup of the county was 81.2% White, 14.3% Black or African American, 0.3% American Indian and Alaska Native, 0.3% Asian, <0.1% Native Hawaiian and Pacific Islander, 0.8% from some other race, and 3.2% from two or more races. Hispanic or Latino residents of any race comprised 1.6% of the population.

25.7% of residents lived in urban areas, while 74.3% lived in rural areas.

There were 9,616 households in the county, of which 30.8% had children under the age of 18 living in them. Of all households, 46.6% were married-couple households, 18.1% were households with a male householder and no spouse or partner present, and 30.0% were households with a female householder and no spouse or partner present. About 29.0% of all households were made up of individuals and 13.3% had someone living alone who was 65 years of age or older.

There were 10,972 housing units, of which 12.4% were vacant. Among occupied housing units, 72.2% were owner-occupied and 27.8% were renter-occupied. The homeowner vacancy rate was 1.8% and the rental vacancy rate was 11.4%.

=== 2000 census ===
As of the census of 2000, there were 25,556 people, 9,821 households, and 7,169 families living in the county. The population density was 62 people per square mile (24 people/km^{2}). There were 10,681 housing units at an average density of 26 units per square mile (10 units/km^{2}). The racial makeup of the county was 85.85% White, 12.94% Black or African American, 0.18% Native American, 0.16% Asian, 0.17% from other races, and 0.70% from two or more races. 0.69% of the population were Hispanic or Latino of any race.

In 2000 there were 9,821 households, out of which 33.70% had children under the age of 18 living with them, 56.30% were married couples living together, 12.60% had a female householder with no husband present, and 27.00% were non-families. 24.90% of all households were made up of individuals, and 12.00% had someone living alone who was 65 years of age or older. The average household size was 2.52 and the average family size was 3.00.

In the county, the population was spread out, with 25.00% under the age of 18, 11.60% from 18 to 24, 27.10% from 25 to 44, 22.40% from 45 to 64, and 13.90% who were 65 years of age or older. The median age was 35 years. For every 100 females there were 94.10 males. For every 100 females age 18 and over, there were 89.40 males.

The median income for a household in the county was $28,446, and the median income for a family was $35,125. Males had a median income of $26,862 versus $19,766 for females. The per capita income for the county was $14,131. About 13.10% of families and 16.50% of the population were below the poverty line, including 18.60% of those under age 18 and 22.40% of those age 65 or over.

== Communities ==
=== Cities ===
- Baldwyn (partly in Lee County)
- Booneville (county seat)

=== Towns ===
- Jumpertown
- Marietta

=== Census-designated places ===
- New Site
- Wheeler

=== Unincorporated communities ===
- Altitude
- Blackland
- Hobo Station
- Thrasher

== Politics ==
Prentiss County has become a Republican powerhouse, having last supported a Democrat in 1980. Since 1996 the Republican strength in the county has increased in every presidential election, and in 2024 Prentiss was one of 12 counties in the state where the Republican candidate received over 80% of the vote.

United States presidential election results for Prentiss County, Mississippi
Year	Republican		Democratic		Third party(ies)	
Year	No.	%	No.	%	No.	%
1912	85	7.74%	839	76.41%	174	15.85%
1916	164	10.66%	1,342	87.26%	32	2.08%
1920	496	32.27%	992	64.54%	49	3.19%
1924	179	12.73%	1,225	87.13%	2	0.14%
1928	269	16.45%	1,366	83.55%	0	0.00%
1932	76	3.70%	1,976	96.30%	0	0.00%
1936	50	2.68%	1,809	97.10%	4	0.21%
1940	118	5.28%	2,117	94.72%	0	0.00%
1944	175	9.58%	1,652	90.42%	0	0.00%
1948	74	4.44%	602	36.16%	989	59.40%
1952	731	21.48%	2,672	78.52%	0	0.00%
1956	383	15.96%	1,942	80.95%	74	3.08%
1960	740	24.79%	1,777	59.53%	468	15.68%
1964	2,289	69.32%	1,013	30.68%	0	0.00%
1968	723	11.63%	440	7.08%	5,055	81.30%
1972	4,607	91.12%	398	7.87%	51	1.01%
1976	2,362	33.85%	4,431	63.51%	184	2.64%
1980	3,264	39.91%	4,832	59.09%	82	1.00%
1984	4,821	62.35%	2,897	37.47%	14	0.18%
1988	4,348	55.09%	3,429	43.45%	115	1.46%
1992	4,317	50.63%	3,385	39.70%	824	9.66%
1996	3,473	48.73%	3,053	42.84%	601	8.43%
2000	5,101	60.14%	3,287	38.75%	94	1.11%
2004	6,538	65.83%	3,327	33.50%	67	0.67%
2008	7,703	70.39%	3,020	27.60%	221	2.02%
2012	7,075	70.52%	2,817	28.08%	141	1.41%
2016	7,648	77.47%	2,067	20.94%	157	1.59%
2020	8,370	78.64%	2,153	20.23%	121	1.14%
2024	8,581	82.66%	1,727	16.64%	73	0.70%

== Education ==
School districts include:

- Baldwyn School District
- Booneville School District
- Prentiss County School District

Northeast Mississippi Community College is the community college for Prentiss County.

== See also ==
- Moist county
- National Register of Historic Places listings in Prentiss County, Mississippi
- Jacinto, historic county seat of Prentiss' parent county, Old Tishomingo County, Mississippi
