= Morgan Springs, Alabama =

Unincorporated community in Brownsville, Alabama

- Unincorporated community
- Location within Alabama Location within the United States
- Coordinates: 32°44′43″N 87°24′57″W
- Country: United States
- State: Alabama
- County: Perry
- Elevation: 384 ft (117 m)
- Time zone: UTC-6 (Central (CST))
  - Summer (DST): UTC-5 (CDT)
- Area code: 334
- GNIS feature ID: 155156

Morgan Springs, also known as Morgan Spring, Morganspring, or Crawford, is an unincorporated community in Perry County, Alabama, United States.

== History ==
Morgan Springs is named after a group of nearby springs, which in turn are named for William Morgan, an early settler of the area. A post office operated under the name Morgan Springs from 1857 to 1925.
