= Rock Hill, Georgia =

Unincorporated community in Georgia, U.S.

Coordinates: 31°19′42″N 85°01′54″W

Rock Hill is an unincorporated community in Early County, in the U.S. state of Georgia.

== History ==
The community was named for a rocky hill near the original town site.
