= Bellevue, Bossier Parish, Louisiana =

Bellevue, Louisiana
- Unincorporated community
- Location within Louisiana Location within the United States
- Coordinates: 32°40′24″N 93°31′20″W
- Country: United States
- State: Louisiana
- Parish: Bossier
- Elevation: 285 ft (87 m)
- Time zone: UTC-6 (Central (CST))
  - Summer (DST): UTC-5 (CDT)
- Area code: 318
- GNIS feature ID: 553590

Bellevue (also Fredonia, Freedonia, Society Hill) is an unincorporated community in Bossier Parish, Louisiana, United States.

== Notable people ==
- Guitar Gable (1937–2017), musician, was born in Bellevue.
