= Ashton, Georgia =

Unincorporated community in Georgia, U.S.

Coordinates: 31°42′18″N 83°09′22″W

Ashton is an unincorporated community in Ben Hill County, in the U.S. state of Georgia.

== History ==
A post office called Ashton was established in 1901, and remained in operation until 1907. The community had a railroad depot on the Atlantic and Birmingham railroad. Ashton once had a schoolhouse, now defunct.
