= Gary Springs, Alabama =

Unincorporated community in Alabama, United States

- Unincorporated community
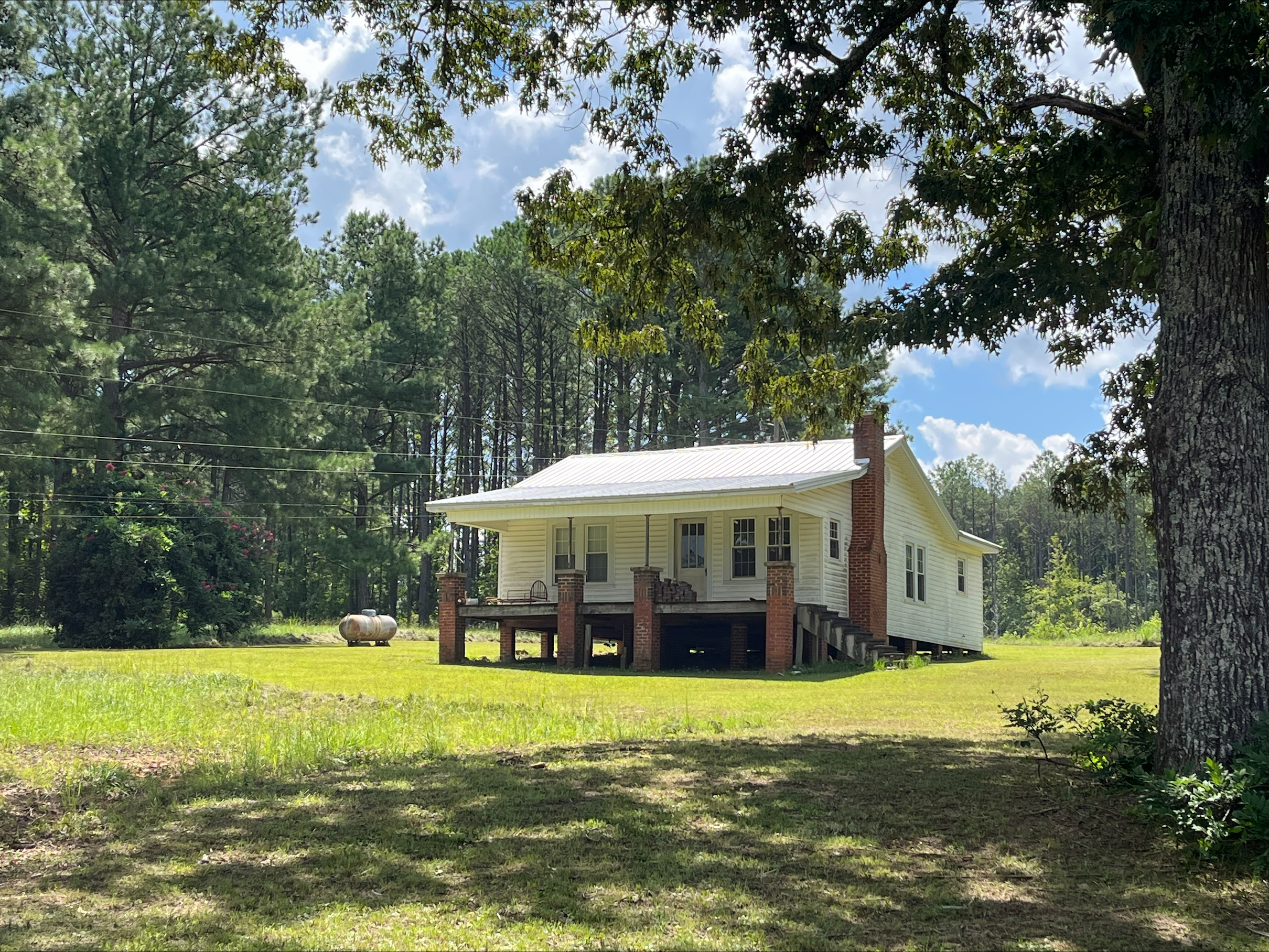
- Home in Gary Springs

- Location within Alabama Location within the United States
- Coordinates: 32°58′03″N 87°05′17″W
- Country: United States
- State: Alabama
- County: Bibb
- Elevation: 315 ft (96 m)
- Time zone: UTC-6 (Central (CST))
  - Summer (DST): UTC-5 (CDT)
- Area codes: 205, 659
- GNIS feature ID: 159654

Gary Springs (also Brown Springs, Garey Springs) is an unincorporated community in Bibb County, Alabama, United States.

The community is named for the mineral springs located there. The water from the springs contains large quantities of epsom salts. The springs were named for Dr. Thomas P. Gary, a physician from Selma who developed the springs.
