= Bogue Chitto, Lincoln County, Mississippi =

- Census-designated place
- Location in Mississippi Location in the United States
- Coordinates: 31°26′20″N 90°27′08″W
- Country: United States
- State: Mississippi
- County: Lincoln

Area
  - Total: 2.26 sq mi (5.85 km^{2})
  - Land: 2.26 sq mi (5.85 km^{2})
  - Water: 0 sq mi (0.0 km^{2})
- Elevation: 404 ft (123 m)

Population (2020)
  - Total: 437
  - Density: 231/sq mi (89.2/km^{2})
- Time zone: UTC-6 (Central (CST))
  - Summer (DST): UTC-5 (CDT)
- ZIP code: 39629
- FIPS code: 28-07322
- GNIS feature ID: 667378

Bogue Chitto is an unincorporated community and census-designated place (CDP) in Lincoln County, Mississippi, United States. As of the 2020 census, it had a population of 437. Bogue Chitto is the only municipal hamlet in the state of Mississippi.

== History ==
Bogue Chitto takes its name from the nearby Bogue Chitto River, the name of which is a Choctaw word, Bok Chito, meaning "big river". Originally before Lincoln County was formed, the north part of the community was in Lawrence County and the southern portion in Pike County. There is a plat of the Pike portion filed in the courthouse with the name Atopisaw. The Atopisaw plat also has the name Boguechitto in the notes on the plat. It is likely the community was known as Atopisaw prior to the arrival of the railroad and it is believed that the railroad used the name Bogue Chitto for its depot. It was not uncommon for a depot name to be different from the town name. By 1866 the spelling Bogue Chitto was common for the community instead of Boguechitto.

The population in 1900 was 582. At that time, the settlement had telephone and telegraph services, a school, and several churches. The local economy involved the lumber industry, and a lumber mill and cotton gin were located there.

The settlement is located on the main line of the Illinois Central Railroad, which is owned by the Canadian National Railway. The railroad was originally built by the New Orleans, Jackson and Great Northern Railroad in 1857. The railroad established stations every 10 miles with Bogue Chitto being one of them.

=== 2026 tornado ===
During the late evening of May 6, 2026, a mobile home park near Bogue Chitto was struck by a large, extremely long-tracked, low-end EF3 tornado, with winds estimated at 137 miles per hour. The tornado tracked 81.9 miles through southern Mississippi, injuring 23 people, but causing no fatalities. The tornado was part of a small outbreak in the deep south, with 10 tornadoes being confirmed in the outbreak.

== Geography ==
Bogue Chitto is in southern Lincoln County, west of the Bogue Chitto River and east of Interstate 55, which provides access to the town at Exit 30 (Bogue Chitto Road). I-55 leads north 65 miles (105 km) to Jackson, the state capital, and south the same distance to Hammond, Louisiana. U.S. Route 51 runs through the community, just west of the center of town and parallel to I-55. US 51 leads north 10 miles (16 km) to Brookhaven, the Lincoln county seat, and south 14 miles (23 km) to McComb.

According to the U.S. Census Bureau, the Bogue Chitto CDP has an area of 2.2 square miles (5.8 km^{2}), all of it recorded as land. The Bogue Chitto River flows south past the community, then southeast into Louisiana, where it joins the Pearl River twenty miles inland.

== Demographics ==
Historical population
Census	Pop.	Note	%±
2010	522		—
2020	437		−16.3%
U.S. Decennial Census; 2010 2020

Bogue Chitto (Lincoln County) first appeared as a census designated place in the 2010 U.S. census.

=== Racial and ethnic composition ===
Bogue Chitto CDP, Lincoln County, Mississippi – Racial and ethnic composition Note: the US Census treats Hispanic/Latino as an ethnic category. This table excludes Latinos from the racial categories and assigns them to a separate category. Hispanics/Latinos may be of any race.
Race / Ethnicity (NH = Non-Hispanic)	Pop 2010	Pop 2020	% 2010	% 2020
White alone (NH)	234	182	44.83%	41.65%
Black or African American alone (NH)	277	230	53.07%	52.63%
Native American or Alaska Native alone (NH)	0	2	0.00%	0.46%
Asian alone (NH)	1	0	0.19%	0.00%
Native Hawaiian or Pacific Islander alone (NH)	0	0	0.00%	0.00%
Other race alone (NH)	0	0	0.00%	0.00%
Mixed race or Multiracial (NH)	4	16	0.77%	3.66%
Hispanic or Latino (any race)	6	7	1.15%	1.60%
Total	522	437	100.00%	100.00%

=== 2020 census ===
As of the 2020 United States census, there were 437 people, 110 households, and 80 families residing in the CDP.

== Education ==
Bogue Chitto is part of the Lincoln County School District. The Bogue Chitto School serves area students in grades K-12. The community's first school was the Bogue Chitto Academy located on the southwest corner of Morgan and South Streets in 1897. In 1923 a new school was built at the current location on Monticello Street. The original Art Deco-style building was demolished in 2003 by Jackson Salvage Company.

== Notable people ==
- L.O. Crosby Sr., timber industrialist
