= Saratoga, Mississippi =

- Unincorporated community
- Location within Mississippi Location within the United States
- Coordinates: 31°47′49″N 89°40′39″W
- Country: United States
- State: Mississippi
- County: Simpson
- Elevation: 341 ft (104 m)
- Time zone: UTC-6 (Central (CST))
  - Summer (DST): UTC-5 (CDT)
- Area codes: 601 & 769
- GNIS feature ID: 692209

Saratoga is an unincorporated community in Simpson County, in the U.S. state of Mississippi.

== History ==
Saratoga is located on the Canadian National Railway and once had a railroad depot.

In 1906, Saratoga was home to two sawmills, a planing mill, a general store and a bottleworks.

A post office called Saratoga was established in 1900, and remained in operation until 1920. The community's name is a transfer from Saratoga, in Upstate New York. A variant name is "Togey".
