= HAHS =

HAHS may refer to:

- Don Hahs (born 1942), American labor leader
- Hayward Area Historical Society in Hayward, California, United States
- Hempfield Area High School, Westmoreland County, Pennsylvania, United States
- Hinds Agricultural High School, Utica, Mississippi, United States
- Historic Artists' Homes and Studios, a program of the National Trust for Historic Preservation in the United States
- Hurlstone Agricultural High School, Sydney, New South Wales, Australia
