= Dixie, Mississippi =

- Unincorporated community
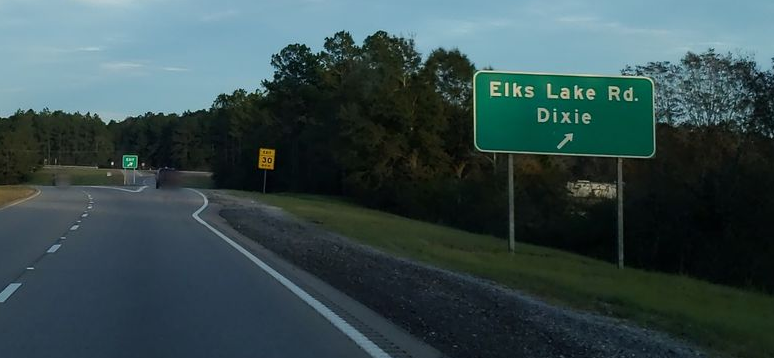
- Exit sign for Dixie on US 98 eastbound

- Location within the state of Mississippi
- Coordinates: 31°12′55″N 89°18′13″W
- Country: United States
- State: Mississippi
- County: Forrest
- Time zone: UTC-6 (Central (CST))
  - Summer (DST): UTC-5 (CDT)
- ZIP codes: 39401
- Area code(s): 601, 769
- GNIS feature ID: 691818

Dixie is a small unincorporated community in central Forrest County, Mississippi. It is part of the Hattiesburg, Mississippi Metropolitan Statistical Area.

== History ==
Dixie was settled mainly as a farming community. Its settlement predates the establishment of Hattiesburg.

== Geography ==
Dixie is located at latitude 31.215178, longitude -89.303673. Interstate 59 lies to the west, Highway 49 is to the east, and Hattiesburg is just north of Dixie.

== Transportation ==
Dixie is served by Interstate 59, U.S. Route 49 and U.S. Route 98. Elks Lake Road, a county road that runs through the community, was once part of the U.S. Highway 49 West configuration between Brooklyn and Hattiesburg in the 1930s.

== Education ==
The Dixie community is served by the Forrest County School District. Dixie Attendance Center, a K-8 school, is located in the community. High school students attend Forrest County Agricultural High School in nearby Brooklyn.

== Places of worship ==
- Dixie Baptist Church
- Dixie United Methodist Church

== Recreation ==
- Black Creek, Mississippi's only National Wild and Scenic River, a popular destination for canoeing, fishing, and camping.
- De Soto National Forest, a national forest nearby.

== Climate ==
The climate in this area is characterized by relatively high temperatures and evenly distributed precipitation throughout the year. According to the Köppen Climate Classification system, Dixie has a Humid subtropical climate, abbreviated "Cfa" on climate maps.

== Notable person ==
- Kristi Addis, Miss Teen USA 1987

== See also ==
Black Creek Wilderness
