= Utica, Mississippi =

- Town
- Location of Utica, Mississippi

- Location in the United States
- Coordinates: 32°06′21″N 90°37′20″W
- Country: United States
- State: Mississippi
- County: Hinds

Government
  - Type: Mayor-Council

Area
  - Total: 3.00 sq mi (7.78 km^{2})
  - Land: 3.00 sq mi (7.76 km^{2})
  - Water: 0.0077 sq mi (0.02 km^{2})
- Elevation: 285 ft (87 m)

Population (2020)
  - Total: 779
  - Density: 210/sq mi (82/km^{2})
- Time zone: UTC-6 (Central (CST))
  - Summer (DST): UTC-5 (CDT)
- ZIP code: 39175
- Area code: 601
- FIPS code: 28-75760
- GNIS feature ID: 2406782
- Website: www.uticams.org

Utica is a town in Hinds County, Mississippi, United States. As of the 2020 census, Utica had a population of 636. Utica is part of the Jackson, Mississippi metropolitan area.

== History ==
Utica was originally an area known as Cane Ridge. In 1837, it was given the name Utica at the suggestion of the then postmaster, Ozias Osborn, who came from Utica, New York. The town was incorporated in 1880.

Utica was located on the Yazoo and Mississippi Valley Railroad. A weekly newspaper, the Herald, was established in 1897. In the early 1900s, Utica had several churches, eight hotels, a public school for white students, and an industrial college for black students. Agriculture consisted of watermelons, cotton and timber. The settlement had a sawmill, three cotton gins, and a brick plant. The population in 1907 was nearly 1,000.

== Geography ==
Utica is in southwest Hinds County at the junctions of Mississippi Highways 18 and 27. Highway 18 leads northeast 32 miles (51 km) to Jackson, the state capital, and southwest 28 miles (45 km) to Port Gibson, while Highway 27 leads northwest 25 miles (40 km) to Vicksburg and southeast 20 miles (32 km) to Crystal Springs.

According to the United States Census Bureau, Utica has a total area of 3.0 square miles (7.8 km^{2}), of which 0.01 square miles (0.02 km^{2}), or 0.25%, are water.

=== Climate ===
The climate in this area is characterized by relatively high temperatures and evenly distributed precipitation throughout the year. According to the Köppen Climate Classification system, Utica has a humid subtropical climate, abbreviated "Cfa" on climate maps.

Climate data for Utica, Mississippi
Month	Jan	Feb	Mar	Apr	May	Jun	Jul	Aug	Sep	Oct	Nov	Dec	Year
Mean daily maximum °C (°F)	16 (60)	17 (63)	21 (70)	25 (77)	29 (84)	33 (91)	33 (92)	34 (93)	32 (89)	27 (80)	21 (69)	16 (61)	25 (77)
Mean daily minimum °C (°F)	3 (38)	4 (40)	8 (46)	12 (53)	16 (60)	19 (67)	21 (70)	21 (70)	18 (64)	12 (53)	7 (44)	4 (39)	12 (54)
Average precipitation mm (inches)	120 (4.8)	120 (4.7)	140 (5.6)	130 (5.2)	120 (4.7)	100 (4.1)	120 (4.8)	89 (3.5)	69 (2.7)	64 (2.5)	91 (3.6)	130 (5.2)	1,310 (51.5)
Source: Weatherbase

== Demographics ==
Historical population
Census	Pop.	Note	%±
1880	230		—
1890	370		60.9%
1900	540		45.9%
1910	572		5.9%
1920	445		−22.2%
1930	652		46.5%
1940	818		25.5%
1950	824		0.7%
1960	764		−7.3%
1970	1,019		33.4%
1980	1,064		4.4%
1990	1,033		−2.9%
2000	966		−6.5%
2010	820		−15.1%
2020	636		−22.4%
U.S. Decennial Census

=== Racial and ethnic composition ===
Utica town, Mississippi – Racial and ethnic composition Note: the US Census treats Hispanic/Latino as an ethnic category. This table excludes Latinos from the racial categories and assigns them to a separate category. Hispanics/Latinos may be of any race.
Race / Ethnicity (NH = Non-Hispanic)	Pop 2000	Pop 2010	Pop 2020	% 2000	% 2010	% 2020
White alone (NH)	285	220	129	29.50%	26.83%	20.28%
Black or African American alone (NH)	634	525	429	65.63%	64.02%	67.45%
Native American or Alaska Native alone (NH)	1	1	6	0.10%	0.12%	0.94%
Asian alone (NH)	3	0	0	0.31%	0.00%	0.00%
Native Hawaiian or Pacific Islander alone (NH)	0	0	0	0.00%	0.00%	0.00%
Other race alone (NH)	0	2	1	0.00%	0.24%	0.16%
Mixed race or Multiracial (NH)	6	1	11	0.62%	0.12%	1.73%
Hispanic or Latino (any race)	37	71	60	3.83%	8.66%	9.43%
Total	966	820	636	100.00%	100.00%	100.00%

=== 2020 census ===
As of the 2020 United States census, there were 636 people, 337 households, and 199 families residing in the town.

=== 2010 census ===
As of the 2010 United States census, there were 820 people living in the town. The racial makeup of the town was 64.0% Black, 26.8% White, 0.1% Native American, 0.2% from some other race and 0.1% from two or more races. 8.7% were Hispanic or Latino of any race.

=== 2000 census ===
As of the census of 2000, there were 966 people, 339 households, and 241 families living in the town. The population density was 323.0 inhabitants per square mile (124.7/km^{2}). There were 397 housing units at an average density of 132.7 per square mile (51.2/km^{2}). The racial makeup of the town was 30.54% White, 66.36% African American, 0.10% Native American, 0.31% Asian, 2.07% from other races, and 0.62% from two or more races. Hispanic or Latino of any race were 3.83% of the population.

There were 339 households, out of which 29.5% had children under the age of 18 living with them, 37.8% were married couples living together, 27.4% had a female householder with no husband present, and 28.9% were non-families. 26.0% of all households were made up of individuals, and 15.0% had someone living alone who was 65 years of age or older. The average household size was 2.85 and the average family size was 3.43.

In the town, the population was spread out, with 28.8% under the age of 18, 11.7% from 18 to 24, 24.8% from 25 to 44, 18.3% from 45 to 64, and 16.4% who were 65 years of age or older. The median age was 32 years. For every 100 females there were 94.4 males. For every 100 females age 18 and over, there were 85.9 males.

The median income for a household in the town was $27,614, and the median income for a family was $30,083. Males had a median income of $28,594 versus $21,932 for females. The per capita income for the town was $11,491. About 17.1% of families and 27.1% of the population were below the poverty line, including 37.1% of those under age 18 and 24.5% of those age 65 or over.

=== Religion and society ===
Utica is the location of the URJ Henry S. Jacobs Camp, organized by the Union for Reform Judaism and dating to when there were more Jews in smaller communities throughout the South. Many now live in larger urban areas with more professional opportunities.

The town is home to several churches of various denominations, including the following on Main Street: Utica Baptist Church (founded in 1829 and affiliated with the Southern Baptist Convention), Utica Christian Church (Disciples of Christ), Utica United Methodist Church, and St. Peter's Missionary Baptist Church, a black Baptist church founded after the Civil War in 1867 by freedmen. Because black Baptists withdrew en masse from white Baptist churches across the South, St. Peter's was founded as a mission of the white Baptist church in Utica. Black Baptists soon founded independent state associations of their congregations and organized a national convention by the end of the century. There are several other houses of worship in the town proper, as well as others in the county nearby.

== Education ==
Utica is served by the Hinds County School District. Students up to grade nine attend Utica Elementary-Middle School, and older students attend Raymond High School in Raymond.

It is also the home of the Utica campus of Hinds Community College. Founded in 1903 as Utica Normal and Industrial Institute, a technical school for African Americans, the institute became known as Utica Junior College. Utica was also home to the former Hinds County Agricultural High School.

Jackson/Hinds Library System operates the Evelyn Taylor Majure Library in Utica.

== Notable people ==
- Woodrow Borah, historian
- Alonzo Bradley who played for Texas Southern University; MVP of the 1977 NAIA basketball championship
- Zack Bragg, first mayor of West Memphis, Arkansas
- Charles H. Griffin, member of the U.S. House of Representatives from Mississippi's 3rd congressional district
- William Henry Holtzclaw, educator and the founder of Utica Institute which became Hinds Community College
- Lindsey Hunter, professional basketball player and coach
- Robert Moreland, former basketball coach for Texas Southern
- Sonny Boy Nelson, Delta blues musician
- Derek Newton, offensive lineman for Houston Texans
- Pete Perry, former professional basketball player
- Willie Lee Simmons, former member of the Mississippi State Senate
- Marcell Young, professional football defensive back
