= Mercy Baby =

American blues and R&B drummer (1930–1977)

Julius W. "Jimmy" Mullins (March 12, 1930 – September 10, 1977), who performed and recorded as Mercy Baby, was an American blues and rhythm and blues musician. A drummer, singer and songwriter, he recorded in the late 1950s.

He was born near Rawls Springs, Forrest County, Mississippi, the son of Jessie and Jeff Mullins, a nightwatchman. By about 1948 he was living in Dallas, Texas. He first recorded as a drummer on guitarist and singer Frankie Lee Sims' 1957 record, "What Will Lucy Do?", for Ace Records. He continued to perform as a member of Sims' band, and recorded with him until at least 1960. Using the name Mercy Baby, he released two singles, "Marked Deck" and "Silly Dilly Woman", on the Ace label in 1957, both featuring Sims on guitar, followed by a 1958 single, "Pleadin'", on the Ric label. He performed with Sims at Al Benson's rock and roll show in Chicago in November 1957, on a bill with Big Maybelle, Screamin' Jay Hawkins, The Dells and others. His final recordings, "Love's Voodoo" in 1958 and "the Rock and Stomp" in 1959, were released on his own label in Dallas.

He was married, and at the end of his life worked in property maintenance. He died in Dallas, aged 47, in the early hours of September 10, 1977, as a result of a gunshot wound to the neck received during an altercation, and was buried in Carver Memorial Park.

== Discography ==
- "Marked Deck" / "Rock n' Roll Baby" (Ace 528, 1957)
- "Silly Dilly Woman" / "Mercy's Blues" (Ace 535, 1957)
- "Pleadin'" / "Don't Lie To Me" (Ric 955, 1958)
- "Love's Voodoo" / "You Ran Away" (Mercy Baby 501, 1958)
- "The Rock and Stomp" / "So Lonesome" (Mercy Baby 502, 1959)
- "I Tried It" / "I Messed Up" (P&P 105, 1965)
