= Eatonville =

Eatonville may refer to:

- Eatonville, Florida, United States
- Eatonville, Minnesota, United States, an alternative name for the former Dakota village Ḣeyate Otuŋwe
- Eatonville, Mississippi, United States
- Eatonville, Ontario, a neighbourhood of the city of Toronto, Canada
- Eatonville, Nova Scotia, Canada, a ghost town
- Eatonville, Washington, United States
