= HSJ =

HSJ may refer to:

- Hey! Say! JUMP, a Japanese all-male band
- Health Service Journal, a British news service
- Henry S. Jacobs Camp, the Jewish summer camp in the United States
- Hindu Janajagruti Samiti, an Indian religious organization
