= Derek Newton =

American football player (born 1987)

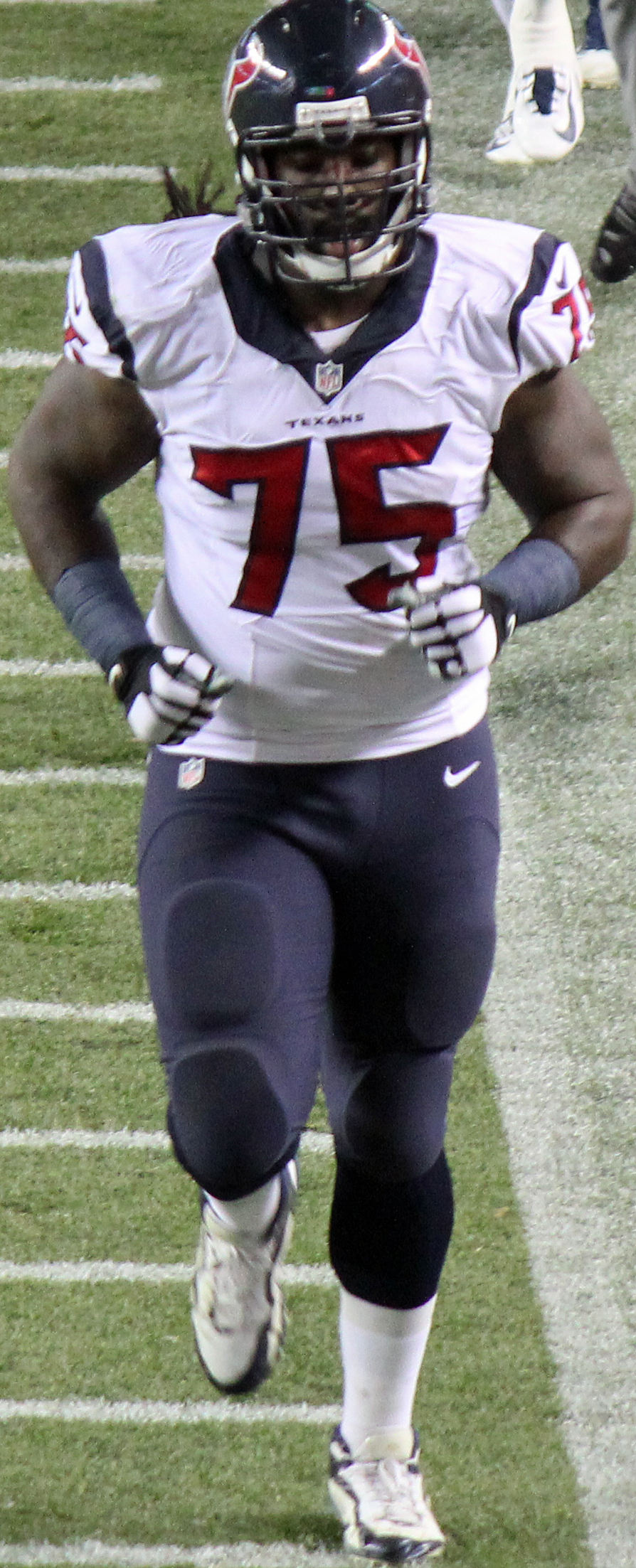
- Newton with the Houston Texans in 2014

No. 75, 72, 77
- Position: Offensive tackle

Personal information
- Born: November 16, 1987 (age 39); Utica, Mississippi, U.S.
- Listed height: 6 ft 6 in (1.98 m)
- Listed weight: 315 lb (143 kg)

Career information
- High school: Hinds County Agricultural (Utica)
- College: Arkansas State
- NFL draft: 2011: 7th round, 214th overall pick

Career history
- Houston Texans (2011–2017); New Orleans Saints (2018)

Awards and highlights
- First-team All-Sun Belt (2010); Second-team All-Sun Belt (2009)

Career NFL statistics
- Games played: 83
- Games started: 68
- Stats at Pro Football Reference

Derek Newton (born November 16, 1987) is an American former professional football player who was an offensive tackle in the National Football League (NFL). He was selected by the Houston Texans in the seventh round of the 2011 NFL draft and played for the team until knee injuries halted his career in 2016. He also played for the New Orleans Saints. He played college football for the Arkansas State Red Wolves, and Hinds Community College before that.

== Early life ==
A native of Utica, Mississippi, Newton attended Hinds County Agricultural High School, where he was an All-Metro and All-District lineman as a senior, after playing only two years of high school football. He helped the team to a 10–0 regular-season record during senior season. However, Newton went unregarded by national recruiting services like Rivals.com and Scout.com. Despite drawing some interest from North Texas and Troy, he decided to attend Hinds Community College in Raymond, Mississippi (2006–2007).

== College career ==
A two-star recruit coming out of junior college, Newton went on to Arkansas State, where he redshirted in 2008. He became a starter in 2009, earning Second-team All-Sun Belt Conference honors. In 2010, he earned First-team honors.

== Professional career ==
Pre-draft measurables
Height	Weight	Arm length	Hand span	Wingspan	40-yard dash	10-yard split	20-yard split	20-yard shuttle	Three-cone drill	Vertical jump	Broad jump	Bench press
6 ft 4 7/8 in (1.95 m)	311 lb (141 kg)	33 1/8 in (0.84 m)	9 3/8 in (0.24 m)	6 ft 6 1/8 in (1.98 m)	5.01 s	1.74 s	2.90 s	5.00 s	7.76 s	25.5 in (0.65 m)	8 ft 4 in (2.54 m)	24 reps
All values from 2011 NFL Combine

=== Houston Texans ===
Projected as a fifth-round selection, Newton was ranked as the No. 16 offensive tackle available in the 2011 NFL draft. Sports Illustrated described him as "a solid athlete and a terrific developmental prospect who could eventually break into a starting lineup". Newton was eventually selected in the seventh round with the 214th overall pick by the Houston Texans. He was the first offensive lineman to be drafted out of Arkansas State since Ray Brown in 1986.

During his rookie season, Newton appeared in 14 games as a backup to veteran right tackle Eric Winston. After Winston was cut following the 2011 NFL season, Newton competed with veteran Rashad Butler for the starting right tackle spot, eventually winning out.

After starting every game of the 2012 season, Newton injured his right knee during the Texans' win over the Detroit Lions on November 22. He was replaced in the starting line-up by Ryan Harris.

On March 7, 2015, Newton re-signed with the Texans to a five-year, $26.5 million contract.

On October 24, 2016, Newton went down with an injury in a Week 7 game against the Denver Broncos and was carted off the field with air casts attached to both legs. It was eventually revealed that both patellar tendons were torn, effectively ending his 2016 season.

On May 12, 2017, Newton was placed on Reserve/PUP as a result of his knee injuries suffered in 2016.

On April 12, 2018, the Texans released Newton.

=== New Orleans Saints ===
On December 11, 2018, Newton signed a two-year contract with the New Orleans Saints, two years after his devastating knee injuries. He was released on December 20, 2018, but was re-signed a week later. On May 22, 2019, Newton was released by the Saints.
