= Coahoma Early College High School =

Public school in Mississippi, US

Coahoma Early College High School (Aggie)

Location
- 3240 Friars Point Road; Clarksdale address, MS 38614; United States; 34.2560689°N 90.5712512°W

Information
- Type: Public, Secondary
- School district: Coahoma AHS District
- Grades: 7–12
- Enrollment: 552 (2023-2024)
- Colors: Maroon and White
- Mascot: Tigers
- Website: http://cahs.k12.ms.us/

Coahoma Early College High School (CECHS), formerly Coahoma Agricultural High School (CAHS), was a public secondary school in unincorporated Coahoma County, Mississippi (United States), with a Clarksdale postal address. The school was designated as a part of the Coahoma Agricultural High School District (ASD #1402), and operated by Coahoma Community College. Previously it was, as of 2000, one of three independently functioning agricultural high schools in the state of Mississippi. The school had its own facilities, instructional and administrative personnel, and student programs. It shared library facilities with the college.

When it was still CAHS, the school operated the Coahoma Early College High School program. On July 1, 2018, the original Coahoma County Agricultural High School was dissolved, with the Coahoma Early College High School taking its place.

Coahoma Early College High School closed in 2021.

== History ==
Coahoma County Agricultural High School was established in 1924. It was one of the first agricultural high schools for Blacks in Mississippi. A junior college curriculum was added in 1949 and the institution's name was changed to Coahoma Junior College and Agricultural High School. The school was desegregated in 1965, although the student body has remained mostly African American.

Coahoma Junior College was removed from the title of Coahoma County Agricultural High School in 1975 and in 1981, the school began operating separately from the Coahoma County School District and dropped the word "county" from its name.

A 2012 report by Augenblick, Palaich and Associates suggested changing the school's focus to an early college school and/or merging it. It stated that the school's academic performance was below the state average and that the school no longer had a focus on agriculture.

On July 1, 2018, the original Coahoma County Agricultural High School was dissolved, with the Coahoma Early College High School taking its place. Governor of Mississippi Phil Bryant signed into law Senate Bill 2501, which required this change in the school, in May 2016.

In 2021, the Mississippi Department of Education stated that funding to the school would cease. On July 22 of that year, the courts dismissed a lawsuit aiming to continue the funding. This closure ended the dual track classes.

== Demographics ==
A majority of the Coahoma AHS student body came from the towns of Friars Point, Coahoma, Lula, and Jonestown – all part of the Coahoma County School District. A limited number of students from the Clarksdale Municipal School District opted to attend Coahoma AHS instead of Clarksdale High School.

In the 2014–15 school year, the school enrolled 267 black students, 1 Hispanic, and no white students.

== Structure ==
The president of Coahoma Community College also serves as superintendent of the Coahoma Agricultural High School. The same board of trustees governs both the high school and community college.

In addition to the superintendent and board of trustees, Coahoma AHS had the same administrative personnel common in other public high schools, including a principal and assistant principal.

== Leadership ==
=== Superintendents ===
Term	Incumbent
1924–1925	M. L. Strange
1925–1929	J. M. Mosley
1929–1937	J. W. Addison
1937–1945	J. B. Wright
1945–1966	B. F. McLaurin
1966–1979	J. E. Miller
1980–1992	McKinley C. Martin
1992–2013	Vivian Presley
2013–2021	Valmadge T. Towner

=== Principals ===
Term	Incumbent
1951–1954	James E. Miller
1954–1963	W. L. Tobias
1963–1974	Frank McCune
1974–1984	Eugene Fox
1984–1985	Albert Williams
1985–1986	Sammy Fellton
1986–1987	T. W. Richardson
1987–1993	S. T. Bailey
1993–1996	Olenza McBride
1996–2007	John Brown
2007–2013	I. D. Thompson
2014–2015	Braxton Stowe
2015–2018	Milton Hardrict
2018–2021	Cloretha Jamison

== Demographics ==
=== 2006–07 school year ===
There was a total of 291 students enrolled at Coahoma Agricultural High School during the 2006–2007 school year. The gender makeup of the school was 53% female and 47% male. The racial makeup of the school was 100.00% African American. 93.5% of the school's students were eligible to receive free lunch.

=== Previous school years ===
School Year	Enrollment	Gender Makeup		Racial Makeup				
School Year	Enrollment	Female	Male	Asian	African American	Hispanic	Native American	White
2005–06	305	53%	47%	–	100.00%	–	–	–
2004–05	313	53%	47%	–	100.00%	–	–	–
2003–04	297	55%	45%	–	100.00%	–	–	–
2002–03	298	55%	45%	–	100.00%	–	–	–

== Accountability statistics ==
	2006–07	2005–06	2004–05	2003–04	2002–03
District Accreditation Status	Accredited	Accredited	Accredited	Accredited	Accredited
School Performance Classifications
Level 5 (Superior Performing)					
Level 4 (Exemplary)					
Level 3 (Successful)			X	X	X
Level 2 (Under Performing)	X	X			
Level 1 (Low Performing)					

== Notable alumni ==
- Aaron Henry, civil rights leader

== See also ==
- Forrest County Agricultural High School - The sole remaining independently functioning agricultural high school in Mississippi
- Hinds County Agricultural High School - One of three remaining independent agricultural high schools in the state until its 2014 closure
- List of high schools in Mississippi
- List of school districts in Mississippi
