= Riverside, Forrest County, Mississippi =

Riverside, Mississippi
- Ghost town
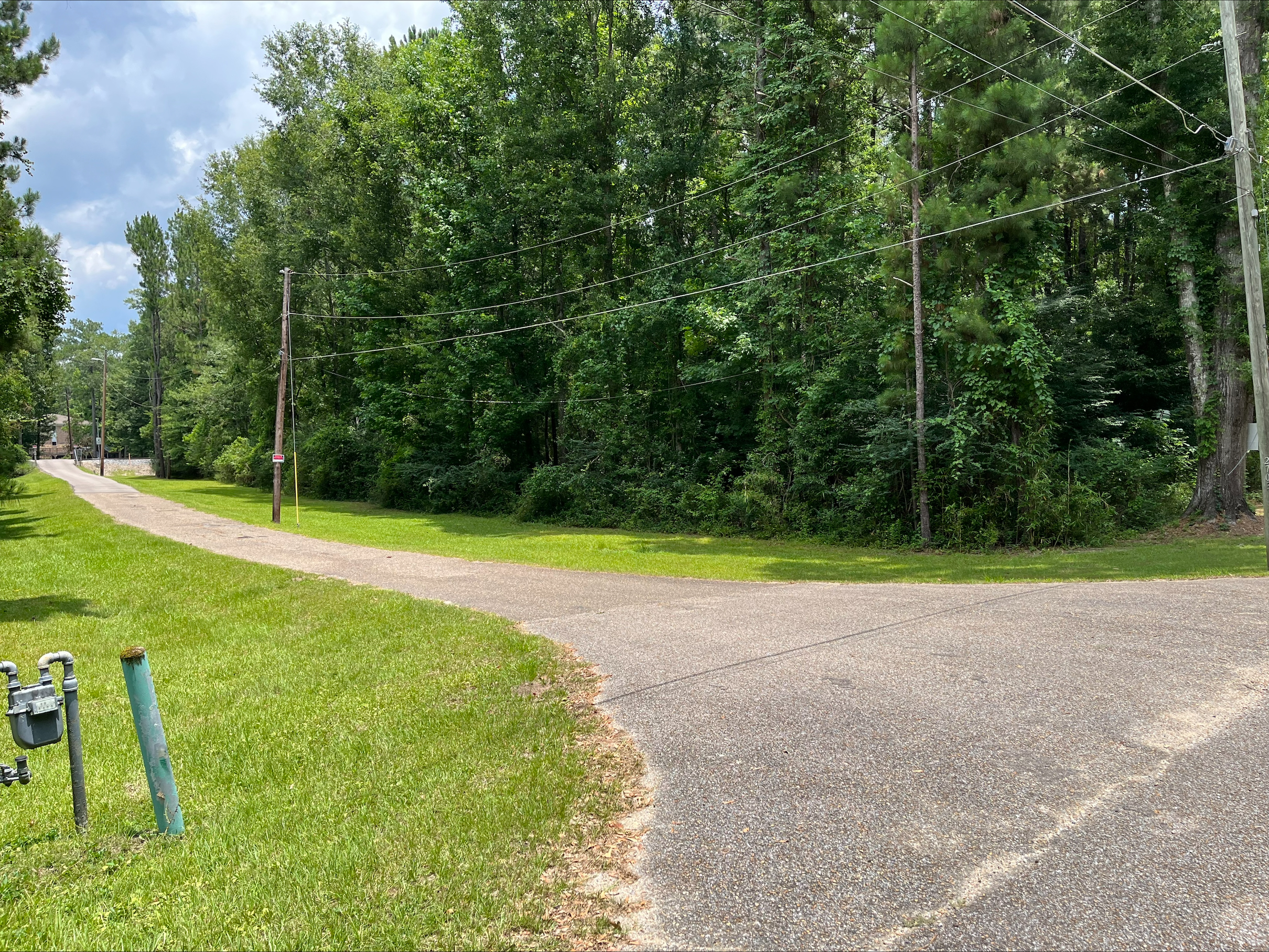
- Site of the former community of Riverside

- Location within Mississippi
- Coordinates: 31°21′15″N 89°19′54″W
- Country: United States
- State: Mississippi
- County: Forrest
- Elevation: 151 ft (46 m)
- Time zone: UTC-6 (Central (CST))
  - Summer (DST): UTC-5 (CDT)
- GNIS feature ID: 692178

Riverside (also known as Lakeview) is a ghost town located in Forrest County, Mississippi, United States.

Riverside was named for its location on the south side of the Bouie River.

A large store once operated in the settlement.
