= Wallis, Mississippi =

- Unincorporated community
- Location within Mississippi Location within the United States
- Coordinates: 31°09′20″N 89°14′18″W
- Country: United States
- State: Mississippi
- County: Forrest
- Elevation: 236 ft (72 m)
- Time zone: UTC-6 (Central (CST))
  - Summer (DST): UTC-5 (CDT)
- Area codes: 601 & 769
- GNIS feature ID: 695088

Wallis (also Walls) is an unincorporated community in Forrest County, Mississippi, United States.
