= Clarence V. Monin =

American union leader

- Born: October 11, 1940; Louisville, Kentucky, United States
- Died: June 26, 2025 (aged 84); Louisville, Kentucky, United States
- Occupation(s): Railway engineer, labor leader
- Known for: President of the Brotherhood of Locomotive Engineers

Clarence V. Monin (October 11, 1940 – June 26, 2025) was President of the Brotherhood of Locomotive Engineers (BLE), a railway workers' union in the United States.

== Early years ==
Clarence V. Monin was born around 1941 in Louisville, Kentucky. He became a trainman on the Louisville and Nashville Railroad (L&N) in 1964. He was promoted to L&N locomotive engineer in 1966, and joined the BLE that year.

In 1977 Monin became Senior Vice-General Chairman and in 1978 General Chairman of the BLE General Committee of Adjustment for the L&N, holding office until 1985. He was BLE International Vice President from 1985 to 1991. In 1991 Monin was elected First Vice President & Alternate President, the second position in the union's leadership. In this role he was U.S. national chairman of the BLE Safety Task Force, where he helped the National Transportation Safety Board investigate major train accidents. He was also vice-chairman of the BLE U.S. National Legislative Board and director of the BLE Education & Training Department.

== Union head ==
Monin was elected International President of the 55,000-member BLE in July 1996, at the age of 55. He replaced Ronald P. McLaughlin, who had led the union from 1991. The same year Monin was elected Vice Chairman of the Railway Labor Executives Association. He also became a member of the Executive Committee of the Transportation Trades Department of the AFL–CIO. Edward Dubroski became the first vice president of the Brotherhood of Locomotive Engineers when Monin was elected president.

On 17 September 1998 President Bill Clinton named Monin a member of the Amtrak Reform Council. The council would evaluate the performance of the Amtrak Reform Board and make recommendations for further improvements to productivity and the financial health of Amtrak. Monin was involved in negotiations to merge the BLE with the United Transportation Union, which represented switchmen, brakemen, and conductors and some engineers. In November 1998 the leaders of the two unions agreed to a merger in principle.

== Recall ==
Under Monin's leadership the union was reportedly in financial difficulties. A move to recall Monin began in May 1999, initiated by Division 782 in Tennessee. Reasons included alleged financial mismanagement and failure to inform members about the UTU negotiations. In August 1999 Monin left office after losing a recall vote by a narrow margin. In a separate ballot Dubroski was elected to succeed Monin as head of the 55,000-member union by about 80% of the vote.
