= Edward W. Rodzwicz =

- Born: c. 1946; Pittsburgh, Pennsylvania.
- Occupations: Railway engineer, labor leader
- Known for: President of the Brotherhood of Locomotive Engineers and Trainmen

Edward W. Rodzwicz (born c. 1946) was President of the Brotherhood of Locomotive Engineers and Trainmen (BLET), a railway workers' union in the United States.

== Career ==
Edward Rodzwicz is from Pittsburgh, Pennsylvania. He joined the BLE in 1977 and became a Special Representative for the union in 1988. He served in various positions on the Conrail General Committee of Adjustment. In 1991 he was elected Alternate Vice-President, and in 1996 he was elected International Vice-President. In September 2001 he was elected First Vice-President & Alternate President, the second position in the union's leadership.

In September 2007 a Teamsters oversight board accused the president of the union, Don Hahs, of embezzling $58,000 of union funds. Hahs was suspended for a year. Rodzwicz replaced him as President. In October 2009 Rodzwicz was arrested on two charges of bribery. It was alleged that he and another official had accepted cash payments from a Texan personal injury attorney in return for listing the attorney as a Designated Legal Counsel, which would make BLET members more likely to use the attorney's services. Rodzwicz resigned on 13 November 2009. He was then replaced by Paul Sorrow. Rodzwicz pleaded guilty on two charges. In September 2010, at the age of 64, he was sentenced to 18 months in a federal prison.
