= Zack Bragg =

American politician

Mayor of West Memphis
- In office 1927–1930
- Preceded by: Office Established
- Succeeded by: Marshall B. Currie Sr.

Zack T. Bragg (October 16, 1888 – July 24, 1967) was a co-founder and first mayor of the city of West Memphis, Arkansas.

Being one of the first settlers of the area, moving from Utica, Mississippi, to Crittenden County, Arkansas, in 1905. He began to clear land, and in 1914, he established Bragg's lumber mill, which operated in West Memphis for several decades.

When the city of West Memphis received the right to incorporate in 1927, local citizens favored the name "Bragg City", which was already an informal name for the area. Bragg, who wanted to further his lumber business, preferred the name West Memphis because of nearby Memphis, Tennessee's prestige within the lumber community at the time.

After he left office, Bragg led opposition to night clubs. A March 20, 1930, Associated Press story described Bragg as a "militant crusader" against the re-opening of a showboat club and quoted him as saying if it re-opened, "We will raid the place, arrest the owners, employers and all the patrons, including women, with liquor bottles under their tables."

Bragg sold his mill to the Dacus family during the Great Depression and later operated a garage and car dealership.

On July 23, 1967, Bragg died in a hospital in Memphis at age 76.
