= Maybank, Mississippi =

- Unincorporated community
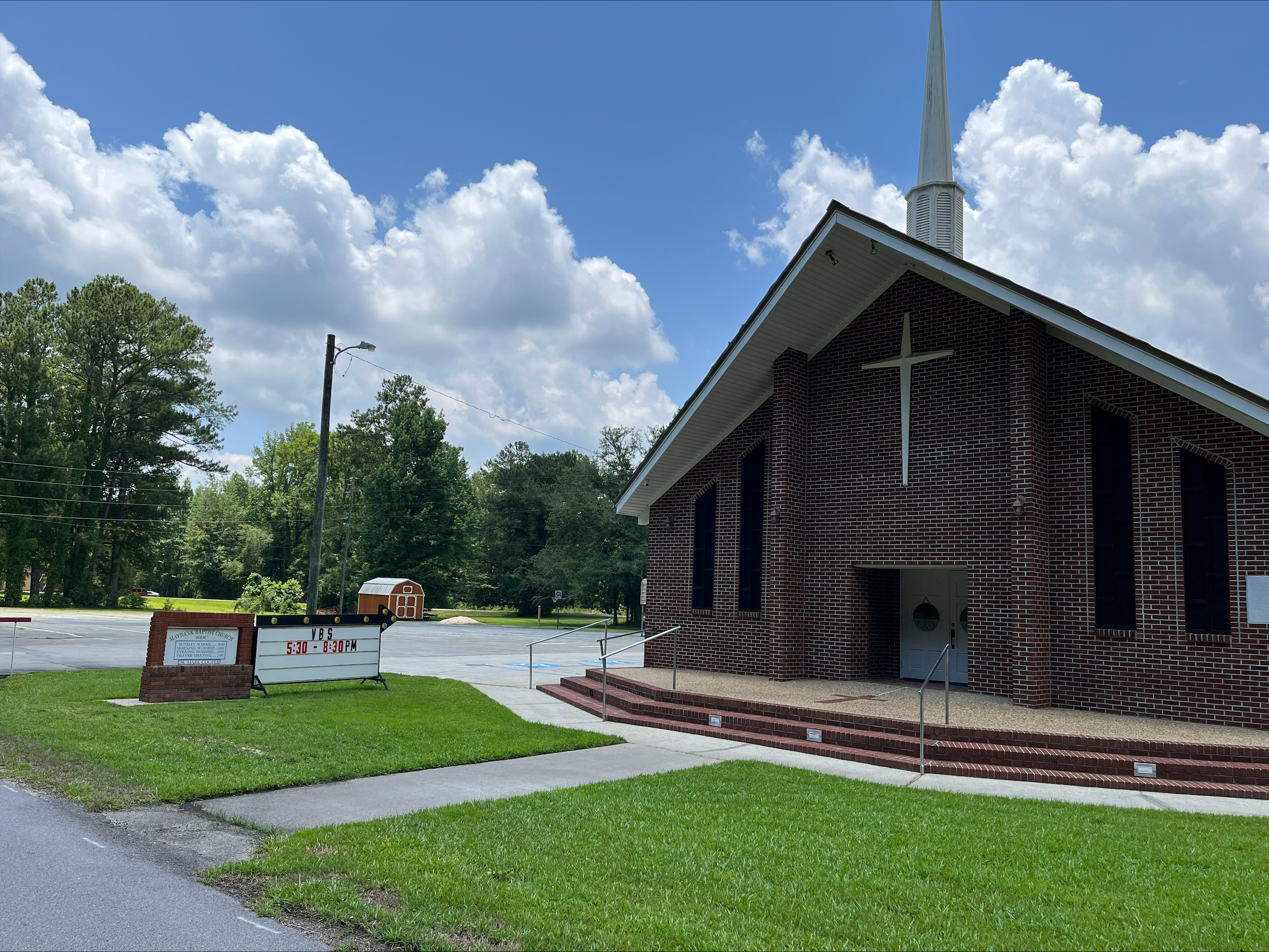
- Maybank Baptist Church

- Location within Mississippi Location within the United States
- Coordinates: 31°24′28″N 89°22′11″W
- Country: United States
- State: Mississippi
- County: Forrest
- Elevation: 174 ft (53 m)
- Time zone: UTC-6 (Central (CST))
  - Summer (DST): UTC-5 (CDT)
- Area code: 662
- GNIS feature ID: 692052

Maybank is a small unincorporated community in northern Forrest County, Mississippi.

== History ==
Maybank is located on the former Gulf and Ship Island Railroad. The community was named for an early citizen.

The Greenwood Sawmill Company formerly operated a lumber mill in Maybank.
