= Harold Ray Watson =

American missionary and agronomist

- Born: April 17, 1934 (age 91); Brooklyn, Mississippi
- Occupation: Agronomist
- Known for: Sloping Agricultural Land Technology, Ramon Magsaysay Award recipient

Harold Ray Watson (born April 17, 1934) is a retired missionary and pioneer in the field of agronomy. He is world recognized for developing a method of cultivating denuded mountain slopes, and for encouraging utilization of the method to help the poorest, small scale, tropical farmers, specifically in the Philippines. He was awarded the Ramon Magsaysay Award in 1985.

== Early life ==
Watson was born on a farm 14 miles (23 km) from Hattiesburg, Mississippi, the second child and only son of Joseph Watson and Dorothy Mae Cagle. His father farmed cotton, corn and watermelon on 150 acres (61 hectares) of sloping hillside land. His parents separated and his father worked at a government arsenal in Texas and later remarried, but his mother and the two children remained in Mississippi on the family farm.

Watson studied at McLaurin Elementary School and Forrest County Agricultural High School, graduating in 1952. He then served in the United States Air Force from 1952 to 1956. Following his discharge, he married his wife, Joyce, then attended Hinds Junior College in Raymond, Mississippi, for one year, before transferring to Mississippi State University to gain an undergraduate degree in agriculture. He received his Bachelor of Science degree in 1959, and Master of Science degree in 1960.

== Calling to Missionary work ==
The idea of becoming a missionary came to Watson whilst on active duty during the Korean War. After graduating university in 1960, he spent a year at the Southwestern Baptist Theological Seminary in Fort Worth, Texas, and a further year teaching vocational agriculture at North Forrest High School in Eatonville, Mississippi, before applying for missionary work. He received an appointment as agricultural evangelist to the Philippines in May 1964.

From 1965 to 1970, Watson served at Southern Baptist College in M'Lang, Cotabato, on the island of Mindanao, as an agricultural consultant, and also worked with rural farmers and churches in the area. In 1971, Watson opened the Mindanao Baptist Rural Life Center, a training center for farmers, which integrates agricultural development with Bible teaching. He served as director for the center until his retirement in 1997.

Watson returned to the United States in November 1997, for final furlough until officially retiring on January 31, 1999. He presently resides in Terry, Mississippi.

== SALT ==
Observing that the steep slopes of the region made traditional farming impossible, Watson established a 50 acres (20 hectares) site, on abandoned mountain farmland, to develop a system that would allow the Filipinos to better feed themselves. Over many years he was able to develop a method, called Sloping Agricultural Land Technology (SALT), that enabled farmers to produce food on badly eroded hillsides.

SALT has been adopted by a variety of countries (Note: Including Indonesia, Sri Lanka, Burma and many other Asian countries.) and relief organisation to battle hunger. In 1998, he established the Asian Rural Life Development Foundation for the purpose of extending awareness of farming technologies, suitable for poor upland farmers, to other countries in Asia.

== Honors ==
- Achievement Award in Technology Development from the Crop Science Society of the Philippines (1984)
- Ramon Magsaysay Award in International Understanding for encouraging international utilization of the SALT technology, created by him and his co-workers, to help the poorest tropical farmers (1985)
- Outstanding Farm Technology Award from the Department of Science and Technology of the Philippine Government. The citation from President Corazon Aquino, for his work with poor upland farmers in the Philippines, was presented in Washington, D.C. during her visit to the United States.(1985)
- World Food Day Award presented by Food and Agriculture Organization (FAO) of the United Nations for his efforts in promoting awareness of the dangers in unlimited exploitation of the world's forests, and for the development and promulgation of technologies promoting the use of trees to conserve the soil and minimize soil erosion on steep hillsides.
- Mississippi Legislature recognition (1999).

== Quotes ==
Soil erosion is an enemy to any nation - far worse than any outside enemy coming into a country and conquering it, because it is an enemy you cannot see vividly. It's a slow creeping enemy that soon possesses the land.

== Dissertation ==
- Watson, H. R. (1960). A Study of Agricultural Education in Foreign Lands Sponsored by Various Religious Mission Boards. M.S. Mississippi State University, Department of Agricultural Education.
