= Rawls Springs, Mississippi =

- Census-designated place
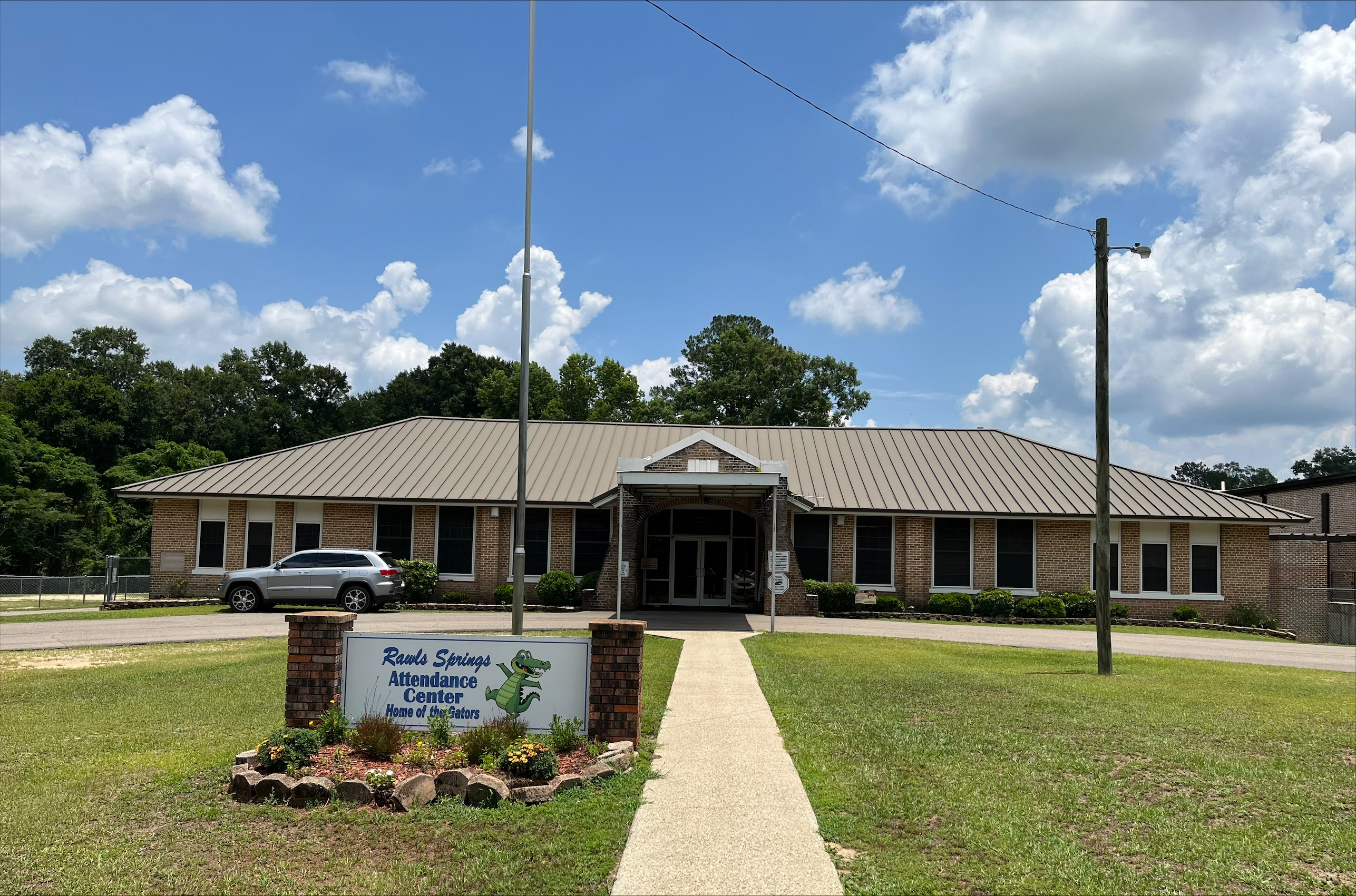
- Rawls Springs Attendance Center

- Location within Mississippi
- Coordinates: 31°22′51″N 89°22′17″W
- Country: United States
- State: Mississippi
- County: Forrest

Area
  - Total: 1.84 sq mi (4.76 km^{2})
  - Land: 1.83 sq mi (4.73 km^{2})
  - Water: 0.012 sq mi (0.03 km^{2})
- Elevation: 174 ft (53 m)

Population (2020)
  - Total: 1,202
  - Density: 658.4/sq mi (254.21/km^{2})
- Time zone: UTC-6 (Central (CST))
  - Summer (DST): UTC-5 (CDT)
- ZIP code: 39402
- Area code: 601
- GNIS feature ID: 676496

Rawls Springs is an unincorporated community and census-designated place (CDP) located in Forrest County, Mississippi, United States. As of the 2020 census it had a population of 1,202. Rawls Springs is approximately 6.5 miles (10.5 km) northwest of Hattiesburg near U.S. Route 49 and a part of the Hattiesburg, Mississippi Metropolitan Statistical Area.

Rawls Springs is located on the former Illinois Central Gulf Railroad.

A post office operated under the name Rawles Springs from 1905 to 1927.

== Demographics ==
Historical population
Census	Pop.	Note	%±
2020	1,202		—
U.S. Decennial Census

Rawls Springs first appeared as a census designated place in the 2010 U.S. census.

Rawls Springs racial composition as of 2020 (NH = Non-Hispanic) (Note: Note: the US Census treats Hispanic/Latino as an ethnic category. This table excludes Latinos from the racial categories and assigns them to a separate category. Hispanics/Latinos can be of any race.)
Race	Number	Percentage
White (NH)	370	30.78%
Black or African American (NH)	749	62.31%
Native American or Alaska Native (NH)	1	0.08%
Asian (NH)	3	0.25%
Pacific Islander (NH)	1	0.08%
Some Other Race (NH)	2	0.17%
Mixed/Multi-Racial (NH)	21	1.75%
Hispanic or Latino	55	4.58%
Total	1,202	

As of the 2020 United States census, there were 1,202 people, 686 households, and 505 families residing in the CDP.

== Notable person ==
- Mercy Baby, blues musician

== Schooling ==
Rawls Springs is home to the Rawls Springs Attendance Center, a kindergarten through sixth-grade school serving approximately 225 students, with 19 certified staff members and 9 support staff.
