= Ronald P. McLaughlin =

American labor leader (1929–2021)

- Born: November 13, 1929; Kansas City, Missouri, U.S.
- Died: November 12, 2021 (aged 91); Surprise, Arizona, U.S.
- Occupations: Railway engineer, labor leader
- Known for: President of the Brotherhood of Locomotive Engineers

Ronald Paul McLaughlin (November 13, 1929 – November 12, 2021) was an American railway engineer and labor leader who was the President of the Brotherhood of Locomotive Engineers (BLE), a railway workers' union in the United States, from 1991 to 1996.

== Early years ==
Ronald Paul McLaughlin was born on 13 November 1929 in Kansas City, Missouri. His father, J.H. McLaughlin, was a BLE official who served as chairman of the BLE General Committee of Adjustment on the Milwaukee Road from 1951 to 1966.

Ronald P. McLaughlin served in the United States Marine Corps. In 1948 he became a fireman on the Chicago, Milwaukee, St. Paul and Pacific Railroad. For ten years he played semi-pro baseball in his spare time. He was elected chairman of his BLE local division in Kansas City in 1960. McLaughlin was also local chairman of his BLE division in Ottumwa, Iowa, from 1969 to 1981, as well as secretary-treasurer and legislative representative of the division. He became vice-chairman of the BLE General Committee of Adjustment on the Milwaukee Road in 1971, and general chairman in 1981.

== Union leader ==
McLaughlin was elected first vice-president of the BLE, and then in 1991 was elected International President. He defeated the incumbent president Larry McFather.

Under his leadership the union grew in size, despite declining numbers of railroad workers. In 1992, McLaughlin was elected vice-chairman of the Railway Labor Executives' Association (RLEA). In April 1993 he was elected chairman of the RLEA by acclamation, succeeding Edward P. McEntee.

McLaughlin left office in 1996. Clarence V. Monin was elected International President of the 55,000-member BLE in July 1996.

== Death ==
McLaughlin died in Surprise, Arizona on November 12, 2021, one day before his 92nd birthday.
