= Forrest County, Mississippi =

County in Mississippi, United States

- County
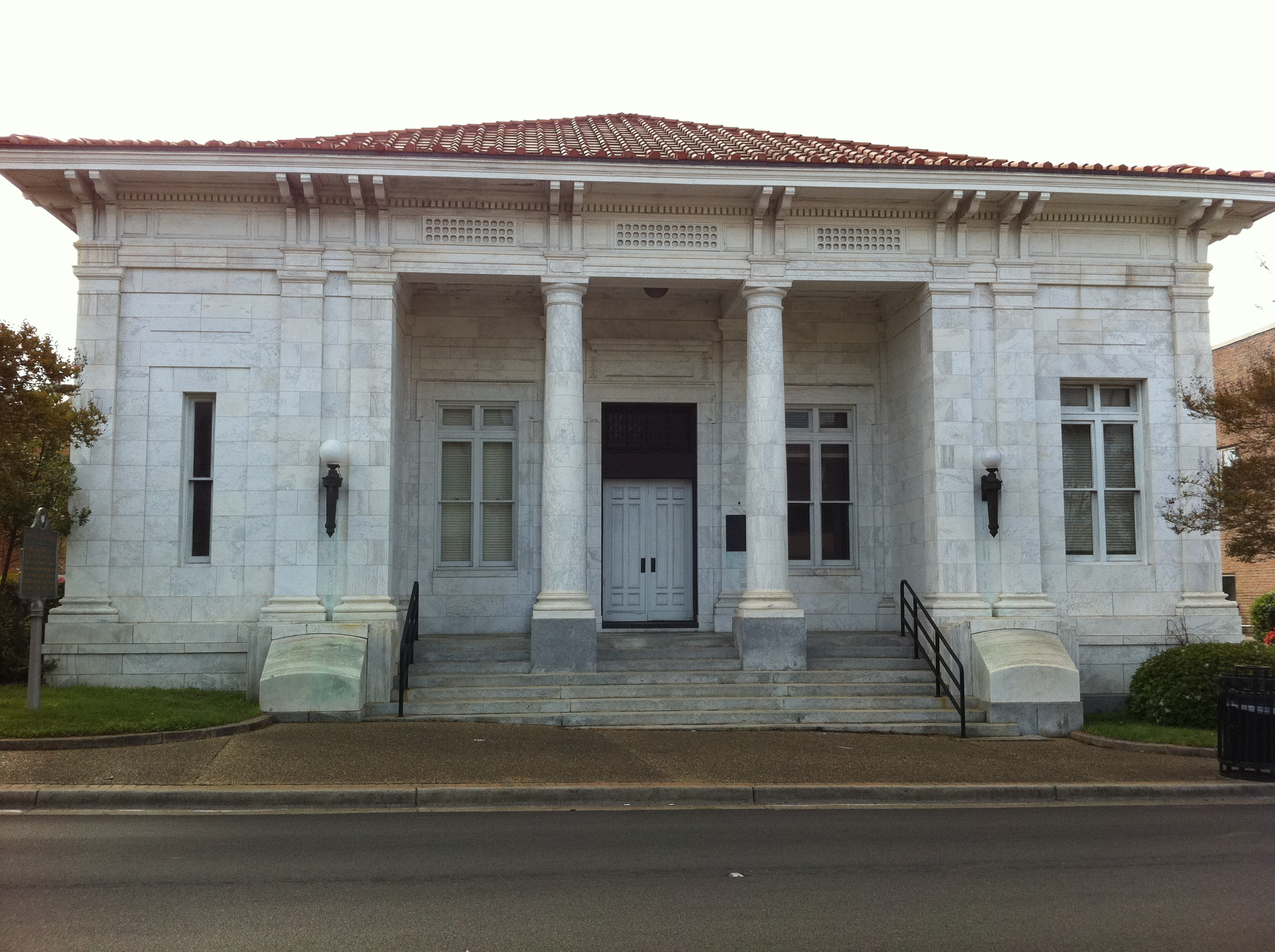
- Hattiesburg Municipal Court.

- Location within the U.S. state of Mississippi
- Coordinates: 31°11′N 89°16′W
- Country: United States
- State: Mississippi
- Founded: 1908
- Named for: Nathan B. Forrest
- Seat: Hattiesburg
- Largest city: Hattiesburg

Area
  - Total: 470 sq mi (1,220 km^{2})
  - Land: 466 sq mi (1,210 km^{2})
  - Water: 3.9 sq mi (10 km^{2}) 0.8%

Population (2020)
  - Total: 78,158
  - Estimate (2025): 79,034 ▲
  - Density: 166/sq mi (64.1/km^{2})
- Time zone: UTC−6 (Central)
  - Summer (DST): UTC−5 (CDT)
- Congressional district: 4th
- Website: forrestcountyms.us

Forrest County is a county located in the U.S. state of Mississippi. As of the 2020 census, the population was 78,158. Its county seat and largest city is Hattiesburg. The county was created from Perry County in 1908 and named in honor of Nathan Bedford Forrest, a Confederate general in the American Civil War and the first Grand Wizard of the Ku Klux Klan. Forrest County is part of the Hattiesburg, MS Metropolitan Statistical Area.

== Geography ==
According to the U.S. Census Bureau, the county has a total area of 470 square miles (1,200 km^{2}), of which 466 square miles (1,210 km^{2}) is land and 3.9 square miles (10 km^{2}) (0.8%) is water.

=== Major highways ===
- Interstate 59
- U.S. Highway 11
- U.S. Highway 49
- U.S. Highway 98
- Mississippi Highway 13
- Mississippi Highway 42

=== Adjacent counties ===
- Jones County (northeast)
- Perry County (east)
- Stone County (south)
- Pearl River County (southwest)
- Lamar County (west)
- Covington County (northwest)

=== National protected area ===
- De Soto National Forest (part)

== Demographics ==
Historical population
Census	Pop.	Note	%±
1910	20,722		—
1920	21,238		2.5%
1930	30,115		41.8%
1940	34,901		15.9%
1950	45,055		29.1%
1960	52,722		17.0%
1970	57,849		9.7%
1980	66,018		14.1%
1990	68,314		3.5%
2000	72,604		6.3%
2010	74,934		3.2%
2020	78,158		4.3%
2025 (est.)	79,034	▲	1.1%
U.S. Decennial Census; 1790-1960 1900-1990; 1990-2000 2010-2013

=== Racial and ethnic composition ===
Forrest County, Mississippi – Racial and ethnic composition Note: the US Census treats Hispanic/Latino as an ethnic category. This table excludes Latinos from the racial categories and assigns them to a separate category. Hispanics/Latinos may be of any race.
Race / Ethnicity (NH = Non-Hispanic)	Pop 1980	Pop 1990	Pop 2000	Pop 2010	Pop 2020	% 1980	% 1990	% 2000	% 2010	% 2020
White alone (NH)	47,318	46,315	46,225	43,766	43,121	71.67%	67.80%	63.67%	58.41%	55.17%
Black or African American alone (NH)	17,544	20,947	24,225	26,956	28,151	26.57%	30.66%	33.37%	35.97%	36.02%
Native American or Alaska Native alone (NH)	56	89	131	152	177	0.08%	0.13%	0.18%	0.20%	0.23%
Asian alone (NH)	267	451	535	494	789	0.40%	0.66%	0.74%	0.66%	1.01%
Native Hawaiian or Pacific Islander alone (NH)	x	x	13	33	29	x	x	0.02%	0.04%	0.04%
Other race alone (NH)	86	13	75	74	311	0.13%	0.02%	0.10%	0.10%	0.40%
Mixed race or Multiracial (NH)	x	x	488	822	2,322	x	x	0.67%	1.10%	2.97%
Hispanic or Latino (any race)	747	499	912	2,637	3,258	1.13%	0.73%	1.26%	3.52%	4.17%
Total	66,018	68,314	72,604	74,934	78,158	100.00%	100.00%	100.00%	100.00%	100.00%

=== 2020 census ===
As of the 2020 census, the county had a population of 78,158. The median age was 33.4 years. 21.7% of residents were under the age of 18 and 14.7% of residents were 65 years of age or older. For every 100 females there were 90.7 males, and for every 100 females age 18 and over there were 86.8 males age 18 and over.

The racial makeup of the county was 55.8% White, 36.2% Black or African American, 0.3% American Indian and Alaska Native, 1.0% Asian, <0.1% Native Hawaiian and Pacific Islander, 2.7% from some other race, and 3.9% from two or more races. Hispanic or Latino residents of any race comprised 4.2% of the population.

65.4% of residents lived in urban areas, while 34.6% lived in rural areas.

There were 29,997 households in the county, of which 30.5% had children under the age of 18 living in them. Of all households, 36.9% were married-couple households, 21.4% were households with a male householder and no spouse or partner present, and 34.6% were households with a female householder and no spouse or partner present. About 31.4% of all households were made up of individuals and 10.7% had someone living alone who was 65 years of age or older.

There were 33,490 housing units, of which 10.4% were vacant. Among occupied housing units, 55.9% were owner-occupied and 44.1% were renter-occupied. The homeowner vacancy rate was 1.7% and the rental vacancy rate was 8.6%.

== Communities ==
=== Cities ===
- Hattiesburg (county seat; small portion in Lamar County)
- Petal

=== Census-designated places ===
- Eastabuchie (located mostly in Jones County)
- Glendale
- Rawls Springs

=== Other unincorporated communities ===
- Brooklyn
- Carnes
- Dixie
- Eatonville
- Fruitland Park
- Maxie
- Maybank
- McLaurin
- Wallis

=== Ghost towns ===
- Riverside

== Politics ==
Forrest County has not supported the Democratic ticket for president since 1944, when it voted overwhelmingly for Franklin Roosevelt in his landslide record fourth term victory. That is the longest such streak of any county in the state. Only twice since then has it not voted Republican, in 1948 when it backed the States Rights ticket of Strom Thurmond and then-Mississippi Governor Fielding Wright, and in 1968 when it voted for George Wallace and Curtis LeMay.

Despite this streak at the presidential level, the county has become more Democratic relative to the state in recent years. Democrat Jim Hood only lost the county by a few hundred votes in the 2019 Mississippi gubernatorial election, and Brandon Presley narrowly won it by a few hundred in the 2023 election. With almost all votes counted, Scott Colom won the county by a 10% margin in the 2026 United States Senate election in Mississippi.

United States presidential election results for Forrest County, Mississippi
Year	Republican		Democratic		Third party(ies)	
Year	No.	%	No.	%	No.	%
1912	16	1.49%	886	82.57%	171	15.94%
1916	54	4.28%	1,146	90.81%	62	4.91%
1920	140	10.36%	1,146	84.76%	66	4.88%
1924	156	7.31%	1,826	85.57%	152	7.12%
1928	1,447	44.66%	1,793	55.34%	0	0.00%
1932	182	7.98%	2,068	90.70%	30	1.32%
1936	234	6.09%	3,596	93.62%	11	0.29%
1940	228	6.88%	3,075	92.82%	10	0.30%
1944	436	10.67%	3,649	89.33%	0	0.00%
1948	167	2.84%	406	6.90%	5,307	90.26%
1952	4,480	60.41%	2,936	39.59%	0	0.00%
1956	2,256	37.52%	1,928	32.06%	1,829	30.42%
1960	3,412	39.53%	2,068	23.96%	3,152	36.52%
1964	9,291	89.17%	1,128	10.83%	0	0.00%
1968	3,294	20.30%	2,957	18.22%	9,975	61.48%
1972	14,418	80.56%	2,933	16.39%	547	3.06%
1976	10,770	56.33%	7,914	41.39%	436	2.28%
1980	12,656	59.34%	8,274	38.80%	397	1.86%
1984	15,719	69.63%	6,786	30.06%	71	0.31%
1988	14,249	66.84%	6,953	32.62%	116	0.54%
1992	12,432	54.64%	8,333	36.62%	1,988	8.74%
1996	11,278	55.17%	7,965	38.96%	1,199	5.87%
2000	13,281	59.69%	8,500	38.20%	470	2.11%
2004	16,318	61.04%	10,220	38.23%	195	0.73%
2008	15,296	56.27%	11,622	42.75%	266	0.98%
2012	16,574	54.82%	13,272	43.89%	390	1.29%
2016	15,461	55.09%	11,716	41.75%	887	3.16%
2020	17,290	54.62%	13,755	43.45%	609	1.92%
2024	16,579	58.24%	11,475	40.31%	412	1.45%

== Education ==
There are three school districts in the county: Forrest County School District, Hattiesburg Public School District, and Petal School District.

Forrest County Agricultural High School is in the county.

The county is in the zone of Pearl River Community College.

== See also ==
- National Register of Historic Places listings in Forrest County, Mississippi
