= Forrest County Agricultural High School =

High school in Mississippi, United States

Location
- 215 Old Highway 49 East; Brooklyn, (Forrest County), Mississippi 39425; United States; 31.0695°N 89.1865°W

Information
- Type: Public high school
- Principal: Dr. Will Wheat
- Staff: 37.77 (FTE)
- Enrollment: 611 (2022-23)
- Student to teacher ratio: 16.18
- Colors: Maroon and gray
- Mascot: Aggies

Forrest County Agricultural High School (FCAHS) is a public high school located in Brooklyn, in unincorporated Forrest County, Mississippi, United States. The school provides education to grades 9–12.

Forrest County AHS is the only independently functioning agricultural high school in the state of Mississippi. There were three in 2010, but now one, Hinds County Agricultural High School, has closed, and the other, Coahoma Agricultural High School, converted into an early college HS.

An independent school board operates FCAHS, which has its own farm and ranch. Those affiliated with the school are known as "Aggies."

== History ==
Forrest County Agricultural High School was established in 1911 by an act of the Mississippi Legislature as an agricultural boarding school located on 320 acres of donated land. Students from across Mississippi, the United States, and several foreign countries have been educated here. In 1996, the school was listed as a Mississippi landmark by the historical society.

Its academic performance, as of 2012, was at the Mississippi average. In a seven-year period from 2005 to 2012 the enrollment increased. A 2012 report by Augenblick, Palaich and Associates suggested that FCAHS should continue operation as is.

== Demographics ==
=== 2006–07 school year ===
There were a total of 588 students enrolled at Forrest County Agricultural High School during the 2006–2007 school year. The gender makeup of the school was 51% female and 49% male. The student body was 68.88% White, 30.44% African American, and 0.68% Hispanic. 39.3% of the school's students were eligible to receive free lunch. Under head coach Larry Dolan, the Aggies reached the playoffs in each of nine seasons from 2005-2013 and made four trips to the third round of the 4-A state playoffs. In 2006, the Aggies went undefeated in the regular season, losing to Terry in the third round, and completing the season with a 12–1 record. Among the final eight teams remaining in those 2006 4A state playoffs, F.C.A.H.S. is the only school to maintain its 4-A classification upon Mississippi's shift to a 6-A class system. The other seven teams now hold a 5-A or 6-A classification. As of 2012, the Aggies produced their first "straight from high school" Division I-FBS prospect in Adarius Perkins, who signed with Mississippi State University in February of that year. In the 2013 season, the Aggies reached the South State Championship for the first time, defeating Quitman at home. Following South State, the Aggies overcame the Lafayette Commodores to become the 2013 4-A State Champions. Shortly after the season ended, Forrest County had three signees on February 5. The most notable among these signees was Dontavian Lee, who signed a scholarship to play Running Back at Mississippi State University.

=== Previous school years ===
School Year	Enrollment	Gender Makeup		Racial Makeup				
School Year	Enrollment	Female	Male	Asian	African American	Hispanic	Native American	Caucasian
2005-06	602	50%	50%	–	28.57%	0.50%	0.16%	70.76%
2004-05	576	50%	50%	–	28.13%	0.87%	–	71.01%
2003-04	550	49%	51%	0.18%	25.27%	0.55%	–	74.00%
2002-03	529	49%	51%	–	24.95%	0.57%	–	74.48%

== Accountability statistics ==
	2006-07	2005-06	2004-05	2003-04	2002-03
District Accreditation Status	Accredited	Accredited	Accredited	Accredited	Accredited
School Performance Classifications
Level 5 (Superior Performing)		X	X		
Level 4 (Exemplary)	X			X	X
Level 3 (Successful)					
Level 2 (Under Performing)					
Level 1 (Low Performing)					

== See also ==
- Coahoma Early College High School, formerly Coahoma Agricultural High School, closed in 2021
- Hinds County Agricultural High School - One of three remaining independent agricultural high schools in the state until its 2014 closure
- List of high schools in Mississippi
- List of school districts in Mississippi
