= Eatonville, Mississippi =

- Unincorporated community
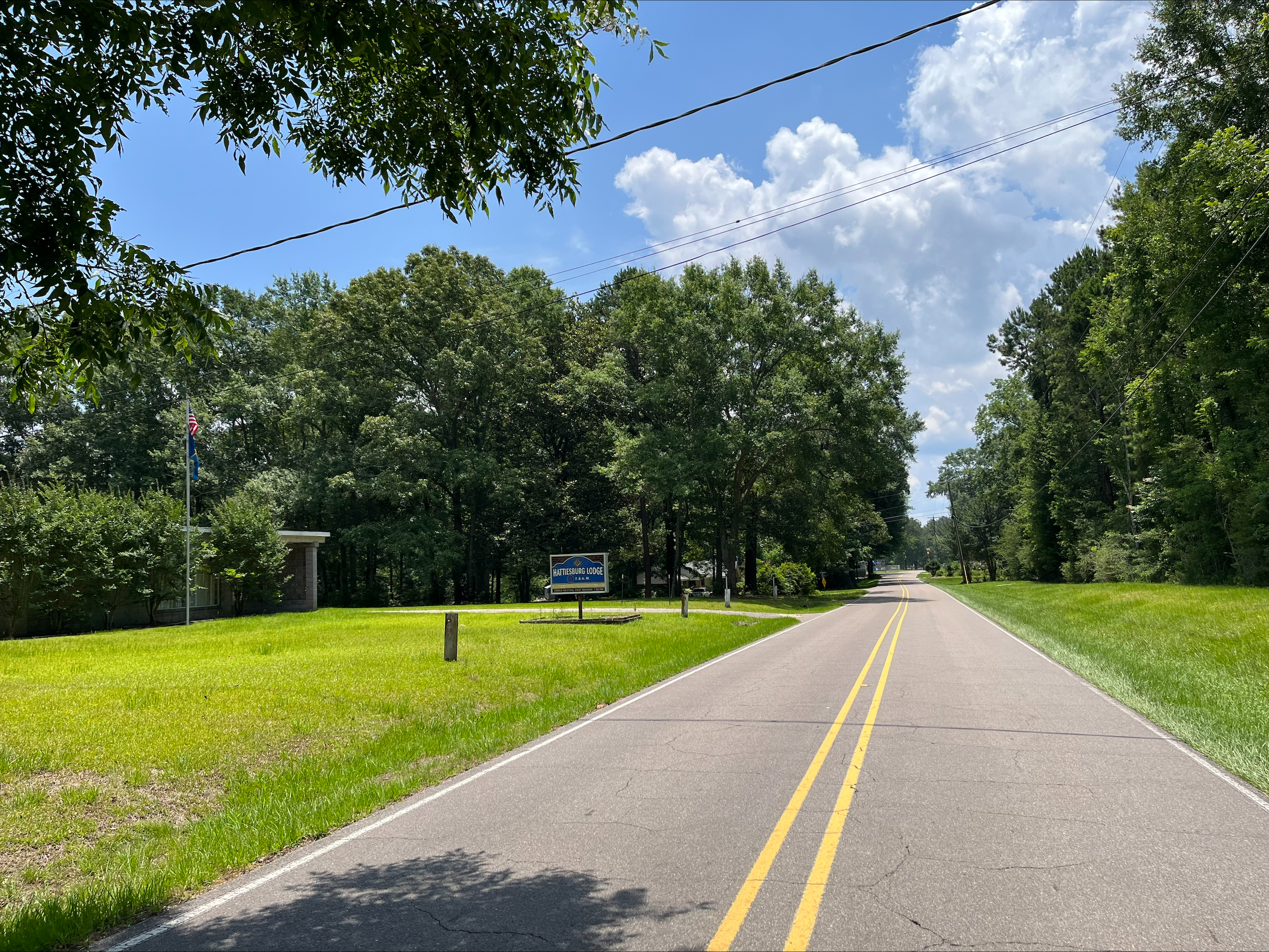
- Eatonville Road in Eatonville

- Location within the state of Mississippi
- Coordinates: 31°24′50″N 89°19′45″W
- Country: United States
- State: Mississippi
- County: Forrest
- Elevation: 282 ft (86 m)
- Time zone: UTC-6 (Central (CST))
  - Summer (DST): UTC-5 (CDT)
- GNIS feature ID: 669635

Eatonville (also known as Eastonville) is a small unincorporated community in Forrest County, Mississippi, United States, north of Hattiesburg, Mississippi. It is home to North Forrest High School.

== History ==
The oldest church in Forrest County, Providence Baptist Church, was originally built in 1818.

== Geography ==
The Eatonville Flat is a geologic feature 1 mile east of Eatonville.

== Education ==
North Forrest High School on Eatonville Road serves grades 7 to 12 and is the only high school in Forrest County School District. The student body is 2/3 African American and 1/5 white. The school colors are royal blue and white. In 2021 Todd Lowery was announced as the new football coach.

== Notable people ==
- Clyde Kennard, Korean War veteran and civil rights activist
- Harold Ray Watson, missionary and teacher
