= Henry S. Jacobs Camp =

Summer camp in the United States

Coordinates: 32.09649°N 90.56609°W

Henry S. Jacobs Camp logo

URJ Henry S. Jacobs Camp (a.k.a. HSJ) is a Jewish summer camp run by the Union for Reform Judaism (URJ), serving the Deep South (Alabama, Arkansas, Louisiana, Mississippi, Western Tennessee, and the Florida Panhandle). It was established in 1970.

The camp is one of 15 camps owned and operated by the URJ, the organizing body for Reform Judaism in North America. Jacobs is a non-profit camp, affiliated with the Mississippi Camping Association. It is accredited by the American Camp Association.

== Development ==
In 1954, a group of Jewish parents primarily from some small towns of the Mississippi Delta began fundraising for a summer camp where their small-town children could meet each other in a Jewish environment. In 1968 the land for the camp was purchased in Utica, Mississippi, for $100,000 and construction began on November 9, 1969. The camp opened in June 1970 and was named after Henry S. Jacobs, who died in 1963, and was instrumental in getting the funding for the camp. Campers study from a six-volume course written by various Jewish scholars that teach everything from history, to Jewish holidays and symbols.

== Camp history ==
In 1970, the camp's first summer, there were 93 campers in two sessions (roughly 30 in Session I and 60 in Session II). In 1977 a third unit was added. In 1979 the units were renamed Garin, Maskilim and Talmidim.

The Berman Center, a gymnasium, was built in 1985. In 1988, the Museum of the Southern Jewish Experience (now part of the Goldring / Woldenberg Institute of Southern Jewish Life) was built.

The Olim program was added to Jacobs Camp in 1989, and the Talmidim unit went from two four-week sessions to one six-week session.

== Staff ==
=== Directors ===
- Rabbi Solomon "Sol" Kaplan (1970)
- Macy B. Hart (1971–1999)
- Jonathan "J.C." Cohen (2000–2014)
- Anna Blumenfeld Herman (2015–present)

== See also ==
- Jewish education
