= Brooklyn, Mississippi =

- Unincorporated community
- Location within the state of Mississippi
- Coordinates: 31°3′23″N 89°11′10″W
- Country: United States
- State: Mississippi
- County: Forrest
- Time zone: UTC-6 (Central (CST))
  - Summer (DST): UTC-5 (CDT)
- ZIP codes: 39425

Brooklyn is a small unincorporated community in southern Forrest County, Mississippi. It is part of the Hattiesburg, Mississippi Metropolitan Statistical Area.

== History ==
Brooklyn was settled in association with the construction of an early railroad in the area, the Gulf and Ship Island Railroad. The town was originally called Bullis after one of the construction engineers. It was later renamed Brooklyn after one of the pioneer families. Brooklyn was once home to three pine lumber mills, multiple general stores, three drugs stores, and a grocery store. A school once operated in Brooklyn.

A post office first began operation under the name Brooklyn in 1897.

Two of the early settlers, John and Sam Perkins, ran the Perkins Merchandise store and Perkins Ferry on Black Creek. At that time, Black Creek was used to raft logs cut from the pine forests surrounding Brooklyn down to the trade center of Pascagoula.

== Geography ==
Brooklyn is located at latitude 31.0562946, longitude -89.1861676.

== Transportation ==
Brooklyn is served by U.S. Route 49.

== Education ==
The City of Brooklyn is served by the Forrest County School District. Also located in Brooklyn are Forrest County Agricultural High School (grades 9-12) and South Forrest Attendance Center (grades 1-8). FCAHS students are known as "Aggies." SFAC students are known as "Rebels."

== Places of worship ==
- Clear Creek Methodist Protestant Church
- First Baptist Church of Brooklyn
- Trueway Baptist Church
- Black Creek Baptist Church
- Brooklyn United Methodist Church
- Fellowship Chapel Non-Denominational Church
- Antioch Missionary Baptist Church
- Brooklyn Apostolic Church 91 Old Hwy 49E
- Grace Chapel Baptist Church

== Recreation ==
- Black Creek, Mississippi's only National Wild and Scenic River, a popular destination for canoeing, fishing, and camping.
- De Soto National Forest, a national forest surrounding Brooklyn.

== Climate ==
The climate in this area is characterized by relatively high temperatures and evenly distributed precipitation throughout the year. According to the Köppen Climate Classification system, Brooklyn has a Humid subtropical climate, abbreviated "Cfa" on climate maps.

== Notable person ==
- Harold Ray Watson, missionary and agronomist

== See also ==
Black Creek Wilderness
