= Don Hahs =

- Born: 17 December 1942 (age 82); Cape Girardeau, Missouri, United States
- Occupation: Labor leader
- Known for: President of the Brotherhood of Locomotive Engineers and Trainmen

Don Hahs (born 17 December 1942) was president of the Brotherhood of Locomotive Engineers and Trainmen (BLET), a railway workers' union in the United States.

== Early career ==
Don Hahs was born on 17 December 1942 in Cape Girardeau, Missouri. His father, E.D. Hahs, was a member of BLE Division 442. Don Hahs joined the St. Louis Southwestern Railway as a clerk in 1961, and advanced to manager of special services in the traffic department. In 1974 he was promoted to locomotive engineer for the Southern Pacific Railroad. He joined BLE Division 366 in 1975.

Hahs was local chairman of BLE Division 366 in Del Rio, Texas, from 1977 to 1980, when he was elected BLE general chairman of the Southern Pacific Railroad-Eastern Lines General Committee of Adjustment. In 1986 he became a member of the BLE Constitution & Bylaws Committee. He was elected vice president of the union in 1996. In this role he helped with the merger of Union Pacific and Southern Pacific.

== Union President ==
On 27 September 2001 Hahs was elected BLE President at the union's convention in Miami Beach, Florida. He defeated the incumbent, Edward Dubroski, in a run-off election by 417 to 211 votes. In 2003 the members of the BLE ratified a national contract that Hahs had helped to negotiate. Hahs worked with James P. Hoffa of the International Brotherhood of Teamsters (IBT) to merge the two unions, which took effect on 1 January 2004. The BLE changed its name to the Brotherhood of Locomotive Engineers and Trainmen (BLET) on that date. Hahs was reelected president on 21 June 2006.

In September 2007 a Teamsters oversight board accused Hahs of embezzling $58,000 of union funds. The board alleged that he had used the money to buy tickets to matches of the Cleveland Cavaliers, a basketball team, and to pay for his wife's travel expenses. Hahs was suspended from the union for a year, and was barred from holding IBT office or employment until 2010. He was replaced as president by Edward Rodzwicz.
