= Hinds County Agricultural High School =

High school in Mississippi, United States

Location
- Mississippi Highway 18; Utica, Mississippi 39175-0089; United States; 32°02′48″N 90°37′26″W

Information
- Other name: Hinds Agricultural High School
- School type: Public, secondary
- Closed: 1 July 2014
- School district: Hinds Community College District
- Authority: Mississippi Department of Education
- Grades: 9–12
- Gender: Coeducational
- Campus: Hinds Community College, Utica Campus
- Campus type: Rural
- Athletics: MHSAA Class 1A
- Accreditation: Mississippi Department of Education
- Website: web.archive.org/*/http://www.hindsahs.k12.ms.us/
- Formerly one of three independent agricultural high schools in Mississippi.

Hinds County Agricultural High School or Hinds Agricultural High School (HAHS) was a public secondary school in unincorporated Hinds County, Mississippi, United States, south of Utica. It was located on the Utica campus of Hinds Community College until its 2014 closure. Hinds County AHS was one of three independently functioning agricultural high schools in the state of Mississippi. The community college district operated the high school.

== History ==
In 2012 the Mississippi Board of Education published a report recommending the closure of Hinds AHS. Augenblick, Palaich and Associates, the report's author, stated that enrollment was declining at Hinds, that it had among the lowest levels of academic performance, and that it no longer had a focus on agriculture.

Hinds AHS closed on July 1, 2014. According to state law, its real property was to be given to Hinds Community College and its personal property was to be given to the Hinds County School District. On July 1, 2015, its property was transferred to the Hinds County School District.

== Athletics ==
In 2014 the boys' track team won the third Class 1A championship of the MHSAA; this occurred just prior to the disestablishment of the school.

== Demographics ==
=== 2006–07 school year ===
There were a total of 222 students enrolled at Hinds County Agricultural High School during the 2006–07 school year. The gender makeup of the school was 52% female and 48% male. The racial makeup of the school was 99.55% African American and 0.45% White. 78.2% of the school's students were eligible to receive free lunch.

=== Previous school years ===
| School Year | Enrollment | Gender Makeup | | Racial Makeup | | | | |
|---|---|---|---|---|---|---|---|---|
| School Year | Enrollment | Female | Male | Asian | African; American | Hispanic | Native; American | White |
| 2005/06 | 241 | 52% | 48% | – | 100.00% | – | – | – |
| 2004/05 | 299 | 49% | 51% | – | 100.00% | – | – | – |
| 2003/04 | 307 | 50% | 50% | – | 100.00% | – | – | – |
| 2002/03 | 290 | 49% | 51% | – | 100.00% | – | – | – |

== Accountability statistics ==
| | 2006/07 | 2005/06 | 2004/05 | 2003/04 | 2002/03 |
|---|---|---|---|---|---|
| District Accreditation Status | Accredited | Accredited | Accredited | Accredited | Accredited |
School Performance Classifications
| Level 5 (Superior Performing) | | | | | |
| Level 4 (Exemplary) | | | | | |
| Level 3 (Successful) | X | X | X | | X |
| Level 2 (Under Performing) | | | | X | |
| Level 1 (Low Performing) | | | | | |

== See also ==
- Forrest County Agricultural High School
- Coahoma Early College High School (formerly Coahoma Agricultural High School) - Closed in 2021
- List of high schools in Mississippi
- List of school districts in Mississippi
