= Mississippi Highway 609 =

State Highway in Mississippi

Mississippi Highway 609

Route information
- Maintained by MDOT
- Length: 20.510 mi (33.008 km)
- Existed: 1992–present

Southern segment
- Length: 2.959 mi (4.762 km)
- South end: US 90 in Ocean Springs
- South end: I-10 in St. Martin

Northern segment
- Length: 17.551 mi (28.246 km)
- South end: Old Biloxi Road in Latimer
- North end: Vestry Road in Vestry

Location
- Country: United States
- State: Mississippi
- Counties: Jackson

Highway system
- Mississippi State Highway System; Interstate; US; State
← MS 607	→ MS 611

Mississippi Highway 609 (MS 609) is a 20.5-mile-long (33.0 km) north-south state highway in Jackson County in the Mississippi Gulf Coast region of Mississippi, consisting of two sections. The first is signed along Washington Avenue between US Highway 90 (US 90) and Interstate 10 (I-10), and the second is unsigned and continues north from Latimer at Old Biloxi Road to Vestry Road in Vestry.

== Route description ==
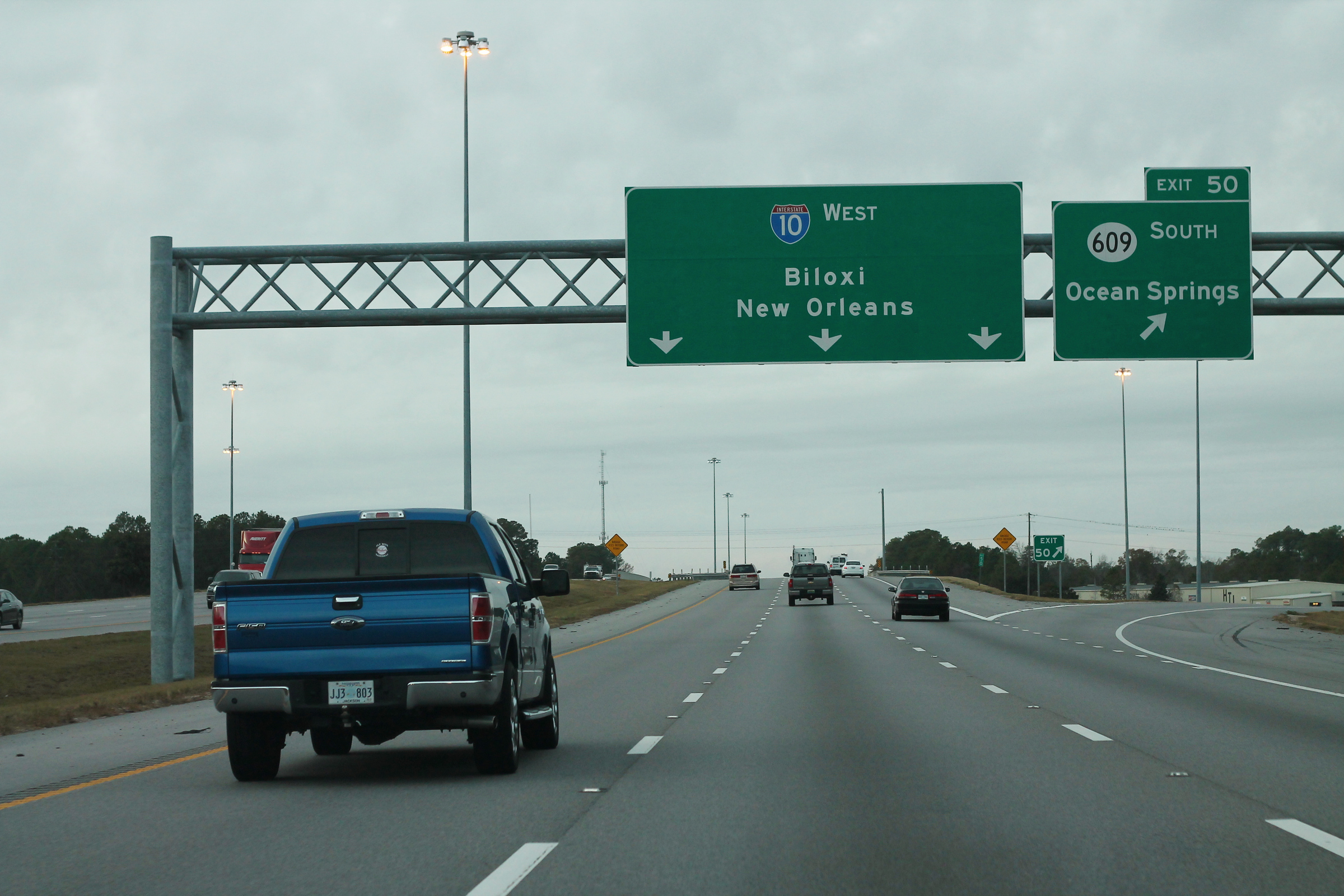
I-10 westbound at its interchange with MS 609 in Gulf Hills (exit 50)

The signed section of MS 609 begins in Ocean Springs at an intersection with US 90, with the road continuing south into downtown. MS 609 heads north along Washington Avenue as a four-lane undivided highway through a neighborhood before crossing the Fort Bayou Drawbridge over Old Fort Bayou into the neighboring community of Gulf Hills. The highway passes by a golf course and through a mix of a business district and neighborhoods for several blocks before crossing Lemoyne Boulevard where it begins to straddle the border of St. Martin and Gulf Hills. It now passes a major business district before meeting I-10 at an interchange (exit 50). State maintenance continues a short distance further along Tucker Road until ending at the next intersection with Cook Road and Seaman Road on the border of Latimer.

Tucker Road, which later becomes Old Biloxi Road, continues through Latimer as a local road. After crossing Bayou Costapia, the MS 609 officially resumes, but the highway is not signed as such and is not maintained by the state. The highway leaves Latimer to a less populated area for the next several miles as it travels through the remote wooded terrain of the De Soto National Forest, with very few homes and businesses in the vicinity of the highway. Within the forest, the highway passes through Larue. MS 609 finally leaves the forest and enters the small community of Vestry, where it comes to an end at an intersection with Vestry Road, roughly six miles (9.7 km) east of the Red Creek Off-Road ATV park and campground, as well as three miles (4.8 km) west of MS 57. The northern segment does not intersect any other state highways.

== Major intersections ==
The entire route is in Jackson County.

Location	mi	km	Destinations	Notes
Ocean Springs	0.000	0.000	US 90 (Bienville Boulevard); Washington Avenue – Downtown Ocean Springs	Southern terminus; road continues south as Washington Avenue; southern end of signed section
Gulf Hills–St. Martin line	2.734– 2.959	4.400– 4.762	I-10 / Tucker Road – New Orleans, Mobile, Latimer	I-10 exit 50; northern end of signed section
Gap in route
Latimer	2.959	4.762	Old Biloxi Road	Southern end of unsigned section
Vestry	20.510	33.008	Vestry Road to MS 57	Northern terminus; northern end of unsigned section
1.000 mi = 1.609 km; 1.000 km = 0.621 mi
