= Piave =

Piave may refer to:

- Piave (river), in north Italy
- Piave, Mississippi, U.S.
- Piave railway station, Naples, Italy
- Piave cheese, an Italian cow's milk cheese named after the Piave river
- Francesco Maria Piave (1810–1876), Italian librettist, journalist and theater impresario

== See also ==
- Battle of Piave River (disambiguation)
- 10th Infantry Division "Piave"
