= Mississippi Highway 57 =

State Highway in Mississippi

Mississippi Highway 57

Route information
- Maintained by MDOT
- Length: 97.6 mi (157.1 km) (90.780 mi excluding concurrencies)
- Existed: 1960–present

Major junctions
- South end: US 90 in Fontainebleau
- I-10 in Fontainebleau; US 98 in McLain; MS 42 in State Line
- North end: US 45 in State Line

Location
- Country: United States
- State: Mississippi
- Counties: Jackson, George, Greene, Wayne

Highway system
- Mississippi State Highway System; Interstate; US; State
← I-55	→ I-59

Mississippi Highway 57 (MS 57) is a state highway in southeastern Mississippi. It runs in a north/south direction for approximately 97.6 miles (157.1 km), serving four counties: Jackson, George, Greene, and Wayne.

== Route description ==
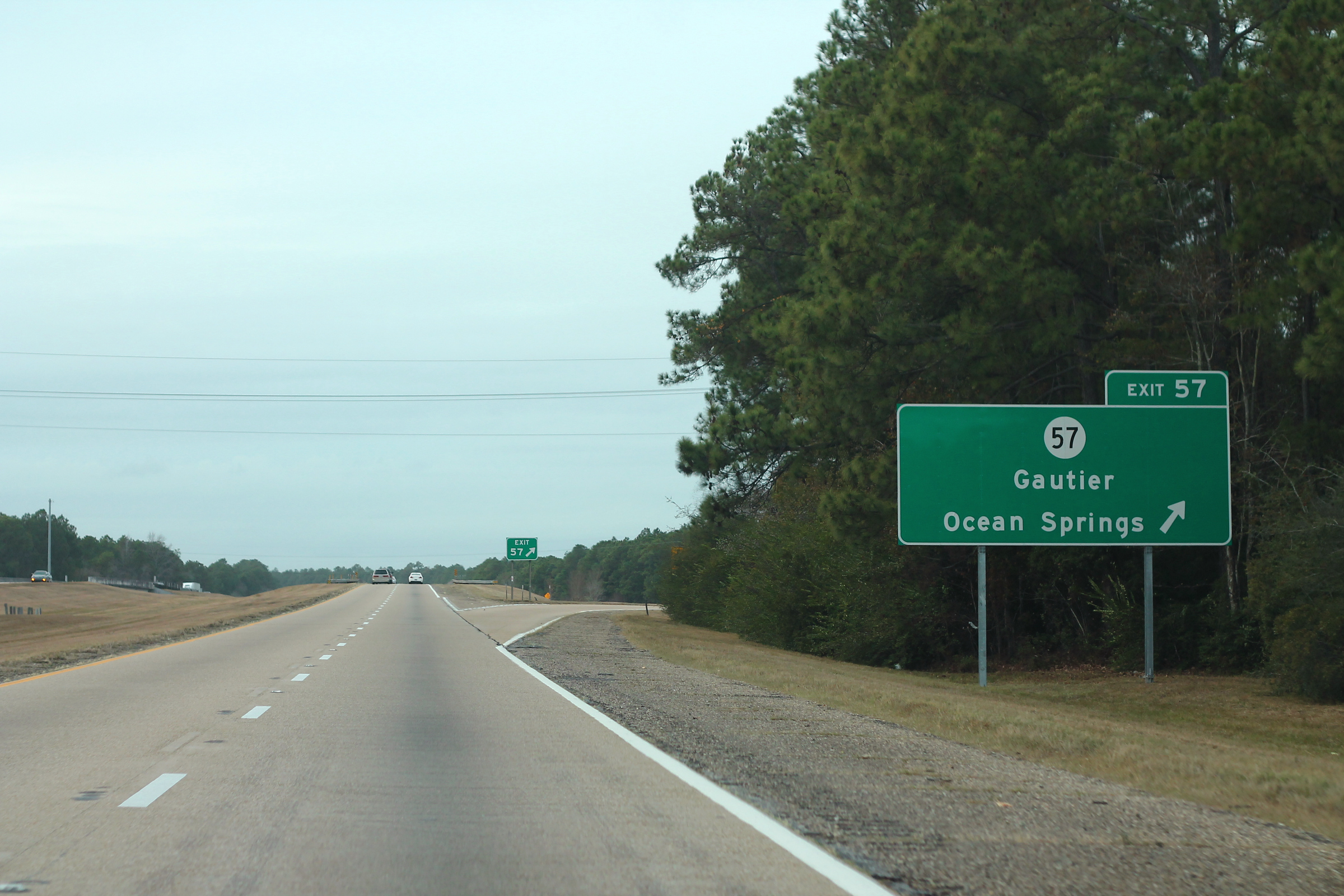
Interstate 10 westbound at its interchange with Mississippi Highway 57 (exit 57)

MS 57 begins in Jackson County on the Ocean Springs/Gautier city line in the small community of Fontainebleau at an intersection with U.S. Route 90 (US 90). It heads north as four-lane divided highway through mostly rural woodlands, passing by some homes and businesses here and there, for a little under 3.0 miles (4.8 km) to have an interchange with Interstate 10 (I-10) at its exit 57. The highway now narrows to two-lanes as it leaves Fontainebleau, as well as the city limits of both towns, to wind its way northward through a mix of farmland and wooded areas for several miles to pass through the community of Vancleave before paralleling the Pascagoula River along its western banks and crossing into George County.

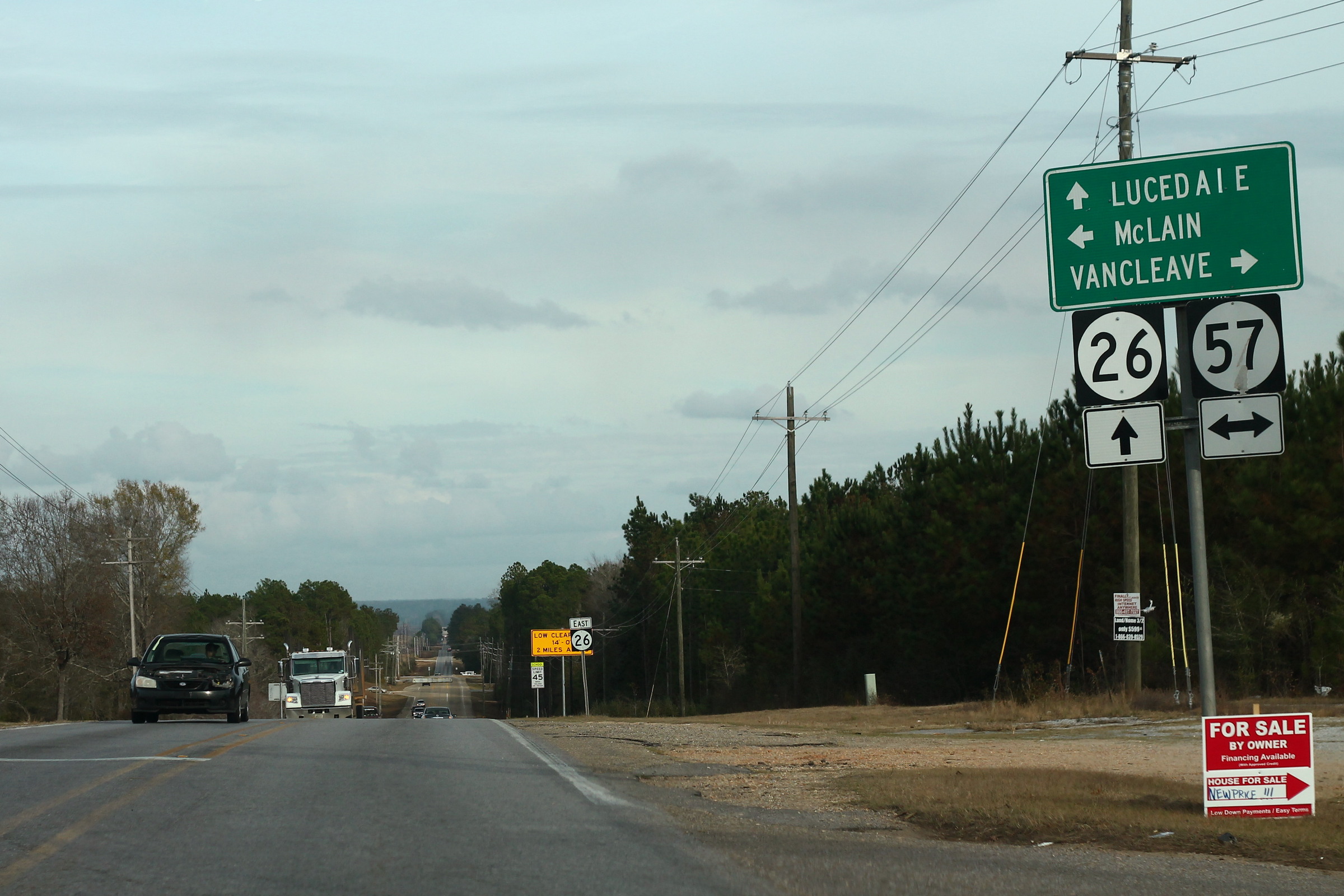
The intersection between MS 26 and MS 57 in Benndale

MS 57 continues winding its way north to cross Black Creek and travel through the community of Benndale, where it has an intersection with MS 26, before passing through the De Soto National Forest and traveling past where the Pascagoula River splits into the Leaf and Chickasawhay rivers, with MS 57 following the Leaf River and crossing into Greene County.

The highway passes through the community of Leaf before crossing over a railroad track to enter the town of McLain and have an intersection with MS 198. It now bypasses downtown along its eastern side before having an intersection and becoming concurrent (overlapped) with US 98. They head east as a four-lane divided highway to immediately cross a bridge over the Leaf River, as well as leave McLain, and travel through woodlands for couple miles, where they have another intersection with MS 198 (through this section is a short dead end due to the demolition of that highway's bridge over the Leaf River), before MS 57 splits off as a two-lane highway and travels through another section of the De Soto National Forest for the next several miles. MS 57 crosses over Big Creek to leave the National Forest and pass through the community of Hillman, and travel past the Green County Campus of Jones College, before entering the town of Leakesville and becoming concurrent with MS 63. They pass through town along Main Street, traveling through some neighborhoods and a business district before traveling straight through downtown. They then pass through more neighborhoods before crossing a 0.5 miles (0.80 km) long bridge over the Chickasawhay River to leave Leakesville and pass through some woodlands for the next few miles (where it has an intersection with its old alignment) to an interchange with MS 594, where MS 57 splits off and heads north along a four-lane divided expressway through remote woodlands (part of the Kurtz State Forest) for the next several miles.

MS 57 has a couple more intersections with its former two-lane alignment before entering the town of State Line, which it mostly bypasses along its eastern side as it has an interchange with MS 42 (St. Peter Street), where it crosses into Wayne County. MS 57 comes to an end shortly thereafter at a large interchange with US 45.

== History ==
=== Former MS 57 ===
Mississippi Highway 57
- Location: Biloxi–Wiggins
- Existed: 1932–1967

The MS 57 designation was first used from 1932–1960 along what is now the southern segment of MS 15 between Biloxi and its north end, as well as a portion MS 26 to the town of Wiggins.

=== MS 59 ===
Mississippi Highway 59
- Location: Fontainebleau–State Line
- Existed: 1932–1960

Between 1932 and 1958, the current routing of MS 57 was designated as Mississippi Highway 59 (MS 59). In 1960, it was renumbered to MS 57 in order to avoid confusion with the then new I-59.

=== Four-lane expressway ===
Between Leakesville and the highway's northern end in State Line, MS 57 was completely transformed from a narrow, rural, two-lane highway to a modern four-lane divided expressway. The project was completed in 2007, with portions of the new highway either overlapping or bypassing the original route. The purpose of this project was to connect four-lane US 45, which continues on to Meridian, to the Mississippi Gulf Coast, via the expressway continuing south along MS 63 into Pascagoula.

The original two-lane alignment followed MS 63 across the Chickasawhay River out of downtown Leakesville, as it does today (through it was on the original, now closed bridge on River Street). MS 57 then split off of MS 63 immediately thereafter and headed north along Old Highway 57 through farmland, then woodlands as it enters Kurtz State Forest, for several miles to join the current alignment for the next several miles. MS 57 then split off along Old Highway 57 to have an intersection Highway 45 Shortcut Road (a connector to the community of Yellow Pine) before entering the town of State Line along Main Street and passing through neighborhoods. Old MS 57 then came to an end at an intersection with MS 42 at the southern edge of downtown.

== Major intersections ==
County	Location	mi	km	Destinations	Notes
Jackson	Gautier–Ocean Springs line	0.0	0.0	US 90 – Fontainebleau, Gautier, Ocean Springs, Mississippi Vietnam Veterans Memorial Park, Gulf Islands National Seashore	Southern terminus
Jackson	Gautier	2.7– 2.9	4.3– 4.7	I-10 – New Orleans, Mobile	I-10 exit 57
George	Benndale	36.5	58.7	MS 26 – Wiggins, Lucedale	
Greene	McLain	53.4	85.9	MS 198 west – Downtown	Eastern terminus of MS 198
Greene	McLain	54.1	87.1	US 98 west – Beaumont, Hattiesburg	South end of US 98 overlap
Greene		55.0	88.5	MS 198 west – McLain	Former eastern terminus of MS 198; now closed due to demolition of bridge across Leaf River
Greene		56.0	90.1	US 98 east – Lucedale	North end of US 98 overlap
Greene		56.9	91.6	Neely Road – Neely	
Greene	Leakesville	70.0	112.7	MS 63 north – Sand Hill	South end of MS 63 overlap
Greene		73.7	118.6	MS 63 south / MS 594 east – Citronelle, Lucedale	Interchange; north end of MS 63 overlap; western terminus of MS 594
Wayne	State Line	96.4– 96.9	155.1– 155.9	MS 42 – State Line, Hattiesburg	Interchange
Wayne		97.6	157.1	US 45 – Waynesboro, Citronelle, Mobile	Interchange; northern terminus
1.000 mi = 1.609 km; 1.000 km = 0.621 mi: Closed/former; Concurrency terminus
