= Jackson County School District (Mississippi) =

School district in Mississippi

Coordinates: 30°31′14.16″N 88°41′17.52″W

The Jackson County School District (JCSD) is a public school district based in Jackson County, Mississippi (USA).

The district serves the communities of: Big Point, Gulf Hills, Hurley, Latimer, St. Martin, Vancleave, Wade, and portions of Escatawpa and Gautier.

The district is headquartered in Vancleave.

== Schools ==
- East Central Attendance Center
  - East Central High School (Grades 9-12)
  - East Central Middle School (Grades 6-8)
  - East Central Upper Elementary (Grades 3-5)
  - East Central Lower Elementary (Grades PreK-2)
- Vancleave Attendance Center
  - Vancleave High School (Grades 9-12)
  - Vancleave Middle School (Grades 6-8)
  - Vancleave Upper Elementary (Grades 4-5)
  - Vancleave Lower Elementary (Grades PreK-3)
- St. Martin Attendance Center
  - St. Martin High School (Grades 9-12)
  - St. Martin Middle School (Grades 6-8)
  - St. Martin Upper Elementary (Grades 4-5)
  - St. Martin East Elementary (Grades PreK-3)
  - St. Martin North Elementary (Grades K-3)

== Demographics ==
=== 2011-12 school year ===
There were a total of 9,357 students enrolled in the Jackson County School District in the 2011–2012 school year.

=== Previous school years ===
School Year	Enrollment	Gender Makeup		Racial Makeup				
School Year	Enrollment	Female	Male	Asian	African American	Hispanic	Native American	White
2005-06	8,326	48%	52%	3.52%	7.30%	1.12%	0.19%	87.87%
2004-05	8,431	48%	52%	3.55%	7.15%	1.26%	0.19%	87.85%
2003-04	8,509	48%	52%	3.41%	7.06%	1.01%	0.21%	88.31%
2002-03	8,512	48%	52%	3.35%	7.48%	0.86%	0.18%	88.13%

== Accountability statistics ==
	2006-07	2005-06	2004-05	2003-04	2002-03
District Accreditation Status	Accredited	Accredited	Accredited	Accredited	Accredited
School Performance Classifications
Level 5 (Superior Performing) Schools	10	11	11	10	7
Level 4 (Exemplary) Schools	1	0	0	1	4
Level 3 (Successful) Schools	0	0	0	0	0
Level 2 (Under Performing) Schools	0	0	0	0	0
Level 1 (Low Performing) Schools	0	0	0	0	0
Not Assigned	2	2	2	2	2

== St. Martin High School bomb threat ==
On March 28, 2007 a bomb threat was found in a boys' restroom in St. Martin High's "blue building". The current principal, Dr. Toriano Holloway quickly evacuated the building into the neighboring building while the Jackson County Sheriff's Office and SWAT team searched the building for the "Bomb". Then, another threat was found in an undisclosed area, this time, for the building containing the student body. Officials quickly moved the students to safety in the Football field bleachers, where they would stay for about an hour and thirty minutes. When the SWAT team and Police gave the all-clear confirming there was no bomb, the student body was returned to their respective classes and the day continued on regular schedule.

== See also ==
- List of school districts in Mississippi
