= Mississippi Highway 536 =

State highway in Mississippi

Mississippi Highway 536

Route information
- Length: 21.322 mi (34.314 km)
- Existed: 1959–present

Major junctions
- West end: MS 15 near Laurel
- East end: MS 63 near Waynesboro

Location
- Country: United States
- State: Mississippi
- Counties: Jones, Wayne

Highway system
- Mississippi State Highway System; Interstate; US; State
| ← MS 535 | → MS 537 |

Mississippi Highway 536 (MS 536) is an unsigned highway that runs from MS 15 southwest of Laurel to MS 63 southwest of Waynesboro in the U.S. state of Mississippi. Only about two miles (3.2 km) of the overall highway is paved and state maintained. The majority of the route is a dirt road that runs through De Soto National Forest.

== Route description ==
The unsigned highway begins along MS 15 about three miles (4.8 km) southeast of Tuckers Crossing and about eight miles (13 km) southeast of Laurel in a rural area of Jones County. The two-lane state-maintained roadway heads north as George Boutwell Road. It heads past some houses and open fields and makes a sharp curve to the east before resuming a northeasterly course. At Road 201, the MS 536 designation turns onto it which is a dirt road. Heading southeast, the road's surroundings becomes completely forest as it formally enters De Soto National Forest. Upon entering Wayne County, the road name becomes Strickland Road, but remains a dirt surface. Through the Wayne County portion, MS 536 remains on an easterly course through the forest, though some open fields and homes appear along the road. At the end of Strickland Road, the MS 536 turns to the north onto the paved but not state maintained Camp 8 Road. Its length on Camp 8 Road is short, totaling about 400 feet (120 m), as it comes to an end at an intersection with MS 63, about four miles (6.4 km) southwest of Clara and about eleven miles (18 km) southwest of Waynesboro.

== History ==
MS 536 first appeared on state maps in 1960. It may have been state maintained at the time of its designation around 1959 however by 1962, it was not. By 1967, the state removed MS 536 from its map and had not reappeared until its 1998 map. No major changes to its routing have occurred since its initial designation

== Major intersections ==
| County | Location | mi | km | Destinations | Notes |
|---|---|---|---|---|---|
| Jones | | 0.000 | 0.000 | MS 15 | Western terminus |
| Wayne | | 21.322 | 34.314 | MS 63 | Eastern terminus |
1.000 mi = 1.609 km; 1.000 km = 0.621 mi
