= Mississippi Highway 63 =

State Highway in Mississippi

Mississippi Highway 63

Route information
- Maintained by MDOT
- Length: 106.553 mi (171.480 km)
- Existed: 1932–present

Major junctions
- South end: US 90 / MS 611 in Pascagoula
- I-10 in Pascagoula; US 98 in Lucedale
- North end: MS 184 in Waynesboro

Location
- Country: United States
- State: Mississippi
- Counties: Jackson, George, Greene, Wayne

Highway system
- Mississippi State Highway System; Interstate; US; State
← US 61	→ MS 67

Mississippi Highway 63 (MS 63) is a state highway in southeastern Mississippi that runs north–south for approximately 105 miles (169 km). It serves Jackson County, George County, Greene County, and Wayne County.

== Route description ==
MS 63 begins in Jackson County in Pascagoula at an interchange with US 90, with the road continuing south into an industrial park as MS 611. It heads north as a four-lane divided highway to immediately leave Pascagoula and enter neighboring Moss Point, where it passes through some neighborhoods to have an intersection with Grierson Street (unsigned MS 618) and cross over the Escatawpa River. The highway travels through a business district before having an interchange with I-10 (Exit 69) and passing by the Trent Lott International Airport. MS 63 now leaves Moss Point and heads north through rural areas, parallel to the Pascagoula River, for the next several miles, passing through the communities of Escatawpa (where it has an intersection with MS 613 and passes by Plant Daniel) and Wade (where it has an intersection with MS 614) before crossing into George County.

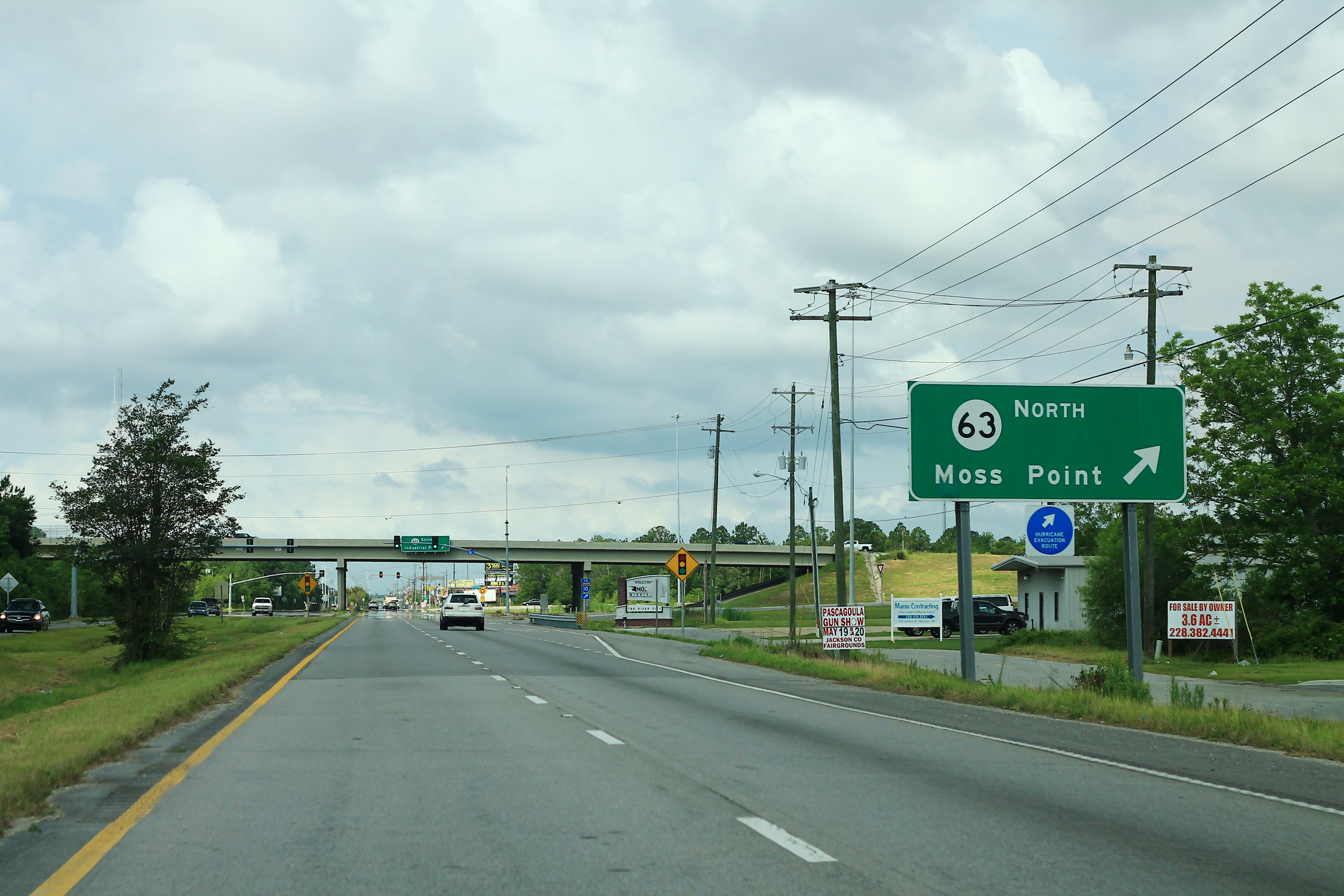
The southern terminus MS 63 at its interchange between US 90 and MS 611, as viewed from US 90 westbound in Pascagoula

MS 63 continues north through rural farmland for several miles to have an intersection with Old Highway 63 before following an expressway grade bypass of the town of Lucedale, passing through the western side of town as it has an interchange with MS 26, crosses over MS 198 without an interchange or connection of any kind, and an interchange with US 98. It now leaves the Lucedale area and travels through woodlands for a couple miles to cross into Greene County.

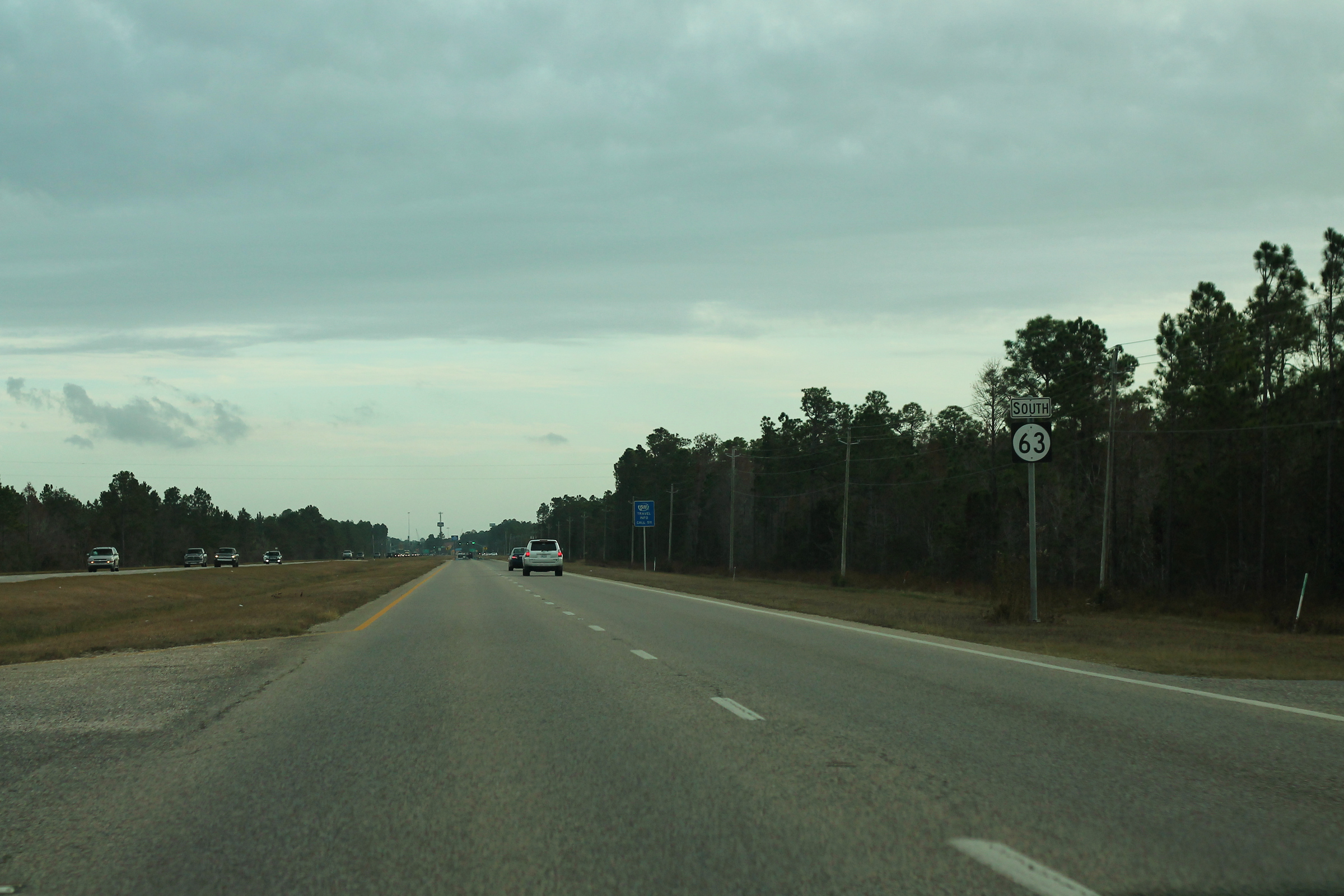
Typical scene along Mississippi Highway 63

MS 63 continues through woodlands for the next several miles (part of the Kurtz State Forest) to an interchange between MS 57 and MS 594 (Old Highway 63), with the expressway continuing north along MS 57, and MS 63 becomes concurrent (overlapped) with MS 57 southbound and they head northwest as a two-lane highway to have an intersection with Old Highway 57 before crossing the Chickasawhay River into the town of Leakesville. MS 57/MS 63 travel straight through downtown along Main Street (passing by the Greene County Courthouse) before the two highways split on the western side of town, with MS 63 heading northwest to pass by the South Mississippi Correctional Institution before cutting in-and-out of the De Soto National Forest for the next several miles. The highway travels through the community of Sand Hill, where it has an intersection and short concurrency with MS 42, before crossing into Wayne County.

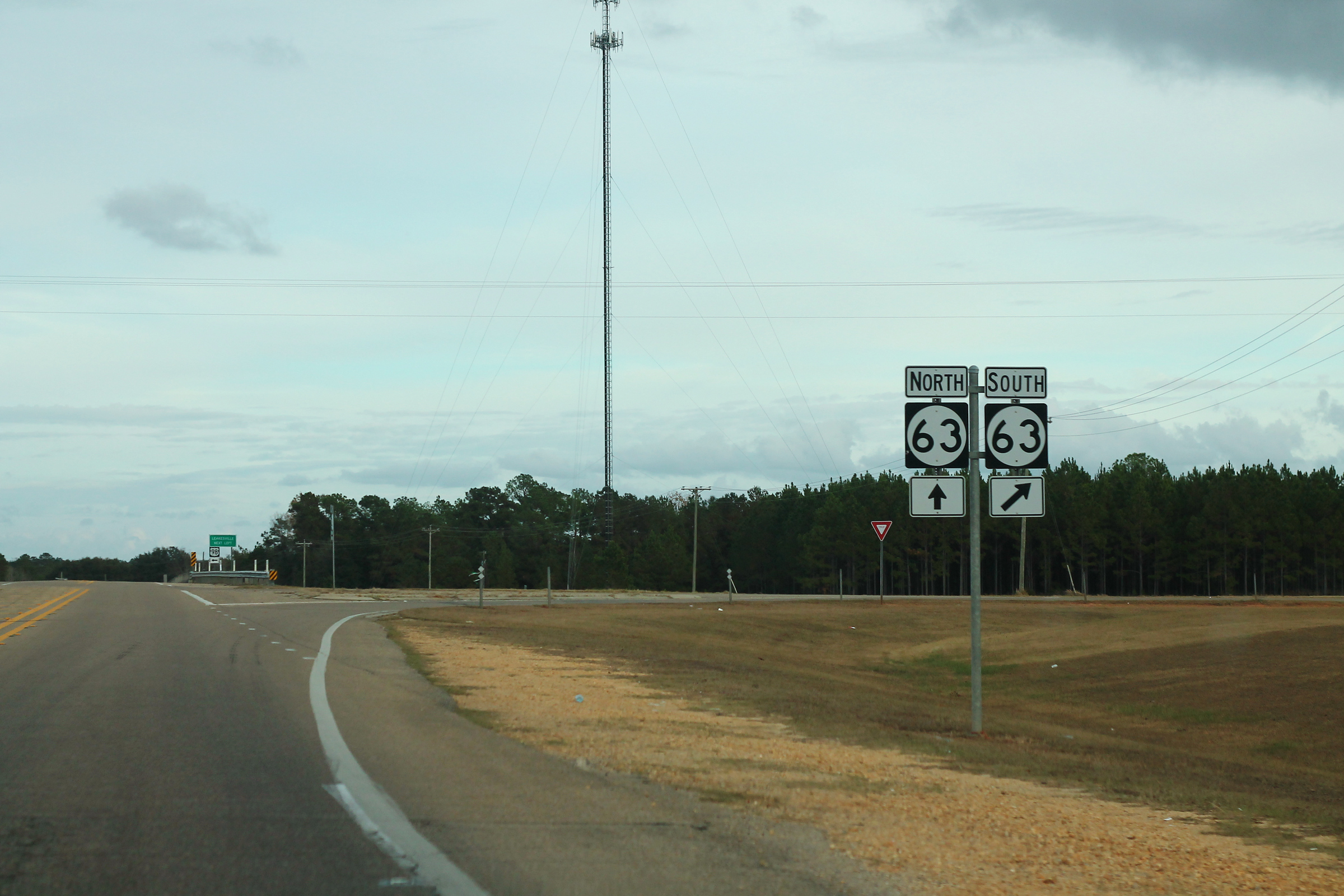
MS 26 at the interchange with MS 63 just outside Lucedale

MS 63 now travels through a large tract of the National Forest, where it has an intersection with Strickland Road (unsigned MS 536), before leaving the National Forest permanently and winding its way northeast through the community of Clara before crossing the Chickasawhay River for a second time to enter the city of Waynesboro. The highway passes through neighborhoods along Turner Street before entering downtown and coming to an end at an intersection with MS 184 (Azalea Drive).

== History ==
Mississippi Highway 63 provides part of a four-lane corridor connecting Moss Point and the Gulf Coast with US 45 north to Meridian.

MS 63 bypasses Lucedale to the west along a controlled access expressway completed in November 2000. Six miles of the former alignment of MS 63 and two miles of MS 26 were turned over to George County and Lucedale city maintenance once the bypass opened. MS 63 previously ran along Winter and Main Streets, including overlaps with both MS 26 and US 98/MS 198. Until August 22, 2011, the four lane section of MS 63 ended at a diamond interchange with US 98 to the northwest of Lucedale. Opening at that time was the continuation of the four lane corridor north to MS 57 and MS 594 near Leakesville. MS 57 runs along the northernmost extent of the corridor to US 45 at State Line.

Construction on the 25 mile long section of four-lane roadway for MS 63 and MS 57 in George and Greene Counties commenced in 2008 with the awarding of a $42.1 million contract to Tanner Construction of Ellisville. The four lane alignment of MS 57/63 was incorporated into the four lane corridor extending north along US 45 to Corinth and the Tennessee state line. The 110-mile corridor through the Southern District of the Mississippi Department of Transportation (MDOT) cost $325 million overall. Initial work built the new roadway northward from the Jackson County line in 1992.

Work started on the interchange joining the south end of MS 63 with MS 611 and US 90 in December 2010. Funded by a $35 million Mississippi Development Authority grant, the $21 million first phase made improvements along MS 63 and MS 611, including the 711 foot long overpass spanning US 90 and the adjacent CSX Railroad. Costing $13.6 million, the second phase widening MS 611 to five lanes from Old Mobile Highway to the Chevron refinery in Pascagoula, commenced in March 2014.

Historically, the alignment of MS 613 was the previous route for MS 63. MS 63 was realigned westward from Big Point, Hurley and Agricola in 1960, with MS 613 designated northward from their meeting outside Moss Point to US 98 in Lucedale. With a new alignment built for MS 63 south into Moss Point, MS 613 was extended south over the former MS 63 to Pascagoula by 1981.

== Major intersections ==
County	Location	mi	km	Destinations	Notes
Jackson	Pascagoula–Moss Point line	0.0	0.0	US 90 / MS 611 south – Mobile, Pascagoula, Industrial Park	Interchange; southern terminus; northern terminus of southern section of MS 611
Jackson	Moss Point	1.2	1.9	MS 618 - Moss Point	
Jackson	Moss Point	3.7– 4.0	6.0– 6.4	I-10 – New Orleans, Mobile	I-10 exit 69
Jackson		9.7	15.6	MS 613 – Escatawpa, Hurley	
Jackson	Wade	18.2	29.3	MS 614 east – Hurley, Wildlife Management Areas	Western terminus of MS 614
George		33.0	53.1	Old Highway 63 – Lucedale	Former MS 63 north
George		36.1– 36.7	58.1– 59.1	MS 26 – Wiggins, Lucedale	Interchange
George		40.8– 41.1	65.7– 66.1	US 98 – Hattiesburg, Mobile	Interchange
Greene		54.4	87.5	MS 57 north / MS 594 east – State Line, Citronelle	Interchange; south end of MS 57 overlap; western terminus of MS 594
Greene		56.8	91.4	Old Highway 57 – State Line	Former MS 57 north
Greene	Leakesville	58.4	94.0	MS 57 south – McLain	North end of MS 57 overlap
Greene	Sand Hill	77.8	125.2	MS 42 west – Richton	South end of MS 42 overlap
Greene		78.4	126.2	MS 42 east – State Line	North end of MS 42 overlap
Wayne		93.1	149.8	Strickland Road (MS 536 west/FR 201) - De Soto National Forest	Eastern terminus of unsigned MS 536
Wayne	Waynesboro	106.6	171.6	MS 184 to US 84 / MS 145 – Laurel, Silas, AL, Quitman	Northern terminus
1.000 mi = 1.609 km; 1.000 km = 0.621 mi: Concurrency terminus
