= Mississippi Highway 594 =

Highway in Mississippi

Mississippi Highway 594

Route information
- Maintained by MDOT
- Length: 5.6 mi (9.0 km)

Major junctions
- West end: MS 57 / MS 63 near Leakesville
- East end: CR 96 at the Alabama line near Leakesville

Location
- Country: United States
- State: Mississippi
- Counties: Greene

Highway system
- Mississippi State Highway System; Interstate; US; State
← MS 591	→ MS 598

Mississippi Highway 594 (MS 594) is a highway in southern Mississippi. Its western terminus is at MS 57/MS 63 near Leakesville. It then travels east, and its eastern terminus is at CR 96 at the Alabama line.

== Route description ==
MS 594 starts at MS 57/MS 63 near Leakesville it travels east as Old Hwy 63 and then turns left and then ends at CR 96 at the Alabama line.

== Major intersections ==
The entire route is in Greene County.

Location	mi	km	Destinations	Notes
	0.00	0.00	MS 57 / MS 63 – Leakesville, Lucedale	Western terminus
	5.6	9.0	CR 96	Eastern terminus; continuation into Alabama
1.000 mi = 1.609 km; 1.000 km = 0.621 mi
