= Jackson County Sheriff's Office (Mississippi) =

Law enforcement agency responsible of providing law enforcement services

Coordinates: 30.365474°N 88.558354°W

Jackson County Sheriff's Office Patch

The Jackson County Sheriff's Office is a law enforcement agency located in Jackson County, Mississippi. It is responsible of providing law enforcement services to areas of the county that are unincorporated communities which do not have their own local police force. With over 200 officers, it is the largest law enforcement agency in Jackson County.

As of 2026 the sheriff for the Jackson County Sheriff's Office is John Ledbetter.

The county's largest city in population is Pascagoula, Mississippi.

== History ==
In 2000, Deputy Sheriff Bruce Wayne Evans was killed while on duty. The cause of death was "vehicular assault", and the assailant received a life sentence.

In October 2025, Deputy Sheriff Joshua Brashears died in a single vehicle accident on Highway 15.

On April 1 2026, Deputy Sheriff Michael Jimerson was shot and killed while responding to a call. The suspect was killed at the scene.

== Organization ==
A Patrol Car used by the Jackson County Sheriff's Department

The Jackson County Sheriff's Office provides law enforcement services to the unincorporated communities in Jackson County, Mississippi.

These communities are:

- Big Point
- Escatawpa
- Gulf Hills
- Gulf Park Estates
- Helena
- Hickory Hills
- Hurley
- Latimer
- St. Martin
- Vancleave
- Wade

=== Substations ===
1. Main Station, Pascagoula
2. Ocean Springs Substation, St. Martin
3. Hurley Substation, Hurley, Escatawpa
4. Vancleave Substation, Vancleave

== See also ==
- List of law enforcement agencies in Mississippi
