= Jake W. Lindsey =

Jake William Lindsey, Sr.
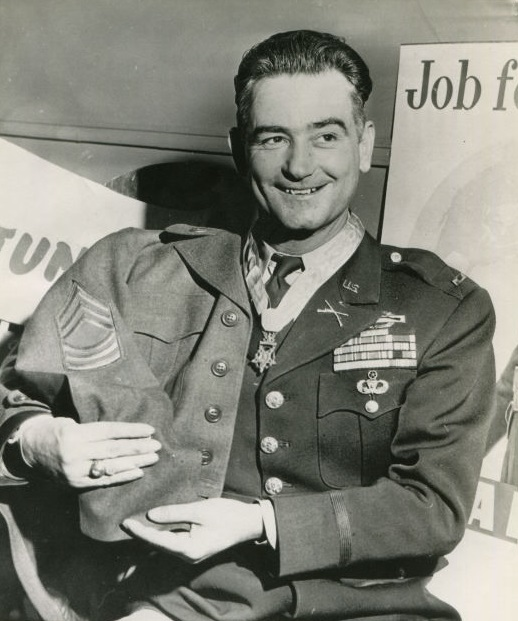
- Born: May 1, 1921; Isney, Choctaw County, Alabama, U.S.
- Died: July 18, 1988 (aged 67); Waynesboro, Mississippi, U.S.
- Burial place: Whitehouse Cemetery, Clara, Mississippi
- Military career
- Allegiance: United States
- Branch: United States Army
- Rank: 2nd Lieutenant
- Units: 16th Infantry Regiment, 1st Infantry Division
- Conflicts: World War II; Korean War
- Awards: Medal of Honor

Jake William Lindsey, Sr., (May 1, 1921 – July 18, 1988) was a United States Army soldier and a recipient of the United States military's highest decoration, the Medal of Honor, for his actions in World War II.

== Biography ==
Lindsey joined the Army from Huntington, West Virginia in February 1940 after working as a plasterer as a civilian, and by November 16, 1944 was serving as a technical sergeant in the 16th Infantry Regiment, 1st Infantry Division. On that day, near Hamich, Germany, he held a position in front of his platoon during an enemy counterattack and, although wounded, engaged a group of Germans in hand to hand combat. For these actions, he was awarded the Medal of Honor six months later.

Lindsey is unique among Medal of Honor recipients in that he personally received his medal before a joint session of Congress. President Harry Truman and General of the Army George C. Marshall presented Lindsey with his award on May 21, 1945. Footage of this ceremony is viewable on YouTube.

Lindsey later served in as a member of the postwar Doolittle Board, fought in the Korean War and left the Army while a second lieutenant. He died at age 67 and was buried in Whitehouse Cemetery, Clara, Mississippi.

== Medal of Honor citation ==
Technical Sergeant Lindsey's official Medal of Honor citation reads:

For gallantry and intrepidity at the risk of his life above and beyond the call of duty on November 16, 1944, in Germany. T/Sgt. Lindsey assumed a position about 10 yards to the front of his platoon during an intense enemy infantry-tank counterattack, and by his unerringly accurate fire destroyed 2 enemy machinegun nests, forced the withdrawal of 2 tanks, and effectively halted enemy flanking patrols. Later, although painfully wounded, he engaged 8 Germans, who were reestablishing machinegun positions, in hand-to-hand combat, killing 3, capturing 3, and causing the other 2 to flee. By his gallantry, T/Sgt. Lindsey secured his unit's position, and reflected great credit upon himself and the U.S. Army.

== Awards and decorations ==

| Badge | Combat Infantryman Badge with star denoting second award | | |
| 1st row | Medal of Honor | | Silver Star |
| 2nd row | Bronze Star Medal | Purple Heart | Army Good Conduct Medal |
| 3rd row | American Defense Service Medal | American Campaign Medal | European-African-Middle Eastern Campaign Medal with seven campaign stars |
| 4th row | World War II Victory Medal | Army of Occupation Medal with 'Germany' clasp | National Defense Service Medal |
| 5th row | Korean Service Medal with arrowhead device and at least two campaign stars | United Nations Service Medal Korea | Korean War Service Medal |
| Badge | Master Parachutists Badge with two jump stars | | |
| Unit awards | Korean Presidential Unit Citation | | |

== See also ==
- List of Medal of Honor recipients
