= Mississippi Highway 611 =

State Highway in Mississippi

Mississippi Highway 611
- Signed eastern segment in red, unsigned western segment in blue

Route information
- Maintained by MDOT and City of Pascagoula
- Length: 4.897 mi (7.881 km)
- Existed: 1962–present

Eastern segment
- Length: 4.165 mi (6.703 km)
- South end: Hardee Road in Pascagoula
- North end: US 90 / MS 63 in Pascagoula

Western segment
- Length: 0.732 mi (1,178 m)
- South end: US 90 in Pascagoula
- North end: MS 613 in Pascagoula

Location
- Country: United States
- State: Mississippi
- Counties: Jackson

Highway system
- Mississippi State Highway System; Interstate; US; State
← MS 609	→ MS 612

Mississippi Highway 611 (MS 611), also known as Industrial Road, is a 4.2-mile-long (6.8 km) north–south state highway in the southeastern corner of the city of Pascagoula, in the Mississippi Gulf Coast region of Mississippi. It serves to connect the city's main industrial park, including an oil refinery, with U.S. Highway 90 (US 90), MS 63, and the rest of the city. A second, 0.7-mile-long (1.1 km) segment also exists in central Pascagoula that is unsigned and maintained by the city.

== Route description ==
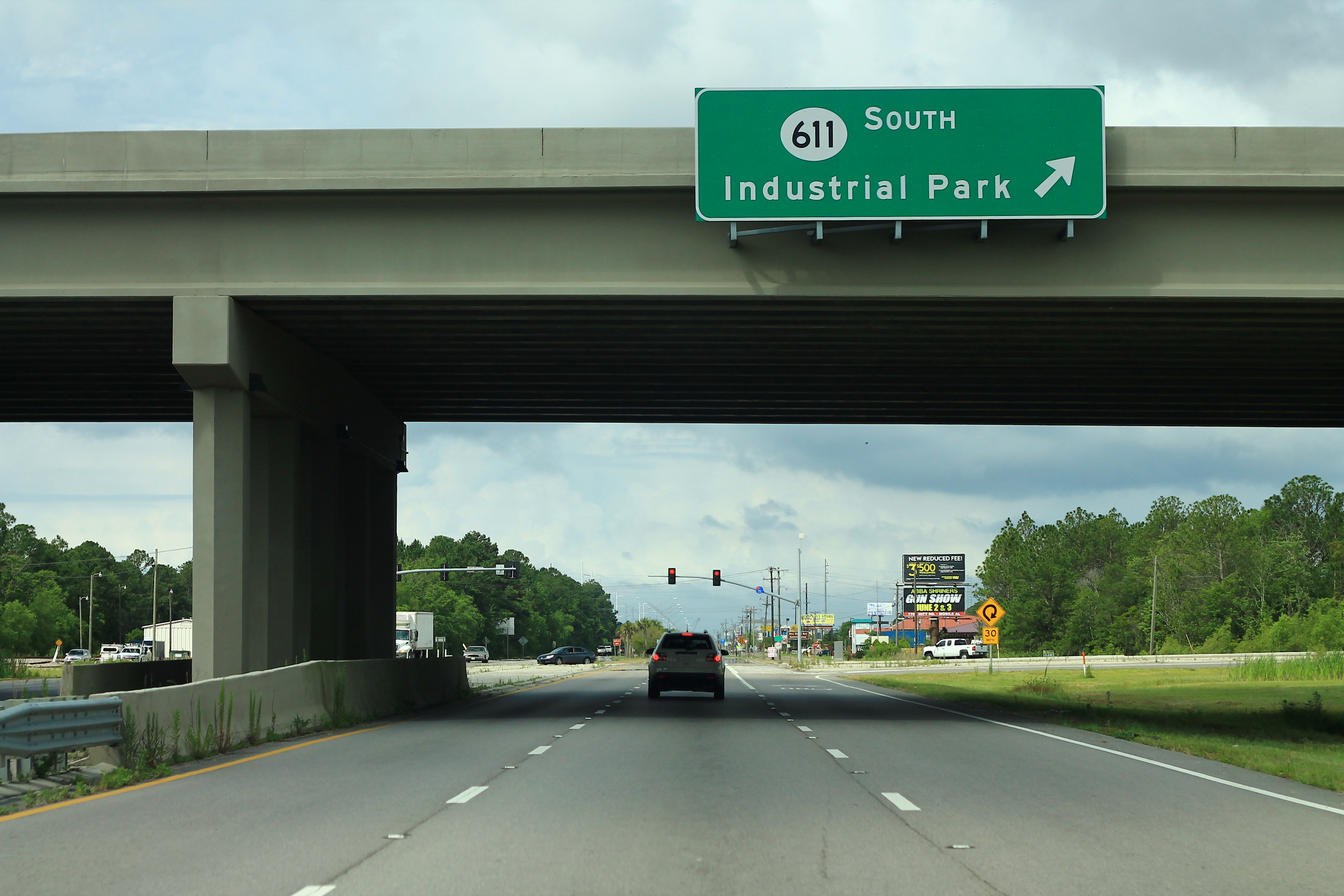
US 90 westbound at its interchange with MS 63 and MS 611

MS 611 begins at an intersection with Hardee Road near the southern end of the industrial park at a railroad overpass; Industrial Road continues south for a short distance. It heads north to pass directly beside the Chevron Pascagoula Refinery as it parallels a railroad line (while also crossing several others) past several other various businesses and the former site of the Jackson County Airport. The highway curves to the northwest for a couple miles, where it has intersections with Orchard Road and Old Mobile Avenue. MS 611 then comes to an end shortly thereafter at an interchange with US 90; the road continues north as MS 63.

The unsigned western segment of MS 611 begins at the intersection of US 90 and Chicot Street east of the city's downtown area. The highway travels northwest along Chicot Street passing various businesses. At Shortcut Road, the highway heads southwest on it passing many Jackson County offices and the county fairgrounds. After crossing Hospital Road, the road curves to the north to end at MS 613. This segment is maintained by the city.

== History ==
Mississippi Highway 611 appeared on the 1962 Official State Highway Map along its current alignment south from US 90. Industrial areas east of MS 611 and south of Old Mobile Avenue represent the site of the former Jackson County Airport.

Constructed in two phases, the US 90-Industrial Road flyover project added an overpass linking MS 611 north with MS 63 across both US 90 and the adjacent CSX Railroad. Including new ramps and the flyover, the $23 million first phase was completed in mid-February 2014. Costing $13.6 million, the second phase expanded all of Industrial Road south to five lanes. Work south of Old Mobile Highway was scheduled from March 2014 to June 2015, but continued into 2016. Prior to these projects, the entire length of MS 611 (excluding a half mile at the northern end) was a two-lane highway, with the junction between US 90, MS 63, and MS 611 being an at-grade signalized intersection.

== Major intersections ==
The entire route is in Pascagoula, Jackson County.

mi	km	Destinations	Notes
0.000	0.000	Hardee Road, Industrial Road	Southern terminus; southern end of state maintenance; road continues south as Industrial Road
4.165	6.703	US 90 – Pascagoula, Mobile MS 63 north – Moss Point, Lucedale	Northern end of eastern segment; interchange; road continues north as MS 63
Gap in route
4.165	6.703	US 90 (Denny Avenue) / Chicot Street	Southern end of western segment
4.897	7.881	MS 613 (Telephone Road) / Catalpa Avenue	Northern terminus
1.000 mi = 1.609 km; 1.000 km = 0.621 mi
