= Jackson County, Mississippi =

County in the United States

- County
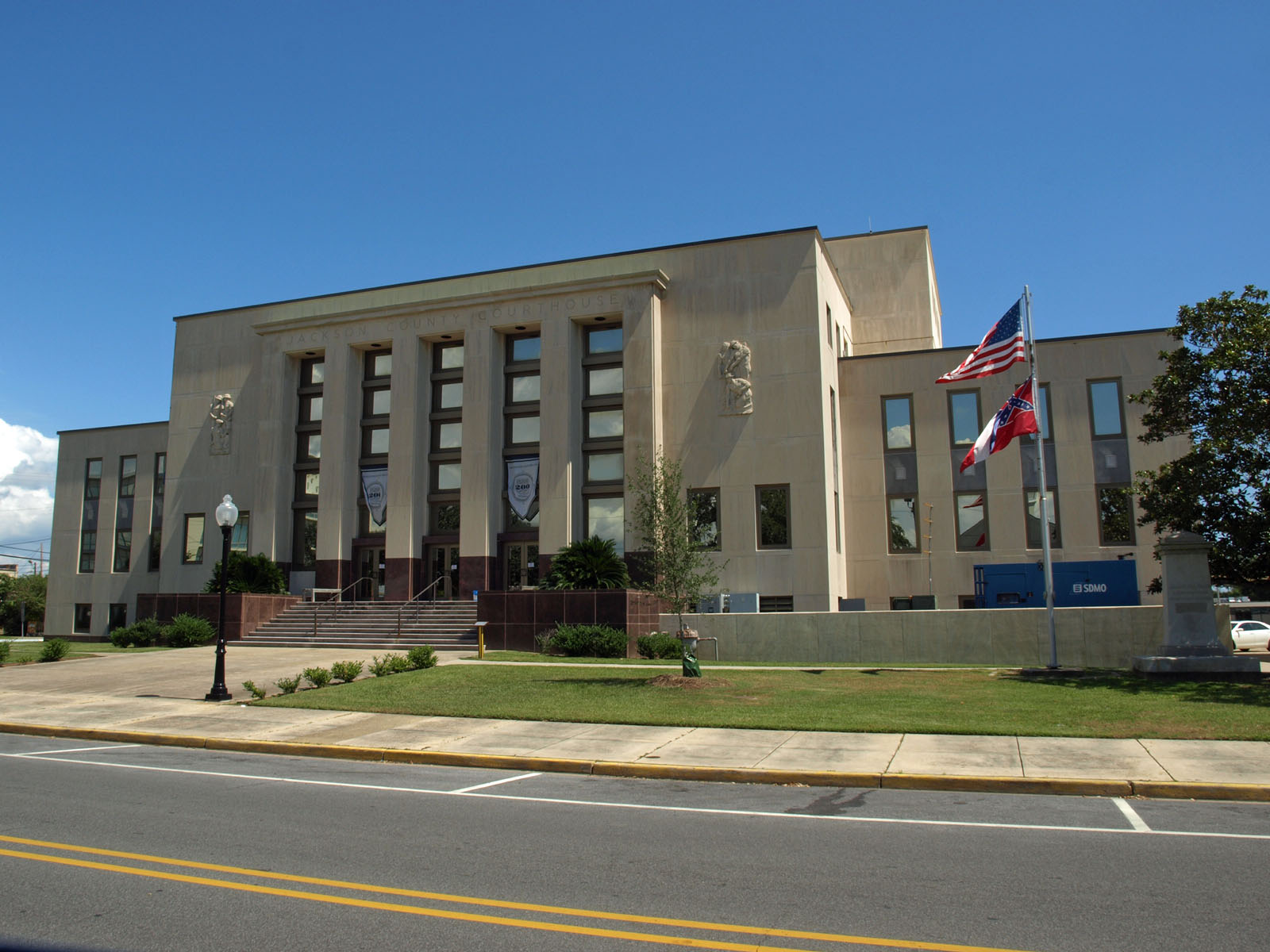
- The Jackson County Courthouse in Pascagoula

- Seal

- Location within the U.S. state of Mississippi
- Coordinates: 30°28′N 88°37′W
- Country: United States
- State: Mississippi
- Founded: 1812
- Named for: Andrew Jackson
- Seat: Pascagoula
- Largest city: Pascagoula

Area
  - Total: 1,043 sq mi (2,700 km^{2})
  - Land: 723 sq mi (1,870 km^{2})
  - Water: 321 sq mi (830 km^{2}) 31%

Population (2020)
  - Total: 143,252
  - Estimate (2025): 147,666 ▲
  - Density: 198/sq mi (76.5/km^{2})
- Time zone: UTC−6 (Central)
  - Summer (DST): UTC−5 (CDT)
- Congressional district: 4th
- Website: www.co.jackson.ms.us

Jackson County is a county located in the U.S. state of Mississippi. As of the 2020 census, the population was 143,252, making it the fifth-most populous county in Mississippi. Its county seat is Pascagoula. The county was named for Andrew Jackson, general in the United States Army and afterward President of the United States. Jackson County is included in the Pascagoula, MS Metropolitan Statistical Area. It is located at the southeastern tip of the state. The county has sandy soil and is in the Piney Woods area. It borders the state of Alabama on its east side. The county was severely damaged by both Hurricane Camille in August 1969 and Hurricane Katrina on August 29, 2005, which caused catastrophic effects.

The county bears no relation to the state capital of Jackson, which is a county seat of Hinds County, located 190 miles to the northwest of Jackson County.

== Geography ==
According to the U.S. Census Bureau, the county has a total area of 1,043 square miles (2,700 km^{2}), of which 723 square miles (1,870 km^{2}) is land and 321 square miles (830 km^{2}) (31%) is water. It is the largest county in Mississippi by total area.

=== Major highways ===
- I-10
- US 90
- MS 57
- MS 63
- MS 609
- MS 611
- MS 613
- MS 614

== Adjacent counties ==
- George County - north
- Mobile County, Alabama - east
- Harrison County - west
- Stone County - northwest

=== National protected areas ===
- De Soto National Forest (part)
- Grand Bay National Wildlife Refuge (part)
- Gulf Islands National Seashore (part)
- Mississippi Sandhill Crane National Wildlife Refuge

== Demographics ==
Historical population
Census	Pop.	Note	%±
1820	1,682		—
1830	1,792		6.5%
1840	1,965		9.7%
1850	3,196		62.6%
1860	4,122		29.0%
1870	4,362		5.8%
1880	7,607		74.4%
1890	11,251		47.9%
1900	16,513		46.8%
1910	15,451		−6.4%
1920	19,208		24.3%
1930	15,973		−16.8%
1940	20,601		29.0%
1950	31,401		52.4%
1960	55,522		76.8%
1970	87,975		58.5%
1980	118,015		34.1%
1990	115,243		−2.3%
2000	131,420		14.0%
2010	139,668		6.3%
2020	143,252		2.6%
2025 (est.)	147,666	▲	3.1%
U.S. Decennial Census; 1790-1960 1900-1990; 1990-2000 2010-2013

=== Racial and ethnic composition ===
Jackson County, Mississippi – Racial and ethnic composition Note: the US Census treats Hispanic/Latino as an ethnic category. This table excludes Latinos from the racial categories and assigns them to a separate category. Hispanics/Latinos may be of any race.
Race / Ethnicity (NH = Non-Hispanic)	Pop 1980	Pop 1990	Pop 2000	Pop 2010	Pop 2020	% 1980	% 1990	% 2000	% 2010	% 2020
White alone (NH)	93,650	89,315	97,461	97,670	92,881	79.35%	77.50%	74.16%	69.93%	64.84%
Black or African American alone (NH)	21,915	23,512	27,308	29,768	29,713	18.57%	20.40%	20.78%	21.31%	20.74%
Native American or Alaska Native alone (NH)	334	249	416	523	572	0.28%	0.22%	0.32%	0.37%	0.40%
Asian alone (NH)	522	1,087	2,033	2,991	3,173	0.44%	0.94%	1.55%	2.14%	2.21%
Native Hawaiian or Pacific Islander alone (NH)	x	x	49	68	91	x	x	0.04%	0.05%	0.06%
Other race alone (NH)	107	20	101	126	399	0.09%	0.02%	0.08%	0.09%	0.28%
Mixed race or Multiracial (NH)	x	x	1,245	2,144	6,373	x	x	0.95%	1.54%	4.45%
Hispanic or Latino (any race)	1,487	1,060	2,807	6,378	10,050	1.26%	0.92%	2.14%	4.57%	7.02%
Total	118,015	115,243	131,420	139,668	143,252	100.00%	100.00%	100.00%	100.00%	100.00%

=== 2020 census ===
As of the 2020 census, the county had a population of 143,252. The median age was 39.9 years. 23.4% of residents were under the age of 18 and 16.7% of residents were 65 years of age or older. For every 100 females there were 95.3 males, and for every 100 females age 18 and over there were 92.4 males age 18 and over.

The racial makeup of the county was 66.1% White, 21.0% Black or African American, 0.5% American Indian and Alaska Native, 2.2% Asian, 0.1% Native Hawaiian and Pacific Islander, 3.3% from some other race, and 6.7% from two or more races. Hispanic or Latino residents of any race comprised 7.0% of the population.

69.7% of residents lived in urban areas, while 30.3% lived in rural areas.

=== Households and housing ===
There were 55,677 households in the county, of which 32.8% had children under the age of 18 living in them. Of all households, 45.5% were married-couple households, 18.7% were households with a male householder and no spouse or partner present, and 29.2% were households with a female householder and no spouse or partner present. About 26.3% of all households were made up of individuals and 10.9% had someone living alone who was 65 years of age or older.

There were 62,190 housing units, of which 10.5% were vacant. Among occupied housing units, 69.3% were owner-occupied and 30.7% were renter-occupied. The homeowner vacancy rate was 1.9% and the rental vacancy rate was 13.2%.

== Choctaw people ==
Jackson County is home to the Vancleave Live Oak Choctaw, which the State of Mississippi, through House Resolution 50 (HR50), ceremonially recognized as "The Official Native American Tribe of the Choctaw People of Jackson County, Mississippi" in 2016. This legislative action acknowledges the tribe's historical and cultural significance in the state. While locally acknowledged, the tribe is not federally recognized as a Native American tribe.

== Public safety ==
The Jackson County Sheriff's Office provides law enforcement services for communities in the county that do not have their own local law enforcement. These communities are known as Census-Designated Places, or CDPs.

== Education ==
School districts in the county include:

The Jackson County School District serves the Hurley, Wade, Big Point, Three Rivers, Harleston, Vestry, Latimer, and Vancleave communities, along with St. Martin and a small portion of Escatawpa. The Pascagoula-Gautier School District serves Pascagoula and most of the City of Gautier. The Moss Point School District serves Moss Point and most of Escatawpa. The Ocean Springs School District serves Ocean Springs.

== Communities ==
=== Cities ===
- Gautier
- Moss Point
- Ocean Springs
- Pascagoula (county seat)

=== Census-designated places ===
- Big Point
- Escatawpa
- Gulf Hills
- Gulf Park Estates
- Helena
- Hurley
- Latimer
- St. Martin
- Vancleave
- Wade

=== Unincorporated places ===
- East Moss Point
- Poticaw Landing

=== Ghost towns ===
- Brewton

=== Former census-designated places ===
- Hickory Hills, merged into city of Gautier

== Politics ==
Like most of the Solid South, Jackson County consistently voted for the Democratic presidential candidate through 1960, except for 1948, when it was carried by Dixiecrat Strom Thurmond. For much of this time, Republicans were lucky to get even 1,000 votes. It voted overwhelmingly for Republican Barry Goldwater in 1964, voted for George Wallace in 1968 over Republican Richard Nixon, and has stuck with Republicans ever since. Jimmy Carter is the last Democrat to manage 40 percent of the vote.

United States presidential election results for Jackson County, Mississippi
Year	Republican		Democratic		Third party(ies)	
Year	No.	%	No.	%	No.	%
1912	14	2.28%	514	83.85%	85	13.87%
1916	87	10.21%	743	87.21%	22	2.58%
1920	121	17.24%	577	82.19%	4	0.57%
1924	158	13.50%	1,010	86.32%	2	0.17%
1928	567	31.02%	1,261	68.98%	0	0.00%
1932	126	7.12%	1,634	92.32%	10	0.56%
1936	120	6.55%	1,704	93.06%	7	0.38%
1940	171	7.43%	2,124	92.35%	5	0.22%
1944	213	7.48%	2,636	92.52%	0	0.00%
1948	238	6.41%	783	21.09%	2,692	72.50%
1952	2,170	34.36%	4,146	65.64%	0	0.00%
1956	2,692	38.98%	3,882	56.21%	332	4.81%
1960	2,266	24.70%	5,000	54.50%	1,908	20.80%
1964	11,357	82.73%	2,371	17.27%	0	0.00%
1968	2,942	14.39%	2,236	10.94%	15,261	74.67%
1972	22,204	88.68%	2,534	10.12%	300	1.20%
1976	17,177	55.26%	12,533	40.32%	1,372	4.41%
1980	22,498	62.57%	12,226	34.00%	1,234	3.43%
1984	29,585	76.79%	8,821	22.89%	123	0.32%
1988	29,830	73.90%	10,328	25.59%	206	0.51%
1992	25,321	56.36%	13,017	28.97%	6,592	14.67%
1996	24,918	59.86%	13,598	32.67%	3,109	7.47%
2000	30,068	66.66%	14,193	31.47%	846	1.88%
2004	35,134	68.82%	15,572	30.50%	343	0.67%
2008	35,993	66.29%	17,781	32.75%	522	0.96%
2012	35,747	66.62%	17,299	32.24%	609	1.14%
2016	33,629	67.85%	14,657	29.57%	1,281	2.58%
2020	36,295	66.54%	17,375	31.86%	873	1.60%
2024	36,376	69.41%	15,469	29.52%	565	1.08%

== See also ==
- National Register of Historic Places listings in Jackson County, Mississippi
- L.N. Dantzler Lumber Company
