= Glendale, Mississippi =

- Census-designated place
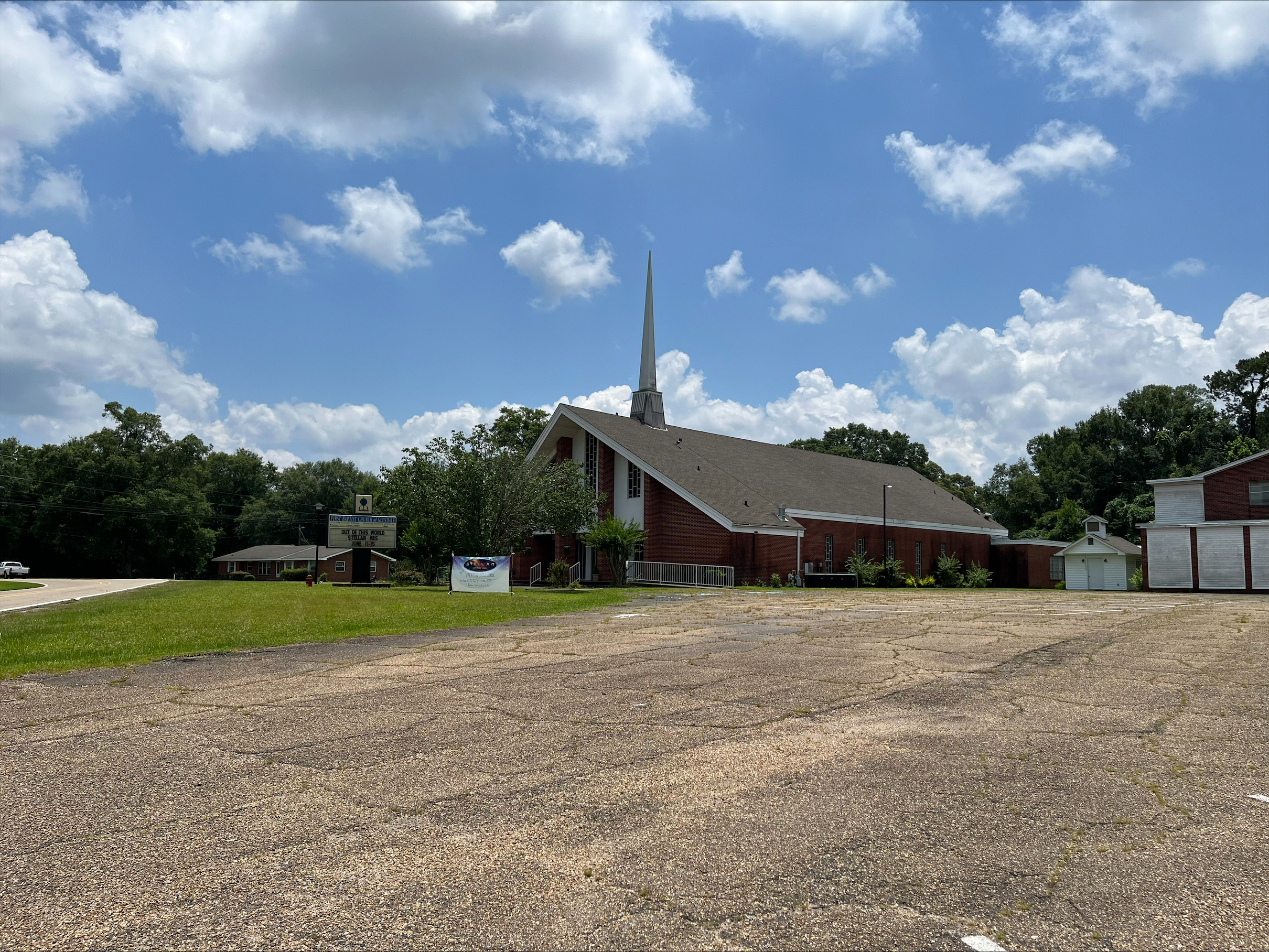
- Glendale Baptist Church

- Location within Mississippi
- Coordinates: 31°21′53″N 89°18′22″W
- Country: United States
- State: Mississippi
- County: Forrest

Area
  - Total: 1.63 sq mi (4.22 km^{2})
  - Land: 1.63 sq mi (4.22 km^{2})
  - Water: 0 sq mi (0.00 km^{2})
- Elevation: 167 ft (51 m)

Population (2020)
  - Total: 1,681
  - Density: 1,031.3/sq mi (398.17/km^{2})
- Time zone: UTC-6 (Central (CST))
  - Summer (DST): UTC-5 (CDT)
- ZIP code: 39402
- Area code: 601
- GNIS feature ID: 670431

Glendale is an unincorporated community and census-designated place (CDP) located in Forrest County, Mississippi, United States. Glendale is approximately 3.5 miles (5.6 km) north of Hattiesburg on Mississippi Highway 42 and a part of the Hattiesburg, Mississippi Metropolitan Statistical Area.

As of the 2020 census, Glendale had a population of 1,681.

== Demographics ==
Historical population
| Census | Pop. | Note | %± |
|---|---|---|---|
| 2010 | 1,657 | | — |
| 2020 | 1,681 | | 1.4% |
U.S. Decennial Census

Glendale first appeared as a census designated place in the 2010 U.S. census.

=== Racial and ethnic composition ===
Glendale CDP, Mississippi – Racial and ethnic composition Note: the US Census treats Hispanic/Latino as an ethnic category. This table excludes Latinos from the racial categories and assigns them to a separate category. Hispanics/Latinos may be of any race.
| Race / Ethnicity (NH = Non-Hispanic) | Pop 2010 | Pop 2020 | % 2010 | % 2020 |
|---|---|---|---|---|
| White alone (NH) | 656 | 538 | 39.59% | 32.00% |
| Black or African American alone (NH) | 941 | 1,013 | 56.79% | 60.26% |
| Native American or Alaska Native alone (NH) | 0 | 3 | 0.00% | 0.18% |
| Asian alone (NH) | 3 | 11 | 0.18% | 0.65% |
| Native Hawaiian or Pacific Islander alone (NH) | 0 | 1 | 0.00% | 0.06% |
| Other race alone (NH) | 1 | 0 | 0.06% | 0.00% |
| Mixed race or Multiracial (NH) | 11 | 60 | 0.66% | 3.57% |
| Hispanic or Latino (any race) | 45 | 55 | 2.72% | 3.27% |
| Total | 1,657 | 1,681 | 100.00% | 100.00% |

=== 2020 census ===
As of the 2020 census, Glendale had a population of 1,681. The median age was 41.3 years. 23.7% of residents were under the age of 18 and 17.6% of residents were 65 years of age or older. For every 100 females there were 101.3 males, and for every 100 females age 18 and over there were 96.8 males age 18 and over.

96.3% of residents lived in urban areas, while 3.7% lived in rural areas.

There were 629 households in Glendale, including 450 families. Of the households, 34.7% had children under the age of 18 living in them. Of all households, 39.7% were married-couple households, 20.2% were households with a male householder and no spouse or partner present, and 34.2% were households with a female householder and no spouse or partner present. About 26.4% of all households were made up of individuals and 12.9% had someone living alone who was 65 years of age or older.

There were 671 housing units, of which 6.3% were vacant. The homeowner vacancy rate was 0.0% and the rental vacancy rate was 9.5%.
