= Alabama State Route 56 =

State highway in Alabama, United States

State Route 56

Route information
- Maintained by ALDOT
- Length: 27.696 mi (44.572 km)
- Existed: 1940–present

Major junctions
- West end: MS 42 at the Mississippi state line near State Line, MS
- SR 17 at Chatom
- East end: US 43 at Wagarville

Location
- Country: United States
- State: Alabama
- Counties: Washington

Highway system
- Alabama State Highway System; Interstate; US; State
← SR 55	→ SR 57

The State Route 56 (SR 56) is a 27.696-mile-long (44.572 km) state highway completely within Washington County in the southwestern part of the U.S. state of Alabama. The western terminus of the highway is at the Mississippi state line at an intersection with U.S. Route 45 (US 45) and Mississippi Highway 42 (MS 42). The eastern terminus of the highway is at Wagarville, where it intersects US 43.

SR 56 was part of US 84 until 1958, when the Coffeeville Bridge opened over the Tombigbee River.

== The Highway's Importance ==
It helps society in the following ways:

How it Helps Society

- Economic Backbone: SR 56 is one of the most heavily travelled roads in Washington County, facilitating the movement of industrial products and timber, which are central to the county's manufacturing-dependent economy.
- Access to Services: The route provides residents access to the county seat, Chatom, where key community resources are located, including the Washington County Hospital and Nursing Home and the Arc of South West Alabama, which supports individuals with developmental disabilities.
- Regional Connectivity: It serves as a primary link between rural western Alabama and major north-south transit routes like US 43 and SR 17, enabling residents to reach employment hubs in nearby areas like McIntosh and Calvert.

== Route Description ==
SR 56 enters Alabama at the Mississippi state line, where Mississippi Highway 42 intersects US 45. The highway heads eastward as it approaches Chatom, the county seat of Washington County of Chatom. The highway travels through rural areas until it reaches its eastern terminus at US 43 in Wagarville. The highway is aligned along a two-lane road for its entirety.

== Major intersections ==
The entire route is in Washington County.

Location	mi	km	Destinations	Notes
	0.000	0.000	MS 42 west – State Line	Mississippi state line
Chatom	13.369	21.515	SR 17 north – Butler	West end of SR 17 concurrency
Chatom	13.418	21.594	SR 17 south – Mobile	East end of SR 17 concurrency
Wagarville	27.696	44.572	US 43 (SR 13) – Jackson, Mobile	Eastern terminus
1.000 mi = 1.609 km; 1.000 km = 0.621 mi: Concurrency terminus
