= Avera, Mississippi =

- Unincorporated community
- Location within Mississippi Location within the United States
- Coordinates: 31°17′46″N 88°44′29″W
- Country: United States
- State: Mississippi
- County: Greene
- Elevation: 322 ft (98 m)
- Time zone: UTC-6 (Central (CST))
  - Summer (DST): UTC-5 (CDT)
- GNIS feature ID: 692432

Avera is an unincorporated community in Greene County, Mississippi. Avera was originally located along the Chickasawhay River. The community was named for Powell Avera, who settled the area prior to 1860. Around 1880, the community was moved to its present location. The former location is now known as Old Avera.

Avera was once a depot on the Gulf, Mobile and Ohio Railroad. The community was once home to two general stores, a turpentine distillery, and a sawmill. At one point, the J. P. Griffin Lumber Company, the Green Lumber Company, and the Turner Lumber Company were all based in Avera.

A post office operated under the name Avera from 1882 to 1955.
