= Mississippi Highway 42 =

State Highway in Mississippi

Mississippi Highway 42

Route information
- Maintained by MDOT
- Length: 116.0 mi (186.7 km) (106.220 mi excluding concurrencies)
- Existed: 1932–present

Major junctions
- West end: Rockport-New Hebron Road near New Hebron
- US 84 in Prentiss; US 49 in Hattiesburg; I-59 in Hattiesburg; US 11 in Hattiesburg; US 45 in State Line
- East end: SR 56 at the Alabama state line in State Line

Location
- Country: United States
- State: Mississippi
- Counties: Lawrence, Jefferson Davis, Lamar, Forrest, Perry, Greene, Wayne

Highway system
- Mississippi State Highway System; Interstate; US; State
← MS 41	→ MS 43

Mississippi Highway 42 (MS 42) is a state highway in southern Mississippi. MS 42 runs in an east/west direction for 116.0 miles (186.7 km), serving seven Mississippi counties: Wayne, Greene, Perry, Forrest, Lamar, Jefferson Davis, and Lawrence. Portions of this highway run parallel to the Longleaf Trace. The length of highway between Interstate 59 and U.S. Highway 11 in Forrest County, just outside Petal is known as the Evelyn Gandy Parkway.

== Route description ==
MS 42 begins in Lawrence County at the border with Simpson County along Rockport-New Hebron Road. State maintenance begins here and MS 42 heads southeast as a two-lane highway through a mix of farmland and wooded areas for a couple miles to enter the town of New Hebron, entering town along Jones Street before making a left onto Indiana Avenue (at an intersection with unsigned MS 915). The highway passes through a neighborhood along the very northern edge of downtown, where it has an intersection with MS 43 (Franklin Street). MS 42 now leaves New Hebron and immediately enters Jefferson Davis County.

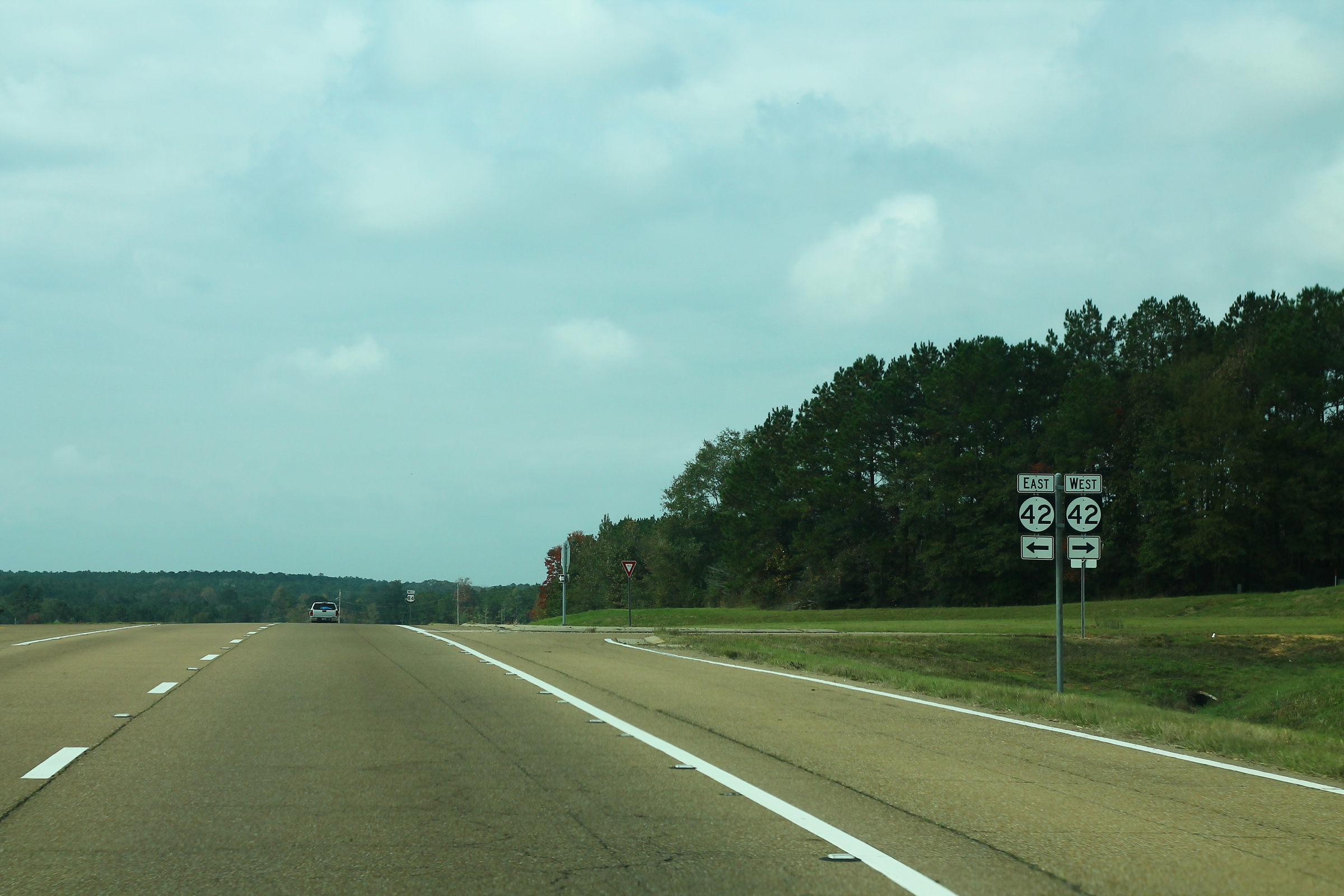
US 84 westbound at its intersection with MS 42

The highway immediately crosses a bridge over West Prong Silver Creek and it winds its way southeast through a mix of farmland and wooded areas for several miles to enter the town of Prentiss at an intersection with US 84. It heads south along 3rd Street through neighborhoods, where it passes by Prentiss Elementary School, before making a right turn onto Columbia Avenue (Original US 84) at the Jefferson Davis County Courthouse. MS 42 heads southwest through downtown for little under a mile to make a left (at an intersection with unsigned MS 937) an immediately come to an intersection with MS 184/MS 13. The highway leaves Prentiss and travels southeast through woodlands for several miles, where it passes by Jeff Davis Lake, through the community of Carson, and through the town of Bassfield (where it has an intersection with MS 35). It passes through the community of Melba before crossing into Lamar County.

MS 42 heads eastward to pass just south of the community of Higgins, where it has an intersection with MS 44, before passing straight through the town of Sumrall, bypassing downtown to the north as it has an intersection with MS 589 (Main Street). The highway heads due east to leave Sumrall and cross into Forrest County.

MS 42 becomes concurrent (overlapped) with US 49 and they head southeast as a four-lane divided highway along the western banks of the Bouie River to pass through the community of Rawls Springs before entering the Hattiesburg city limits and coming to an interchange with I-59 (Exits 67 A/B), which MS 42 splits off of US 49 and begins following, and they head north to cross the Bouie River (where they leave Hattiesburg) before MS 42 gets off at the very next exit (Exit 69) and travels a new four-lane divided highway that entirely bypasses the city of Hattiesburg, Evelyn Gandy Parkway. MS 42 passes eastward through the community of Glendale before crossing a bridge over the Leaf River to enter the neighboring city of Petal. It immediately has an interchange with US 11 before bypassing the city along its north side, where it has an intersection with Central Avenue (Old MS 42) on the east side of town. The highway passes through some neighborhoods for a couple of miles before leaving Petal, as well as the entire Hattiesburg area, and narrowing to two-lanes. It crosses into Perry County shortly thereafter.

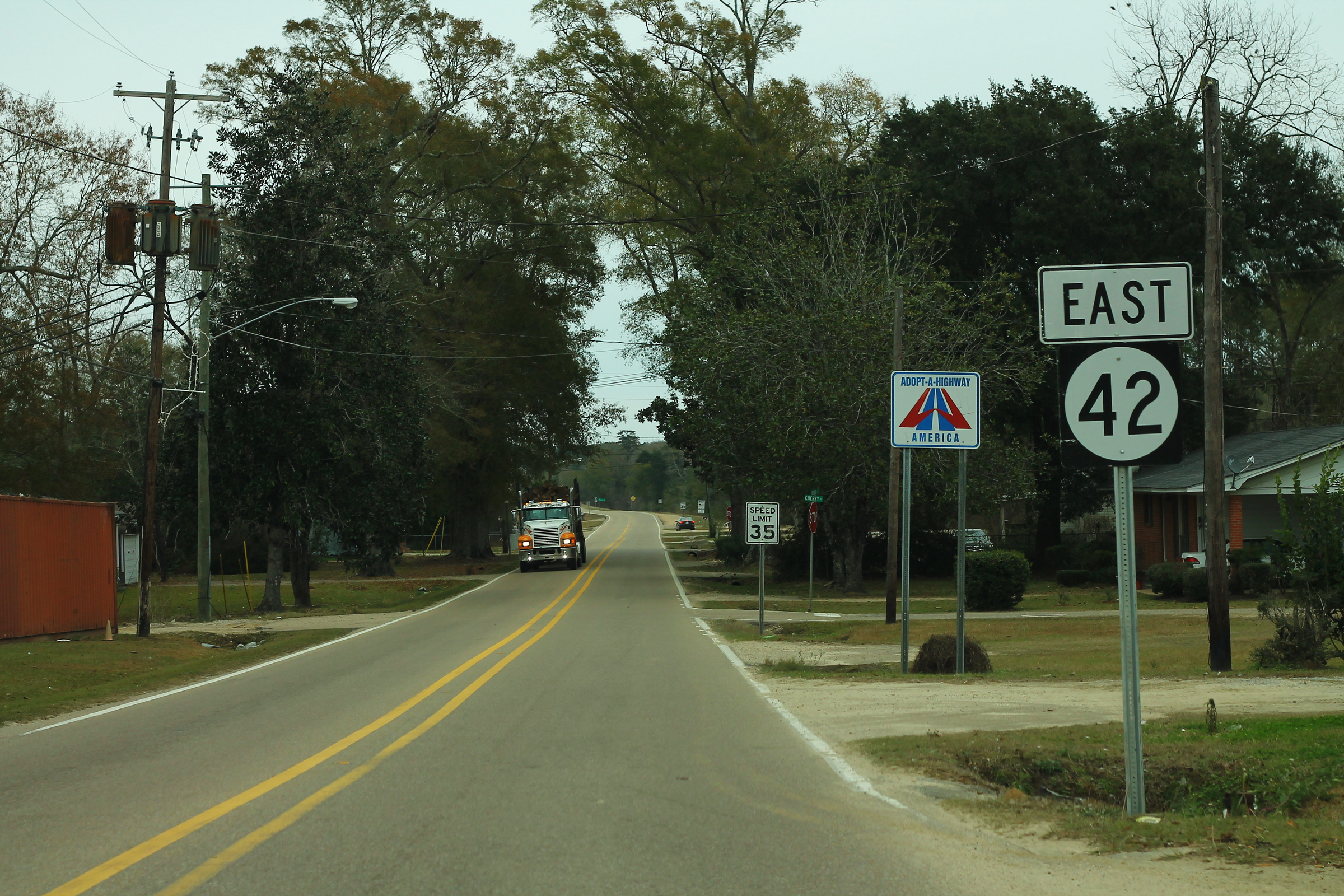
Mississippi Highway 42 eastbound passing through Richton

MS 42 crosses a bridge over Tallahala Creek to pass through the community of Runnelstown, where it has an intersection with MS 29, before traveling east through a mix of farmland and wooded areas for several miles (where it crosses a bridge over Bogue Homo) to enter the town of Richton. It passes through neighborhoods along Dogwood Avenue before entering downtown and turning north along MS 15 (Front Street). The two highways head straight up the middle of downtown for several blocks before MS 42 splits off along Redbud Avenue to leave Richton and cross the wooded marshland surrounding Thompson Creek. MS 42 passes through the community of East Side before traveling through farmland for several miles to cross into Greene County.

MS 42 continues eastward through farmland for several miles to pass through the community of Sand Hill, where it has a short concurrency with MS 63, before passing through a large woodland tract of the De Soto National Forest, where it connects to the Turkey Fork Recreation Area (via Turkey Fork Road). The highway now exits the National Forest and crosses the Chickasawhay River before entering the town of State Line, passing along the southern side of downtown along St. Peter Street before straddling the Wayne County line at an interchange with MS 57. It fully enters Wayne County and has a short concurrency with US 45 before coming to the Alabama state, with it continuing towards the town of Chatom as Alabama State Route 56 (SR 56).

== History ==
Until 2007, MS 42's route through the Hattiesburg metropolitan area was very different than it is today. This resulted from the construction of the Evelyn Gandy Parkway, a new four-lane divided expressway that entirely bypasses the city along its northern side, running from I-59 (Exit 69) to the eastern edge of Petal.

MS 42 entered the city limits from Rawls Springs, concurrent (overlapped) with US 49 as it does today, to the cloverleaf interchange with I-59 (Exits 67 A/B). That's where things change. Instead of splitting off and following the Interstate, it continued along US 49 south for several blocks through a business district before splitting off as a two-lane along what is now known as Old Highway 42. It headed east through an industrial area, where it had an intersection with Main Street (unsigned MS 967), then neighborhoods to an intersection with US 11 (Bouie Street).

The original alignment of MS 42 followed Main Street (now MS 967) directly into downtown, where it then became concurrent with US 11 north (One way pair between Pine Street and Front Street).

MS 42 became concurrent with US 11 and they headed north as a four-lane undivided highway to leave Hattiesburg and cross the Leaf River into neighboring Petal (directly beside where the Bouie River forks off). MS 42 splits off as a two-lane shortly thereafter and followed Central Avenue to cross some railroad tracks and pass directly through downtown. Central Avenue/Old Highway 42 rejoins the current alignment (Evelyn Gandy Parkway) at the eastern end of town.

== Major intersections ==
County	Location	mi	km	Destinations	Notes
Lawrence		0.0	0.0	Rockport-New Hebron Road	West end of state maintenance (Simpson County line)
Lawrence	New Hebron	3.4	5.5	Jones Street (MS 915 south)	Northern terminus of unsigned MS 915
Lawrence	New Hebron	3.7	6.0	MS 43 – Pinola, Silver Creek	
Jefferson Davis		15.9	25.6	US 84 – Collins, Monticello	
Jefferson Davis	Prentiss	17.8	28.6	Columbia Avenue (MS 937 south)	Northern terminus of unsigned MS 937
Jefferson Davis	Prentiss	17.9	28.8	MS 13 / MS 184 – Collins, Monticello	
Jefferson Davis		20.3	32.7	Ed Parkman Road – Jeff Davis Lake	
Jefferson Davis	Bassfield	27.5	44.3	MS 35 – Mount Olive, Columbia	
Lamar		40.1	64.5	MS 44 west – Columbia	West end of MS 44 overlap
Lamar	Sumrall	42.2	67.9	MS 589 – Downtown Sumrall	East end of MS 44 overlap
Forrest		50.2	80.8	US 49 north – Jackson	West end of US 49 overlap
Forrest	Hattiesburg	56.0	90.1	I-59 south / US 49 south – New Orleans, Mississippi Gulf Coast, Hattiesburg, University of Southern Mississippi	East end of US 49 overlap; west end of I-59 overlap; MS 42 west follows exit 67B
Forrest		58.0	93.3	I-59 north / Eatonville Road – Laurel, Eatonville	East end of I-59 overlap; MS 42 east follows exit 69
Forrest	Petal	61.6	99.1	US 11 – Hattiesburg, Laurel	Interchange
Forrest	Petal	64.2	103.3	Central Avenue	Old MS 42 west through downtown Petal and downtown Hattiesburg; former MS 142
Perry	Runnelstown	71.8	115.6	MS 29 – Ellisville, New Augusta	
Perry	Richton	82.6	132.9	MS 15 south – Beaumont	West end of MS 15 overlap
Perry	Richton	83.0	133.6	MS 15 north – Laurel	East end of MS 15 overlap
Greene	Sand Hill	94.0	151.3	MS 63 south – Leakesville	West end of MS 63 overlap
Greene		94.6	152.2	MS 63 north – Waynesboro	East end of MS 63 overlap
Greene	De Soto National Forest	95.9	154.3	Turkey Fork Road – Turkey Fork Recreation Area	Access road into park
Greene	State Line	113.3	182.3	To MS 57 / Main Street	Former MS 57
Wayne	State Line	113.7– 113.9	183.0– 183.3	MS 57 – Waynesboro, Mississippi Gulf Coast	Interchange
Wayne		114.5	184.3	US 45 south – Citronelle, Mobile	West end of US 45 overlap
Wayne	State Line	115.3	185.6	US 45 north – Waynesboro, State Line	East end of US 45 overlap
Wayne		116.0	186.7	SR 56 east – Chatom	Alabama state line; eastern terminus
1.000 mi = 1.609 km; 1.000 km = 0.621 mi: Concurrency terminus
