= Greene County, Mississippi =

County in Mississippi, United States

- County
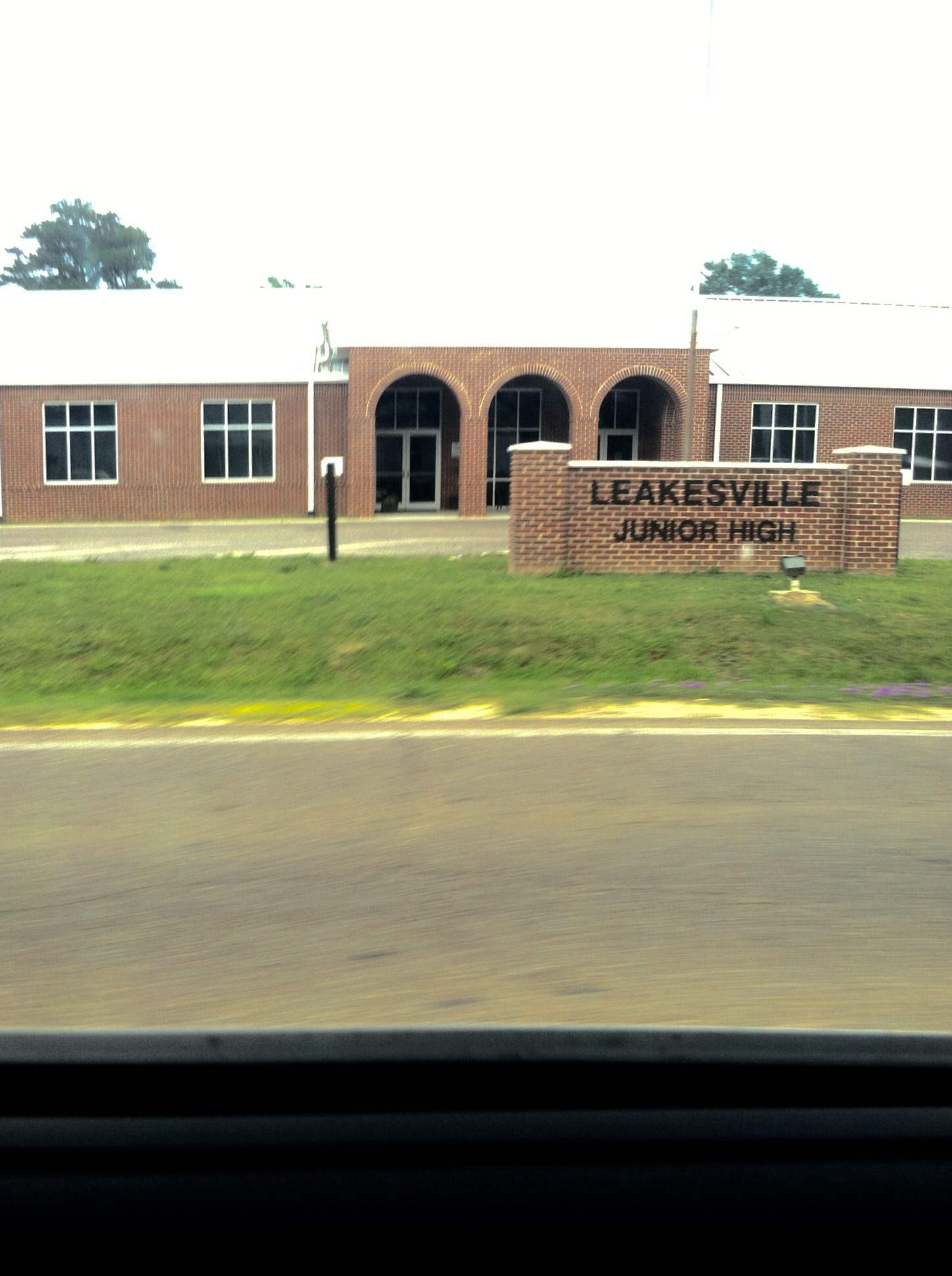
- Leaksville Junior High School

- Location within the U.S. state of Mississippi
- Coordinates: 31°13′N 88°38′W
- Country: United States
- State: Mississippi
- Founded: 1811
- Named for: Nathanael Greene
- Seat: Leakesville
- Largest town: Leakesville

Area
  - Total: 719 sq mi (1,860 km^{2})
  - Land: 713 sq mi (1,850 km^{2})
  - Water: 5.9 sq mi (15 km^{2}) 0.8%

Population (2020)
  - Total: 13,530
  - Estimate (2025): 13,707 ▲
  - Density: 19.0/sq mi (7.33/km^{2})
- Time zone: UTC−6 (Central)
  - Summer (DST): UTC−5 (CDT)
- Congressional district: 4th
- Website: www.greenecountyms.gov

Greene County is a county located on the southeast border of the U.S. state of Mississippi. As of the 2020 census, the population was 13,530. Its county seat is Leakesville. Established in 1811, the county was named for General Nathanael Greene of the American Revolutionary War.

== History ==
Historically this area of the state was occupied by the Choctaw people, who constituted the largest tribe. French, Spanish and English colonists traded with them in the early colonial years. in 1830, President Andrew Jackson gained passage of the Indian Removal Act by Congress, and proceeded to force the Choctaw and other of the Five Civilized Tribes out of the Southeast to lands west of the Mississippi River. The land was sold to European-American settlers.

County boundaries went through numerous changes as population increased and new counties were created. Along with neighboring Jones and Perry counties, Greene is characterized by its sandy soil and Piney Woods. These characteristics limited the productivity of farming.

The county economy originally depended on subsistence farmers who ran herds of cattle and hogs, which were allowed to roam freely in the pine forests and bush. Together with the game they hunted, residents sold the meat animals to markets in Mobile, Alabama, the nearest commercial center. While some farmers tried to cultivate cotton because of the high prices when the market was strong, most in this area had small farms and the owners held few enslaved African Americans. The soil did not support very successful cotton crops; in 1860 only 16 of the 213 farmers in this county raised cotton.

== Geography ==
According to the U.S. Census Bureau, the county has a total area of 719 square miles (1,860 km^{2}), of which 713 square miles (1,850 km^{2}) is land and 5.9 square miles (15 km^{2}) (0.8%) is water.

=== Major highways ===
- U.S. Highway 45
- U.S. Highway 98
- Mississippi Highway 42
- Mississippi Highway 57
- Mississippi Highway 63

=== Adjacent counties ===
- Wayne County (north)
- Washington County, Alabama (northeast)
- Mobile County, Alabama (southeast)
- George County (south)
- Perry County (west)

=== National protected area ===
- De Soto National Forest (part)

== Demographics ==
The rural county had strong declines in population from 1940 to 1960, a period when many African Americans left for the West Coast in the second wave of the Great Migration. The buildup of defense industries in California and other states before and during World War II attracted many migrants for work opportunities.

Historical population
Census	Pop.	Note	%±
1820	1,345		—
1830	1,854		37.8%
1840	1,636		−11.8%
1850	2,018		23.3%
1860	2,232		10.6%
1870	2,038		−8.7%
1880	3,194		56.7%
1890	3,906		22.3%
1900	6,795		74.0%
1910	6,050		−11.0%
1920	10,430		72.4%
1930	10,644		2.1%
1940	9,512		−10.6%
1950	8,215		−13.6%
1960	8,366		1.8%
1970	8,545		2.1%
1980	9,827		15.0%
1990	10,220		4.0%
2000	13,299		30.1%
2010	14,400		8.3%
2020	13,530		−6.0%
2025 (est.)	13,707	▲	1.3%
U.S. Decennial Census; 1790-1960 1900-1990; 1990-2000 2010-2013

=== Racial and ethnic composition ===
Greene County, Mississippi – Racial and ethnic composition Note: the US Census treats Hispanic/Latino as an ethnic category. This table excludes Latinos from the racial categories and assigns them to a separate category. Hispanics/Latinos may be of any race.
Race / Ethnicity (NH = Non-Hispanic)	Pop 1980	Pop 1990	Pop 2000	Pop 2010	Pop 2020	% 1980	% 1990	% 2000	% 2010	% 2020
White alone (NH)	7,771	7,954	9,637	10,363	9,809	79.08%	77.83%	72.46%	71.97%	72.50%
Black or African American alone (NH)	1,931	2,185	3,467	3,735	3,143	19.65%	21.38%	26.07%	25.94%	23.23%
Native American or Alaska Native alone (NH)	9	10	30	40	60	0.09%	0.10%	0.23%	0.28%	0.44%
Asian alone (NH)	3	6	8	19	21	0.03%	0.06%	0.06%	0.13%	0.16%
Native Hawaiian or Pacific Islander alone (NH)	x	x	4	1	3	x	x	0.03%	0.01%	0.02%
Other race alone (NH)	1	0	1	2	11	0.01%	0.00%	0.01%	0.01%	0.08%
Mixed race or Multiracial (NH)	x	x	46	107	312	x	x	0.35%	0.74%	2.31%
Hispanic or Latino (any race)	112	65	106	133	171	1.14%	0.64%	0.80%	0.92%	1.26%
Total	9,827	10,220	13,299	14,400	13,530	100.00%	100.00%	100.00%	100.00%	100.00%

=== 2020 census ===
As of the 2020 census, the county had a population of 13,530. The median age was 40.3 years. 20.0% of residents were under the age of 18 and 15.1% of residents were 65 years of age or older. For every 100 females there were 140.4 males, and for every 100 females age 18 and over there were 154.2 males age 18 and over.

The racial makeup of the county was 72.8% White, 23.3% Black or African American, 0.5% American Indian and Alaska Native, 0.2% Asian, <0.1% Native Hawaiian and Pacific Islander, 0.6% from some other race, and 2.7% from two or more races. Hispanic or Latino residents of any race comprised 1.3% of the population.

Less than 0.1% of residents lived in urban areas, while 100.0% lived in rural areas.

There were 4,256 households in the county, of which 32.3% had children under the age of 18 living in them. Of all households, 51.6% were married-couple households, 17.8% were households with a male householder and no spouse or partner present, and 25.9% were households with a female householder and no spouse or partner present. About 26.8% of all households were made up of individuals and 11.8% had someone living alone who was 65 years of age or older.

There were 5,104 housing units, of which 16.6% were vacant. Among occupied housing units, 83.6% were owner-occupied and 16.4% were renter-occupied. The homeowner vacancy rate was 1.4% and the rental vacancy rate was 10.7%.

=== 2000 census ===
As of the census of 2000, there were 13,299 people, 4,148 households, and 3,152 families residing in the county. The population density was 19 people per square mile (7.3 people/km^{2}). There were 4,947 housing units at an average density of 7 units per square mile (2.7 units/km^{2}). The racial makeup of the county was 72.79% White, 26.18% Black or African American, 0.23% Native American, 0.07% Asian, 0.03% Pacific Islander, 0.31% from other races, and 0.38% from two or more races. 0.80% of the population were Hispanic or Latino of any race.

There were 4,148 households, out of which 37.20% had children under the age of 18 living with them, 61.20% were married couples living together, 11.90% had a female householder with no husband present, and 24.00% were non-families. 22.00% of all households were made up of individuals, and 9.30% had someone living alone who was 65 years of age or older. The average household size was 2.67 and the average family size was 3.12.

In the county, the population was spread out, with 24.10% under the age of 18, 13.10% from 18 to 24, 32.10% from 25 to 44, 20.60% from 45 to 64, and 10.10% who were 65 years of age or older. The median age was 32 years. For every 100 females there were 130.00 males. For every 100 females age 18 and over, there were 141.00 males.

The median income for a household in the county was $28,336, and the median income for a family was $33,037. Males had a median income of $30,189 versus $17,935 for females. The per capita income for the county was $11,868. About 16.50% of families and 19.60% of the population were below the poverty line, including 25.30% of those under age 18 and 21.10% of those age 65 or over.

== Government and infrastructure ==
The Mississippi Department of Corrections South Mississippi Correctional Institution is located in an unincorporated area of Greene County; it has a Leakesville postal address. It opened in 1990. In the early 21st century, it has an inmate population of more than 3,000 men, which has added markedly to the total population of the county. Its inmates constitute approximately 21 percent of the state's total prisoners. Numerous residents of the rural county are employed at the prison.

Greene County has, since the 1970s, been a solid Republican stronghold. The last Democratic presidential candidate to carry the county was Jimmy Carter in 1976.

United States presidential election results for Greene County, Mississippi
Year	Republican		Democratic		Third party(ies)	
Year	No.	%	No.	%	No.	%
1912	13	4.18%	268	86.17%	30	9.65%
1916	32	7.36%	399	91.72%	4	0.92%
1920	24	6.59%	337	92.58%	3	0.82%
1924	31	6.37%	456	93.63%	0	0.00%
1928	342	36.58%	593	63.42%	0	0.00%
1932	29	3.42%	818	96.46%	1	0.12%
1936	46	5.23%	830	94.43%	3	0.34%
1940	66	6.65%	926	93.35%	0	0.00%
1944	109	10.73%	907	89.27%	0	0.00%
1948	14	1.38%	118	11.59%	886	87.03%
1952	506	28.86%	1,247	71.14%	0	0.00%
1956	351	28.56%	734	59.72%	144	11.72%
1960	247	15.65%	550	34.85%	781	49.49%
1964	1,845	89.52%	216	10.48%	0	0.00%
1968	132	3.97%	449	13.50%	2,744	82.53%
1972	2,884	83.52%	513	14.86%	56	1.62%
1976	1,538	40.80%	2,127	56.42%	105	2.79%
1980	1,772	50.04%	1,740	49.14%	29	0.82%
1984	2,744	67.55%	1,297	31.93%	21	0.52%
1988	2,837	57.08%	1,637	32.94%	496	9.98%
1992	2,406	51.90%	1,664	35.89%	566	12.21%
1996	1,947	53.71%	1,347	37.16%	331	9.13%
2000	3,082	69.48%	1,317	29.69%	37	0.83%
2004	3,850	72.66%	1,421	26.82%	28	0.53%
2008	4,361	75.33%	1,366	23.60%	62	1.07%
2012	4,531	76.51%	1,325	22.37%	66	1.11%
2016	4,335	80.74%	974	18.14%	60	1.12%
2020	4,794	82.48%	966	16.62%	52	0.89%
2024	4,776	84.55%	835	14.78%	38	0.67%

== Communities ==
=== Towns ===
- Leakesville (county seat)
- McLain
- State Line (partly in Wayne County)

=== Census-designated places ===
- Leaf

=== Unincorporated communities ===
- Avera
- Neely
- Piave
- Sand Hill
- Vernal

== Education ==
Greene County School District is the only school district.

The Greene County School District includes: Greene County High School, Greene County Vocational-Technical School, Leakesville Elementary School, Leakesville Junior High School, McLain Attendance Center, and Sand Hill Attendance Center.

The county is in the zone for Jones College.

== See also ==
- National Register of Historic Places listings in Greene County, Mississippi
