= Neely, Mississippi =

- Unincorporated community
- Location within Mississippi Location within the United States
- Coordinates: 31°09′54″N 88°45′17″W
- Country: United States
- State: Mississippi
- County: Greene
- Elevation: 223 ft (68 m)
- Time zone: UTC-6 (Central (CST))
  - Summer (DST): UTC-5 (CDT)
- ZIP code: 39461
- Area codes: 601 & 769
- GNIS feature ID: 694151

Neely is an unincorporated community in Greene County, Mississippi, United States. Its ZIP code is 39461.

Originally known as Washington, the town was renamed for C.J. Neely, the first postmaster. Neely was a stop on the Gulf, Mobile & Northern Railroad, which later became the Illinois Central Railroad.

A post office first began operation under the name Neely in 1907 from 1882 to 1955.

Ed Freeman, a U.S. Army helicopter pilot awarded the Medal of Honor for his actions in the Battle of Ia Drang during the Vietnam War, was born in Neely.
