= Piave, Mississippi =

- Unincorporated community
- Location within Mississippi Location within the United States
- Coordinates: 31°23′40″N 88°44′41″W
- Country: United States
- State: Mississippi
- County: Greene
- Elevation: 272 ft (83 m)
- Time zone: UTC-6 (Central (CST))
  - Summer (DST): UTC-5 (CDT)
- GNIS feature ID: 694361

Piave is an unincorporated community in Greene County, Mississippi.

Piave is located on the former Gulf, Mobile and Ohio Railroad. The community was named for the Piave Mill Company, which in turn was named for its founder, Henry Piaggio. Piaggio was president of the International Shipbuilding Company, which operated a shipyard in Pascagoula. Lumber from the Piave Mill Company was transported to Pascagoula to build ships for the Italian government. The Piave Mill Company was sold in 1920 and renamed the Virgin Pine Lumber Company. At one time, Piave was home to three general stores, two hotels, dentist office, ice plant, and the Piave High School.

A post office operated under the name Piave from 1919 to 1958.
