= Hickory Hills, Mississippi =

- Former CDP
- Location of Hickory Hills, Mississippi

- Location in the United States
- Coordinates: 30°27′18″N 88°38′26″W
- Country: United States
- State: Mississippi
- County: Jackson

Area
  - Total: 5.7 sq mi (14.8 km^{2})
  - Land: 5.4 sq mi (13.9 km^{2})
  - Water: 0.35 sq mi (0.9 km^{2})
- Elevation: 20 ft (6 m)

Population (2000)
  - Total: 3,046
  - Density: 567/sq mi (219.1/km^{2})
- Time zone: UTC-6 (Central (CST))
  - Summer (DST): UTC-5 (CDT)
- FIPS code: 28-32082
- GNIS feature ID: 1852587

Hickory Hill is a neighborhood in the city of Gautier in Jackson County, Mississippi, United States. Prior to 2010 it was an unincorporated area and recorded as a census-designated place, with a population of 3,046 at the 2000 census. At the 2010 census its population was included in the data for the city of Gautier. It is part of the Pascagoula Metropolitan Statistical Area.

== Geography ==
Hickory Hills is located in the northern part of the city of Gautier at 30°27′18″N 88°38′26″W (30.454907, -88.640579), north of Interstate 10, with access from Exit 61. It is 8 miles (13 km) by road north of the center of Gautier, 12 miles (19 km) northwest of Pascagoula, the county seat, and 19 miles (31 km) northeast of Biloxi.

== Demographics ==
As of the census of 2000, there were 3,046 people, 1,085 households, and 848 families residing in the CDP. The population density was 567.4 inhabitants per square mile (219.1/km^{2}). There were 1,263 housing units at an average density of 235.3 per square mile (90.8/km^{2}). The racial makeup of the CDP was 82.11% White, 14.31% African American, 0.56% Native American, 0.49% Asian, 0.82% from other races, and 1.71% from two or more races. Hispanic or Latino of any race were 2.50% of the population.

There were 1,085 households, out of which 40.1% had children under the age of 18 living with them, 60.6% were married couples living together, 12.2% had a female householder with no husband present, and 21.8% were non-families. 17.0% of all households were made up of individuals, and 4.6% had someone living alone who was 65 years of age or older. The average household size was 2.80 and the average family size was 3.12.

In the CDP, the population was spread out, with 29.3% under the age of 18, 8.9% from 18 to 24, 31.6% from 25 to 44, 23.0% from 45 to 64, and 7.3% who were 65 years of age or older. The median age was 33 years. For every 100 females, there were 102.9 males. For every 100 females age 18 and over, there were 98.7 males.

The median income for a household in the CDP was $44,479, and the median income for a family was $49,719. Males had a median income of $35,385 versus $25,733 for females. The per capita income for the CDP was $19,714. About 12.9% of families and 17.8% of the population were below the poverty line, including 27.5% of those under age 18 and 9.0% of those age 65 or over.

== Education ==
Hickory Hills is served by the Pascagoula-Gautier School District. It includes one elementary school, one middle school, and one high school. Students in Hickory Hills attend schools in Gautier.

=== Elementary school ===
- Martin Bluff Elementary School

=== Middle school ===
- Gautier Middle School

=== High school ===
- Gautier High School
