= Battle of Piave River =

Battle of Piave River may refer to:

- Battle of Piave River (1809)
- First Battle of the Piave River, November 1917
- Second Battle of the Piave River, June 1918
- Battle of Vittorio Veneto, October 1918
