= Leaf, Mississippi =

- Census-designated place
- Location within Mississippi Location within the United States
- Coordinates: 31°01′33″N 88°47′44″W
- Country: United States
- State: Mississippi
- County: Greene

Area
  - Total: 1.18 sq mi (3.06 km^{2})
  - Land: 1.18 sq mi (3.06 km^{2})
  - Water: 0 sq mi (0.00 km^{2})
- Elevation: 95 ft (29 m)

Population (2020)
  - Total: 62
  - Density: 52.6/sq mi (20.29/km^{2})
- Time zone: UTC-6 (Central (CST))
  - Summer (DST): UTC-5 (CDT)
- ZIP code: 39456
- GNIS feature ID: 693696

Leaf is a census-designated place and unincorporated community in Greene County, Mississippi, United States.

Leaf is located east of Leaf River Wildlife Management Area, within the eastern boundary of De Soto National Forest.

The town is named for the Leaf River, which flows a few miles east.

Per the 2020 Census, the population was 62.

== History ==
Leaf was settled in 1838, and originally called "Salem". Most of the early settlers in the region were Irish, Scottish or English, and Salem's first families were the Thomsons, Cowarts, McKays, and McLeods.

Salem Academy was founded by W.W. Thompson, and operated between 1845 and 1862. Thompson later served as a Superintendent of Education of Greene County.

Leaf was a stop on the Mobile, Jackson and Kansas City Railroad, which later became the Illinois Central Railroad.

In 1902, three partners bought two sawmills in Leaf, as well as carts, oxen and wagons, and opened the Thomson Brothers Lumber Company. The mills had a total cutting capacity of 50,000 ft (15,000 m) per day, and produced longleaf yellow pine timber and lumber, dressed and rough. In 1903, the company sold the sawmills and nearly 1,600 acres (650 ha) of timber, to William F. Green of Bay Minette, Alabama. Green operated the mill under the named W.F. Green Lumber Company. The sawmill was destroyed by fire in 1906, at a loss of $20,000. The mill was rebuilt, but its operations ceased in 1909 when W.F. Green moved to Hattiesburg, Mississippi.

A post office operated under the name Leaf from 1874 to 1986.

== Demographics ==
Historical population
Census	Pop.	Note	%±
2020	62		—
U.S. Decennial Census; 2020

Leaf was first listed as a census designated place in the 2020 U.S. census.

=== 2020 census ===
Leaf CDP, Mississippi – Racial and ethnic composition Note: the US Census treats Hispanic/Latino as an ethnic category. This table excludes Latinos from the racial categories and assigns them to a separate category. Hispanics/Latinos may be of any race.
Race / Ethnicity (NH = Non-Hispanic)	Pop 2020	% 2020
White alone (NH)	60	96.77%
Black or African American alone (NH)	0	0.00%
Native American or Alaska Native alone (NH)	0	0.00%
Asian alone (NH)	0	0.00%
Native Hawaiian or Pacific Islander alone (NH)	0	0.00%
Other race alone (NH)	0	0.00%
Mixed race or Multiracial (NH)	0	0.00%
Hispanic or Latino (any race)	2	3.23%
Total	62	100.00%

== Notable people ==
- Lloyd Green, steel guitarist.
