= Sand Hill, Greene County, Mississippi =

Sand Hill, Mississippi
- Unincorporated community
- Location within Mississippi Location within the United States
- Coordinates: 31°21′N 88°46′W
- Country: United States
- State: Mississippi
- County: Greene
- Elevation: 315 ft (96 m)
- Time zone: UTC-6 (Central (CST))
  - Summer (DST): UTC-5 (CDT)
- Area codes: 601 & 769
- GNIS feature ID: 677340

Sand Hill is an unincorporated community in Greene County, Mississippi, United States. Sand Hill is located at the junction of Mississippi Highway 42 and Mississippi Highway 63 18 miles (29 km) northwest of Leakesville.
