= Latimer, Mississippi =

- Census-designated place
- Location of Latimer, Mississippi

- Location in the United States
- Coordinates: 30°29′2″N 88°51′34″W
- Country: United States
- State: Mississippi
- County: Jackson

Area
  - Total: 16.29 sq mi (42.18 km^{2})
  - Land: 16.28 sq mi (42.17 km^{2})
  - Water: 0 sq mi (0.00 km^{2})
- Elevation: 72 ft (22 m)

Population (2020)
  - Total: 6,720
  - Density: 412.7/sq mi (159.35/km^{2})
- Time zone: UTC-6 (Central (CST))
  - Summer (DST): UTC-5 (CDT)
- ZIP code: 39564
- Area code: 228
- FIPS code: 28-39520
- GNIS feature ID: 0705437

Latimer is a census-designated place (CDP) in Jackson County, Mississippi, United States. It is part of the Pascagoula Metropolitan Statistical Area. As of the 2020 census, Latimer had a population of 6,720.

== Geography ==
Latimer is in western Jackson County, bordered to the west by D'Iberville in Harrison County and to the south by St. Martin. Interstate 10 forms the southern boundary of the community, with access from Exit 50. Latimer is 11 miles (18 km) north of Biloxi and 27 miles (43 km) northwest of Pascagoula, the Jackson county seat. The northern, less-populated half of the Latimer CDP lies within De Soto National Forest.

According to the United States Census Bureau, the CDP has a total area of 16.3 square miles (42.3 km^{2}), of which 0.7 acres (3,028 m^{2}), or 0.01%, are water.

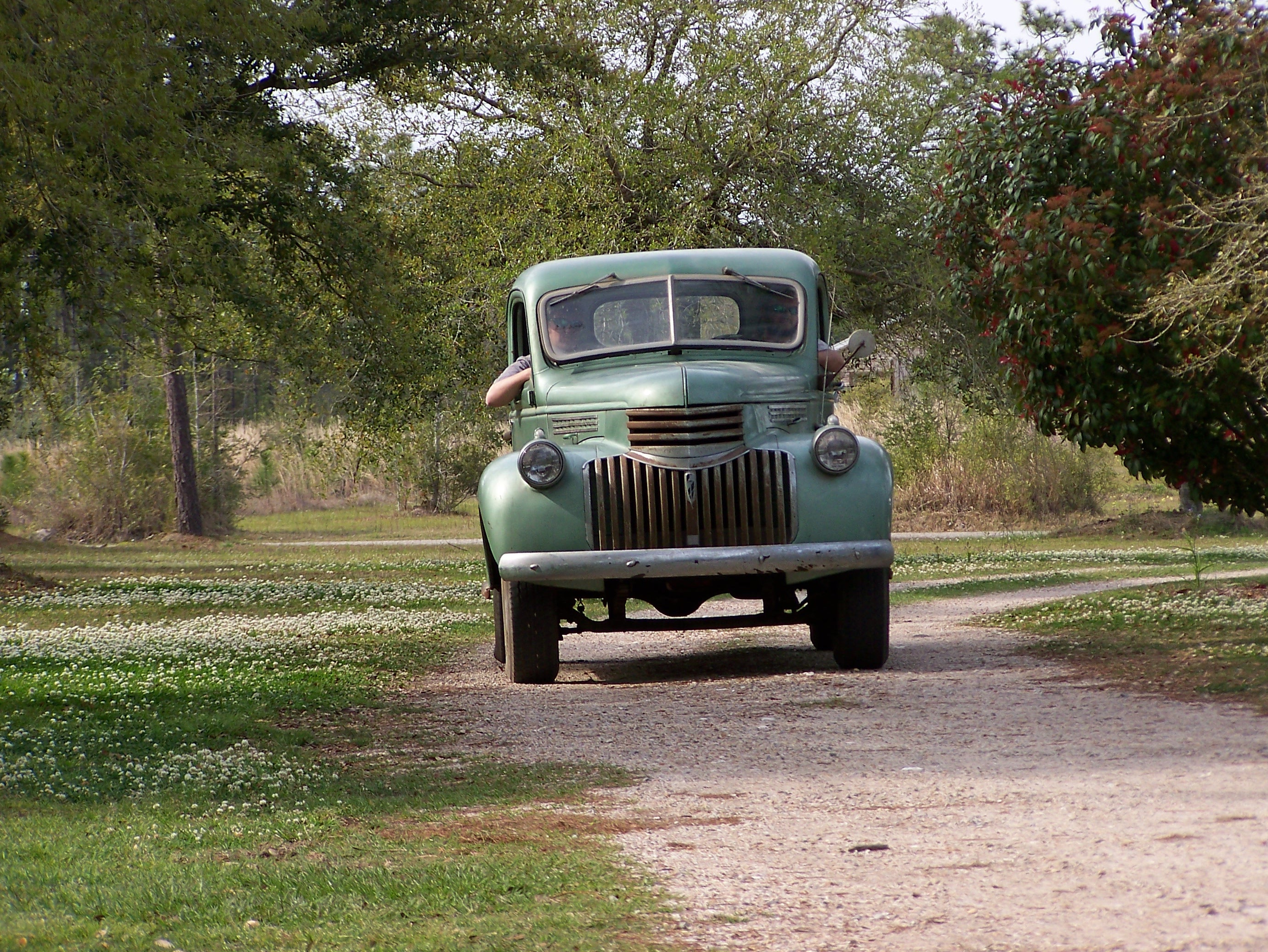
Latimer

== Demographics ==
Historical population
Census	Pop.	Note	%±
2000	4,288		—
2010	6,079		41.8%
2020	6,720		10.5%
U.S. Decennial Census

=== 2020 census ===
As of the 2020 census, Latimer had a population of 6,720. The median age was 38.4 years. 24.2% of residents were under the age of 18 and 13.3% of residents were 65 years of age or older. For every 100 females there were 97.1 males, and for every 100 females age 18 and over there were 96.1 males age 18 and over.

42.9% of residents lived in urban areas, while 57.1% lived in rural areas.

There were 2,458 households in Latimer, of which 34.7% had children under the age of 18 living in them. Of all households, 50.7% were married-couple households, 16.8% were households with a male householder and no spouse or partner present, and 24.3% were households with a female householder and no spouse or partner present. About 20.9% of all households were made up of individuals and 7.6% had someone living alone who was 65 years of age or older.

As of the 2020 census, 1,798 families resided in the CDP.

There were 2,609 housing units, of which 5.8% were vacant. The homeowner vacancy rate was 1.8% and the rental vacancy rate was 4.7%.

Latimer racial composition
Race	Num.	Perc.
White (non-Hispanic)	5,118	72.16%
Black or African American (non-Hispanic)	544	8.1%
Native American	28	4.42%
Asian	227	3.38%
Pacific Islander	13	0.19%
Other/Mixed	431	6.41%
Hispanic or Latino	359	5.34%

=== 2000 census ===
As of the census of 2000, there were 4,288 people, 1,468 households, and 1,174 families residing in the CDP. The population density was 264.5 inhabitants per square mile (102.1/km^{2}). There were 1,538 housing units at an average density of 94.9 per square mile (36.6/km^{2}). The racial makeup of the CDP was 94.47% White, 2.12% African American, 0.61% Native American, 1.52% Asian, 0.05% Pacific Islander, 0.30% from other races, and 0.93% from two or more races. Hispanic or Latino of any race were 1.19% of the population.

There were 1,468 households, out of which 41.8% had children under the age of 18 living with them, 65.2% were married couples living together, 9.7% had a female householder with no husband present, and 20.0% were non-families. 15.7% of all households were made up of individuals, and 4.6% had someone living alone who was 65 years of age or older. The average household size was 2.92 and the average family size was 3.23.

In the CDP, the population was spread out, with 28.9% under the age of 18, 8.8% from 18 to 24, 33.5% from 25 to 44, 21.2% from 45 to 64, and 7.6% who were 65 years of age or older. The median age was 33 years. For every 100 females, there were 103.3 males. For every 100 females age 18 and over, there were 100.9 males.

The median income for a household in the CDP was $43,146, and the median income for a family was $47,215. Males had a median income of $29,492 versus $22,164 for females. The per capita income for the CDP was $17,551. About 5.6% of families and 8.1% of the population were below the poverty line, including 13.4% of those under age 18 and 14.0% of those age 65 or over.

== Education ==
Latimer is served by the Jackson County School District. It includes three elementary schools, one middle school, and one high school. Students in Latimer attend schools in St. Martin.

=== Elementary schools ===
- St. Martin North Elementary
- St. Martin East Elementary
- St. Martin Upper Elementary

=== Middle school ===
- St. Martin Middle School

=== High school ===
- St. Martin High School
