= St. Martin High School =

Coordinates: 30°26′27″N 88°48′2″W

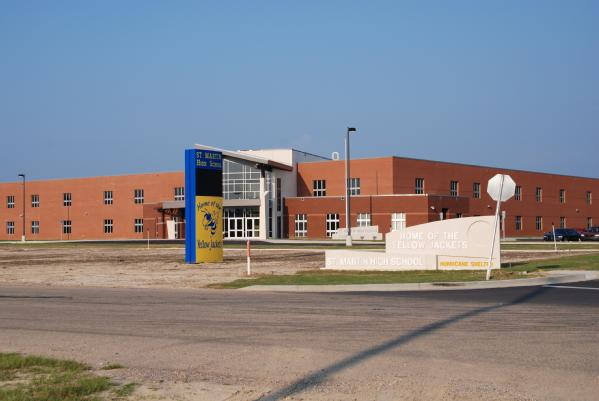

Location
- 11300 Yellow Jacket Blvd; Ocean Springs, Mississippi 39564; United States

Information
- School district: Jackson County School District
- Superintendent: David Baggett
- Principal: Wilson Shea Scarborough
- Teaching staff: 81.31 (FTE)
- Grades: 9–12
- Enrollment: 1,320 (2023-2024)
- Student to teacher ratio: 16.23
- Colors: Blue and gold
- Athletics conference: 7-A
- Mascot: Yellow Jackets
- Nickname: Jackets
- Team name: Yellow Jackets
- Website: smhs.jcsd.ms

St. Martin High School is a suburban public high school located in the unincorporated community of St. Martin, Mississippi, United States, with an Ocean Springs postal address. It is part of the Jackson County School District.

== Athletics ==
St. Martin High School's mascot is the Yellowjacket. Its athletics department consists of Football, Track, Swimming, Cross Country, Softball, Soccer, Volleyball, Basketball, Tennis, Archery, Bowling, Baseball, and Wrestling.

== Extracurricular activities ==
St. Martin High School hosts various activities for its students to take part in. The programs listed below include, but are not limited to, the activities in which students may take part.

- FBLA
- National Honor Society
- FCCLA

St. Martin High School is also home to a branch of the Air Force Junior Reserve Officers' Training Corps, a program shared with Vancleave High School that is hosted at St. Martin.

== Faculty ==
The St. Martin High School faculty consists of the administration, counselors, support staff, and teachers. The principal is Shea Scarborough
