= St. Martin, Mississippi =

Census-designated place in Mississippi, US

- Census-designated place
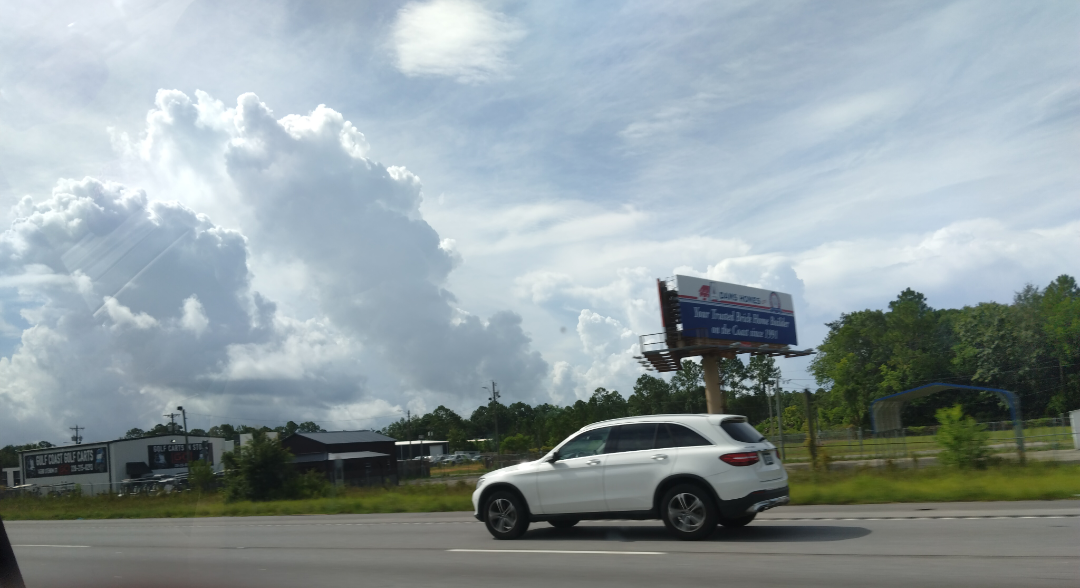
- A highway in St. Martin

- Location of St. Martin, Mississippi

- Location in the United States
- Coordinates: 30°26′31″N 88°52′13″W
- Country: United States of America
- State: Mississippi
- County: Jackson

Area
  - Total: 5.15 sq mi (13.34 km^{2})
  - Land: 4.29 sq mi (11.11 km^{2})
  - Water: 0.86 sq mi (2.23 km^{2})
- Elevation: 13 ft (4 m)

Population (2020)
  - Total: 7,811
  - Density: 1,821.0/sq mi (703.08/km^{2})
- Time zone: UTC-6 (Central (CST))
  - Summer (DST): UTC-5 (CDT)
- ZIP codes: 39564, 39532
- Area code: 228
- FIPS code: 28-64680
- GNIS feature ID: 1867332

St. Martin is a census-designated place (CDP) in Jackson County, Mississippi, United States. It is part of the Pascagoula Metropolitan Statistical Area. As of the 2020 census, St. Martin had a population of 7,811.

== Geography ==
St. Martin is located along the Mississippi Gulf Coast at 30°26′31″N 88°52′13″W (30.441847, -88.870402). It is south of Interstate 10 and is bordered by the CDP of Gulf Hills to the east, Biloxi Bay to the south, and the city of D'Iberville to the west.

According to the United States Census Bureau, the CDP has a total area of 5.1 square miles (13.2 km^{2}), of which 4.2 square miles (11.0 km^{2}) are land and 0.85 square miles (2.2 km^{2}), or 16.84%, are water. St. Martin has either Biloxi or Ocean Springs mailing addresses. The ZIP codes are either 39532 or 39564.

== Demographics ==
Historical population
Census	Pop.	Note	%±
2000	6,676		—
2010	7,730		15.8%
2020	7,811		1.0%
U.S. Decennial Census

=== 2020 census ===
As of the 2020 census, St. Martin had a population of 7,811. The median age was 36.0 years. 22.9% of residents were under the age of 18 and 13.6% of residents were 65 years of age or older. For every 100 females, there were 96.3 males, and for every 100 females age 18 and over, there were 92.7 males.

100.0% of residents lived in urban areas, while 0.0% lived in rural areas.

There were 3,135 households in St. Martin, including 1,645 families. Of all households, 32.6% had children under the age of 18 living in them, 36.1% were married-couple households, 22.1% were households with a male householder and no spouse or partner present, and 31.6% were households with a female householder and no spouse or partner present. About 30.2% of all households were made up of individuals, and 9.3% had someone living alone who was 65 years of age or older.

There were 3,445 housing units, of which 9.0% were vacant. The homeowner vacancy rate was 2.1% and the rental vacancy rate was 10.1%.

St. Martin racial composition
Race	Num.	Perc.
White (non-Hispanic)	4,935	63.18%
Black or African American (non-Hispanic)	1,164	14.9%
Native American	46	0.59%
Asian	735	9.41%
Pacific Islander	12	0.15%
Other/Mixed	445	5.7%
Hispanic or Latino	474	6.07%

=== 2000 census ===
As of the census of 2000, there were 6,676 people, 2,387 households, and 1,833 families residing in the CDP. The population density was 1,528.0 inhabitants per square mile (590.0/km^{2}). There were 2,534 housing units at an average density of 580.0 per square mile (223.9/km^{2}). The racial makeup of the CDP was 82.70% White, 7.94% African American, 0.52% Native American, 6.95% Asian, 0.07% Pacific Islander, 0.42% from other races, and 1.39% from two or more races. Hispanic or Latino of any race were 1.92% of the population.

There were 2,387 households, of which 36.5% had children under the age of 18 living with them, 56.6% were married couples living together, 14.7% had a female householder with no husband present, and 23.2% were non-families. 18.6% of all households were made up of individuals, and 7.5% had someone living alone who was 65 years of age or older. The average household size was 2.80 and the average family size was 3.17.

In the CDP, the population was spread out, with 27.3% under the age of 18, 8.7% from 18 to 24, 29.7% from 25 to 44, 23.8% from 45 to 64, and 10.5% who were 65 years of age or older. The median age was 36 years. For every 100 females, there were 96.6 males. For every 100 females age 18 and over, there were 94.1 males.

The median income for a household in the CDP was $41,167, and the median income for a family was $46,559. Males had a median income of $31,213 versus $22,958 for females. The per capita income for the CDP was $16,439. About 7.1% of families and 10.7% of the population were below the poverty line, including 14.0% of those under age 18 and 20.7% of those age 65 or over.

== Public safety ==
=== Fire department ===
The West Jackson County Fire Department provides fire protection for the community.

=== Law enforcement ===
The Jackson County Sheriff's Office provides law enforcement services for the community.

== Education ==
St. Martin is served by the Jackson County School District. It includes three elementary schools, one middle school, and one high school. St. Martin is also home to a branch of the Jackson-George Regional Library, located at 15004 LeMoyne Boulevard.

=== Elementary schools ===
- St. Martin North Elementary (K-3)
- St. Martin East Elementary (K-3)
- St. Martin Upper Elementary (4-5)

=== Middle schools ===
- St. Martin Middle School (6-8)

=== High schools ===
- St. Martin High School (9-12)

These schools have been consecutively rated as Tier 5 schools due to their excellence.
