= Clara, Mississippi =

- CDP
- Location in the United States
- Coordinates: 31°34′50″N 88°41′47″W
- Country: United States
- State: Mississippi
- County: Wayne

Area
  - Total: 3.89 sq mi (10.08 km^{2})
  - Land: 3.89 sq mi (10.08 km^{2})
  - Water: 0 sq mi (0.00 km^{2})

Population (2020)
  - Total: 386
  - Density: 99.2/sq mi (38.29/km^{2})
- Time zone: UTC-6 (Central (CST))
  - Summer (DST): UTC-5 (CDT)
- ZIP code: 39367
- Area code: 601
- FIPS code: 28-13700

Clara is an unincorporated community in Wayne County, Mississippi, United States. It is located at (31.5804410, -88.6964273). The population was 386 at the 2020 census.

== Demographics ==
Historical population
Census	Pop.	Note	%±
2010	410		—
2020	386		−5.9%
U.S. Decennial Census

Clara first appeared as a census designated place in the 2010 U.S. census.

=== Racial and ethnic composition ===
Clara CDP, Mississippi – Racial and ethnic composition Note: the US Census treats Hispanic/Latino as an ethnic category. This table excludes Latinos from the racial categories and assigns them to a separate category. Hispanics/Latinos may be of any race.
Race / Ethnicity (NH = Non-Hispanic)	Pop 2010	Pop 2020	% 2010	% 2020
White alone (NH)	392	371	95.61%	96.11%
Black or African American alone (NH)	7	2	1.71%	0.52%
Native American or Alaska Native alone (NH)	2	1	0.49%	0.26%
Asian alone (NH)	0	0	0.00%	0.00%
Native Hawaiian or Pacific Islander alone (NH)	0	0	0.00%	0.00%
Other race alone (NH)	0	0	0.00%	0.00%
Mixed race or Multiracial (NH)	9	7	2.20%	1.81%
Hispanic or Latino (any race)	0	5	0.00%	1.30%
Total	410	386	100.00%	100.00%

As of the 2020 United States census, there were 386 people, 291 households, and 118 families residing in the CDP.
