= Gulfport–Biloxi–Pascagoula combined statistical area =

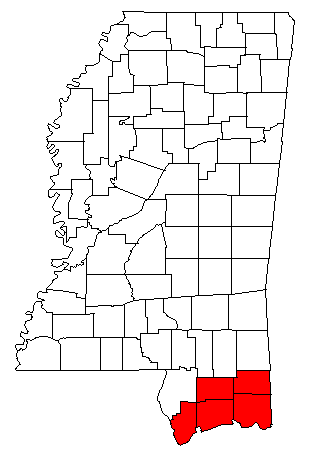
Map of Mississippi highlighting the Gulfport–Biloxi–Pascagoula combined statistical area.

The Gulfport–Biloxi–Pascagoula combined statistical area is made up of five counties in the Mississippi Gulf Coast region. The statistical area consists of the Gulfport–Biloxi Metropolitan Statistical Area and the Pascagoula Metropolitan Statistical Area. The 2010 census placed the CSA population at 411,066, and as of 2024, is estimated to be 452,673. The area was significantly impacted by Hurricane Katrina on August 29, 2005, although population growth has steadily rebounded in recent years.

== Counties ==
- Hancock
- Harrison
- George
- Jackson
- Stone

== Communities ==
=== Places with more than 25,000 inhabitants ===
- Gulfport
- Biloxi

=== Places with 10,000 to 25,000 inhabitants ===
- Gautier
- Long Beach
- Moss Point
- Ocean Springs
- Pascagoula

=== Places with 5,000 to 10,000 inhabitants ===
- Bay St. Louis
- D'Iberville
- Diamondhead CDP
- Gulf Hills CDP
- Pass Christian
- St. Martin CDP
- Waveland

=== Places with less than 5,000 inhabitants ===
- Big Point CDP
- Escatawpa CDP
- Gulf Park Estates CDP
- Helena CDP
- Hickory Hills CDP
- Hurley CDP
- Kiln CDP
- Latimer CDP
- Lucedale
- Lyman CDP
- Pearlington CDP
- Saucier CDP
- Shoreline Park CDP
- Vancleave CDP
- Wade CDP
- Wiggins

=== Unincorporated places ===
- Agricola
- Bayou Caddy
- Benndale
- Bexley
- Bond
- Clermont Harbor
- Cuevas
- De Lisle
- Howison
- Kreole
- Lakeshore
- Lizana
- McHenry
- Merrill
- Perkinston

== Demographics ==
As of the census of 2000, there were 396,754 people, 147,600 households, and 105,041 families residing within the CSA. The racial makeup of the CSA was 76.72% White, 18.82% African American, 0.41% Native American, 1.87% Asian, 0.06% Pacific Islander, 0.75% from other races, and 1.37% from two or more races. Hispanic or Latino of any race were 2.26% of the population.

There were 147,600 households, out of which 34.8% had children under the age of 18 living with them, 52.3% were married couples living together, 14.2% had a female householder with no husband present, and 28.8% were non-families. 23.6% of all households were made up of individuals, and 8.1% had someone living alone who was 65 years of age or older. The average household size was 2.66 and the average family size was 3.10.

In the CSA the population was spread out, with 26.7% under the age of 18, 10.1% from 18 to 24, 29.8% from 25 to 44, 22.3% from 45 to 64, and 11.1% who were 65 years of age or older. The median age was 35 years. For every 100 females, there were 98.8 males. For every 100 females age 18 and over, there were 96.8 males.

The median income for a household in the CSA was $35,034, and the median income for a family was $40,617. Males had a median income of $30,985 versus $21,727 for females. The per capita income for the CSA was $16,514.

== See also ==
- List of metropolitan areas in Mississippi
- List of micropolitan areas in Mississippi
- List of cities in Mississippi
- List of towns and villages in Mississippi
- List of census-designated places in Mississippi
- List of United States metropolitan areas
