= Pascagoula metropolitan area =

Metropolitan area of Mississippi, US

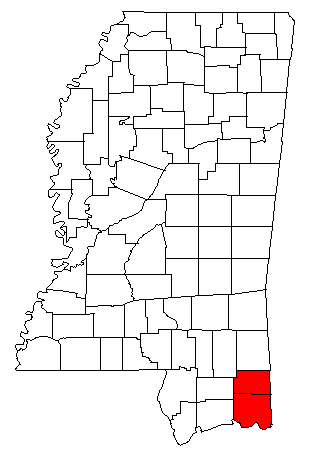
Map of Mississippi highlighting the Pascagoula metropolitan area.

The Pascagoula metropolitan statistical area was a metropolitan area in the southeastern corner of Mississippi that covered two counties - Jackson and George. As of the 2000 census, the MSA had a population of 150,564. The area was significantly impacted by Hurricane Katrina in 2005. A July 1, 2009 estimate placed the population at 155,603. Prior to the hurricane, the area had experienced steady population growth. It was also part of the larger Gulfport-Biloxi-Pascagoula Combined Statistical Area.

As of 2020, this area is no longer designated as a metropolitan statistical area. Jackson County is part of the Gulfport–Biloxi metropolitan area, and George County is not included in any metropolitan or micropolitan statistical area.

== Counties ==
- George
- Jackson

== Communities ==
=== Cities and towns ===
- Gautier
- Lucedale
- Moss Point
- Ocean Springs
- Pascagoula (Principal city)

=== Census-designated places ===
- Big Point
- Escatawpa
- Gulf Hills
- Gulf Park Estates
- Helena
- Hickory Hills
- Hurley
- Latimer
- St. Martin
- Vancleave
- Wade

=== Unincorporated places ===
- Agricola
- Benndale
- Bexley
- Kreole
- Merrill
- Orange Grove

== Demographics ==
As of the census of 2000, there were 150,564 people, 54,418 households, and 41,014 families residing within the MSA. The racial makeup of the MSA was 77.13% White, 19.34% African American, 0.32% Native American, 1.39% Asian, 0.03% Pacific Islander, 0.73% from other races, and 1.05% from two or more races. Hispanic or Latino of any race were 2.07% of the population.

There were 54,418 households, out of which 37.2% had children under the age of 18 living with them, 56.7% were married couples living together, 14.0% had a female householder with no husband present, and 24.6% were non-families. 20.6% of all households were made up of individuals, and 7.2% had someone living alone who was 65 years of age or older. The average household size was 2.75 and the average family size was 3.16.

In the MSA the population was spread out, with 27.8% under the age of 18, 9.3% from 18 to 24, 29.7% from 25 to 44, 22.7% from 45 to 64, and 10.4% who were 65 years of age or older. The median age was 34 years. For every 100 females, there were 98.5 males. For every 100 females age 18 and over, there were 96.2 males.

The median income for a household in the MSA was $36,924, and the median income for a family was $42,239. Males had a median income of $33,286 versus $21,656 for females. The per capita income for the MSA was $16,053.

== See also ==
- Mississippi census statistical areas
- List of metropolitan areas in Mississippi
- List of micropolitan areas in Mississippi
- List of cities in Mississippi
- List of towns and villages in Mississippi
- List of census-designated places in Mississippi
- List of United States metropolitan areas
