= Gulfport–Biloxi metropolitan area =

Metropolitan statistical area in Mississippi, US

Mississippi Gulf Coast
- Metropolitan Statistical Area
- Gulfport–Biloxi Metropolitan Statistical Area
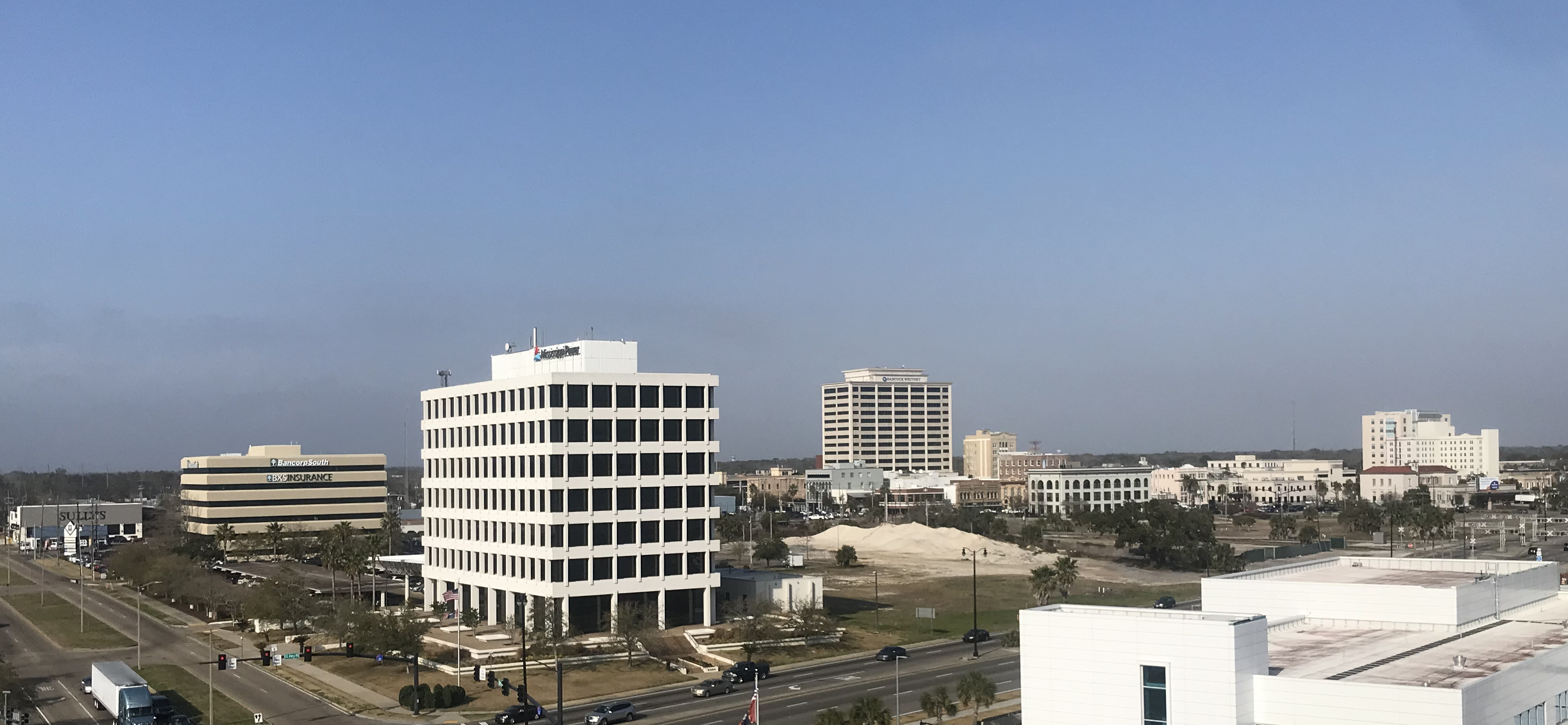
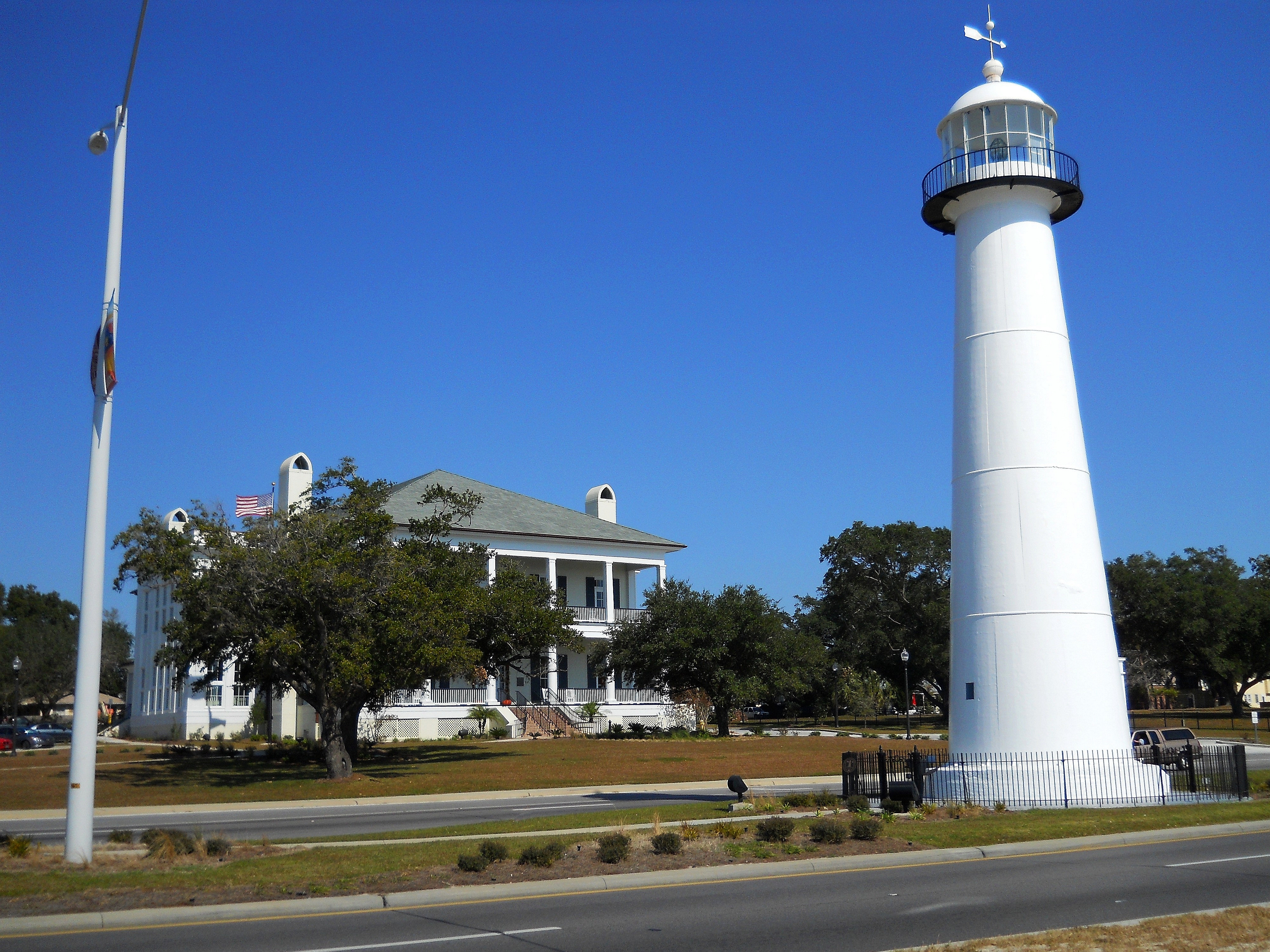
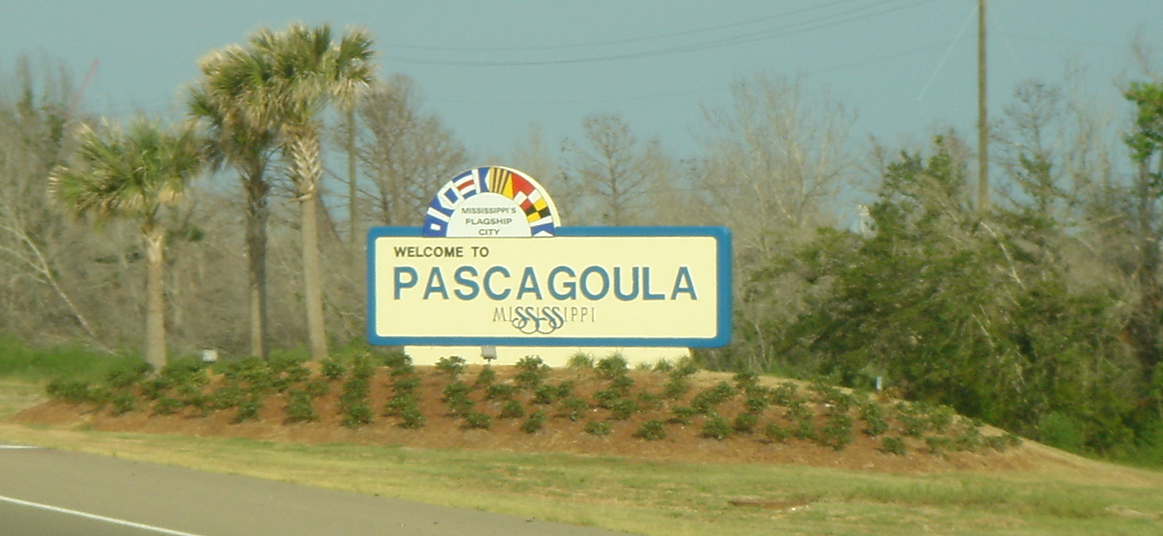
- From top to bottom: Gulfport, Biloxi, Pascagoula
Interactive Map of Gulfport–Biloxi, MS CSA
City of Gulfport
City of Biloxi
City of Pascagoula
Gulfport–Biloxi, MS MSA
- Country: United States
- State: Mississippi
- Principal cities: List: Gulfport; Biloxi; Pascagoula

Area
  - Land: 2,220 sq mi (5,740 km^{2})

Population (2020)
  - Total: 416,259

GDP
  - Metro: $23.511 billion (2022)
- Time zone: UTC-6 (CST)
  - Summer (DST): UTC-5 (CDT)

The Gulfport–Biloxi Metropolitan Statistical Area is a metropolitan statistical area (MSA) in the Mississippi Gulf Coast region that includes four counties – Hancock, Harrison, Jackson and Stone. The principal cities are Gulfport and Biloxi. The 2010 census placed the Gulfport-Biloxi MSA population at 388,488, though as of 2019, it was estimated to have increased to 417,665. The area was significantly impacted by Hurricane Katrina on August 29, 2005, and prior to the hurricane, had experienced steady to moderate population growth. However, growth has since rebounded, with the population steadily increasing every year throughout the 2010s.

== Counties ==
County	Seat(s)	2025 estimate	2020 Census	Change	Area	Density
Harrison	Biloxi & Gulfport	217,136	208,621	+4.08%	574 sq mi (1,490 km^{2})	378/sq mi (146/km^{2})
Jackson	Pascagoula	147,666	143,252	+3.08%	723 sq mi (1,870 km^{2})	204/sq mi (79/km^{2})
Hancock	Bay St. Louis	46,873	46,053	+1.78%	474 sq mi (1,230 km^{2})	99/sq mi (38/km^{2})
Stone	Wiggins	19,654	18,333	+7.21%	445 sq mi (1,150 km^{2})	44/sq mi (17/km^{2})
Total		431,329	416,259	+3.62%	2,216 sq mi (5,740 km^{2})	195/sq mi (75/km^{2})

== Communities ==
=== Cities and towns ===
- Bay St. Louis
- Biloxi (Principal city)
- Diamondhead
- D'Iberville
- Gautier
- Gulfport (Principal city)
- Long Beach
- Moss Point
- Ocean Springs
- Pascagoula
- Pass Christian
- Waveland
- Wiggins

=== Census-designated places ===
- Big Point
- Escatawpa
- Gulf Hills
- Gulf Park Estates
- Helena
- Hickory Hills (former CDP)
- Hurley
- Kiln
- Latimer
- Lyman
- Pearlington
- Saucier
- Shoreline Park
- St. Martin
- Vancleave
- Wade

=== Unincorporated places ===
- Bayou Caddy
- Bond
- Clermont Harbor
- Cuevas
- De Lisle
- East Moss Point
- Gulf Islands National Seashore
- Howison
- Lakeshore
- McHenry
- Orange Grove
- Perkinston
- Woolmarket

== Demographics ==
As of the census of 2000, there were 246,190 people, 93,182 households, and 64,027 families residing within the MSA. The racial makeup of the MSA was 76.47% White, 18.49% African American, 0.47% Native American, 2.17% Asian, 0.07% Pacific Islander, 0.76% from other races, and 1.57% from two or more races. Hispanic or Latino of any race were 2.38% of the population.

There were 93,182 households, out of which 33.4% had children under the age of 18 living with them, 49.7% were married couples living together, 14.3% had a female householder with no husband present, and 31.3% were non-families. 25.4% of all households were made up of individuals, and 8.5% had someone living alone who was 65 years of age or older. The average household size was 2.60 and the average family size was 3.06.

In the MSA the population was spread out, with 25.9% under the age of 18, 10.5% from 18 to 24, 29.9% from 25 to 44, 22.1% from 45 to 64, and 11.6% who were 65 years of age or older. The median age was 35 years. For every 100 females there were 98.9 males. For every 100 females age 18 and over, there were 97.1 males.

The median income for a household in the MSA was $33,774, and the median income for a family was $39,536. Males had a median income of $29,452 versus $21,775 for females. The per capita income for the MSA was $16,822.

== See also ==
- Mississippi statistical areas
- List of metropolitan areas in Mississippi
- List of micropolitan areas in Mississippi
- List of cities in Mississippi
- List of towns and villages in Mississippi
- List of census-designated places in Mississippi
- List of United States metropolitan areas
