= Mississippi Highway 613 =

State Highway in Mississippi

Mississippi Highway 613

Route information
- Maintained by MDOT
- Length: 45.649 mi (73.465 km)
- Existed: 1956–present

Major junctions
- South end: US 90 in Pascagoula
- I-10 in Moss Point; MS 63 near Escatawpa; MS 614 in Hurley
- North end: MS 198 in Lucedale

Location
- Country: United States
- State: Mississippi
- Counties: Jackson, George

Highway system
- Mississippi State Highway System; Interstate; US; State
← MS 612	→ MS 614

Mississippi Highway 613 (MS 613) is a 45.7-mile-long (73.5 km) north-south state highway in the eastern Mississippi Gulf Coast region of southeastern Mississippi. It connects the town of Lucedale with the city of Pascagoula.

== Route description ==
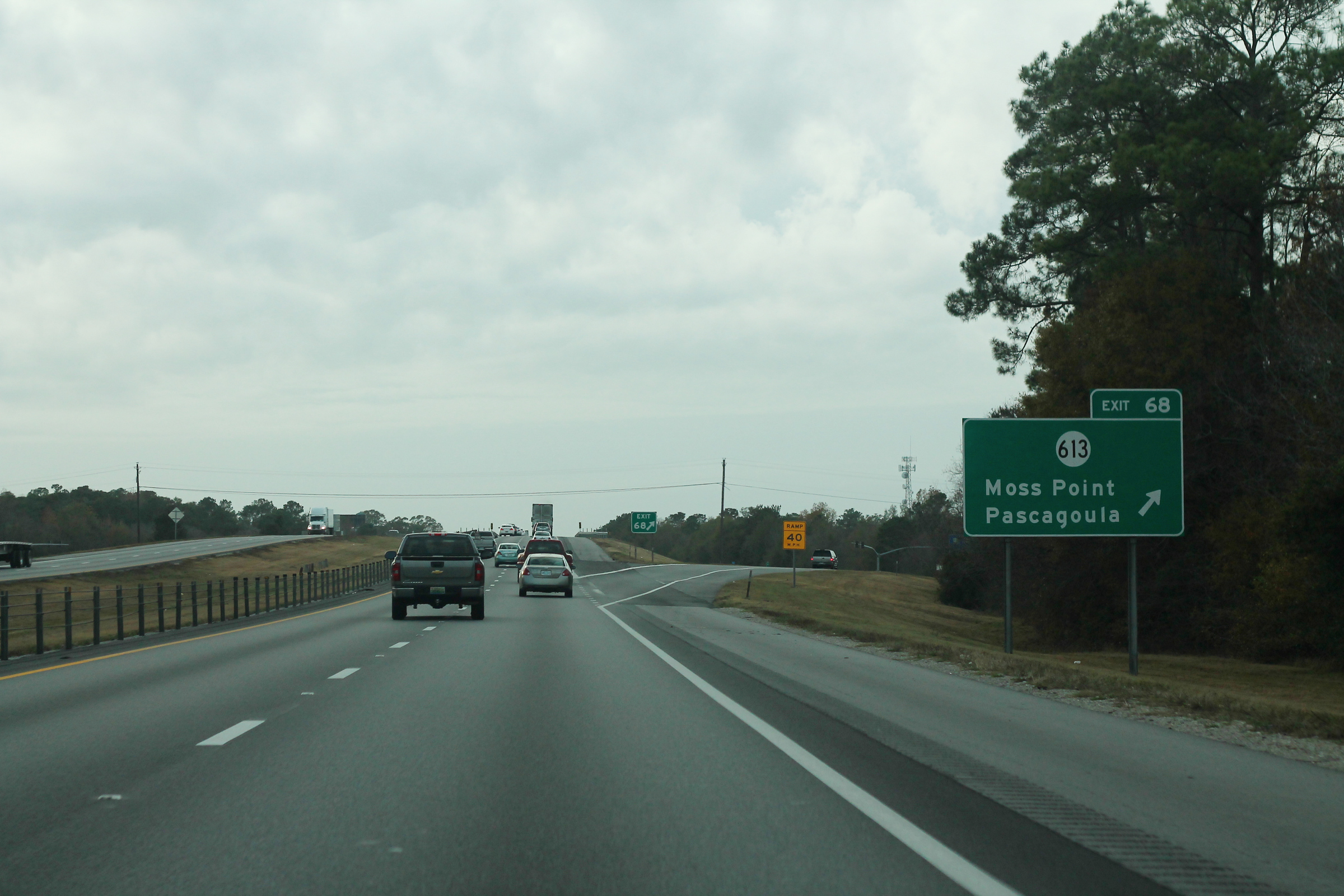
Interstate 10 westbound at its interchange with Mississippi Highway 613 (Exit 68) in Moss Point

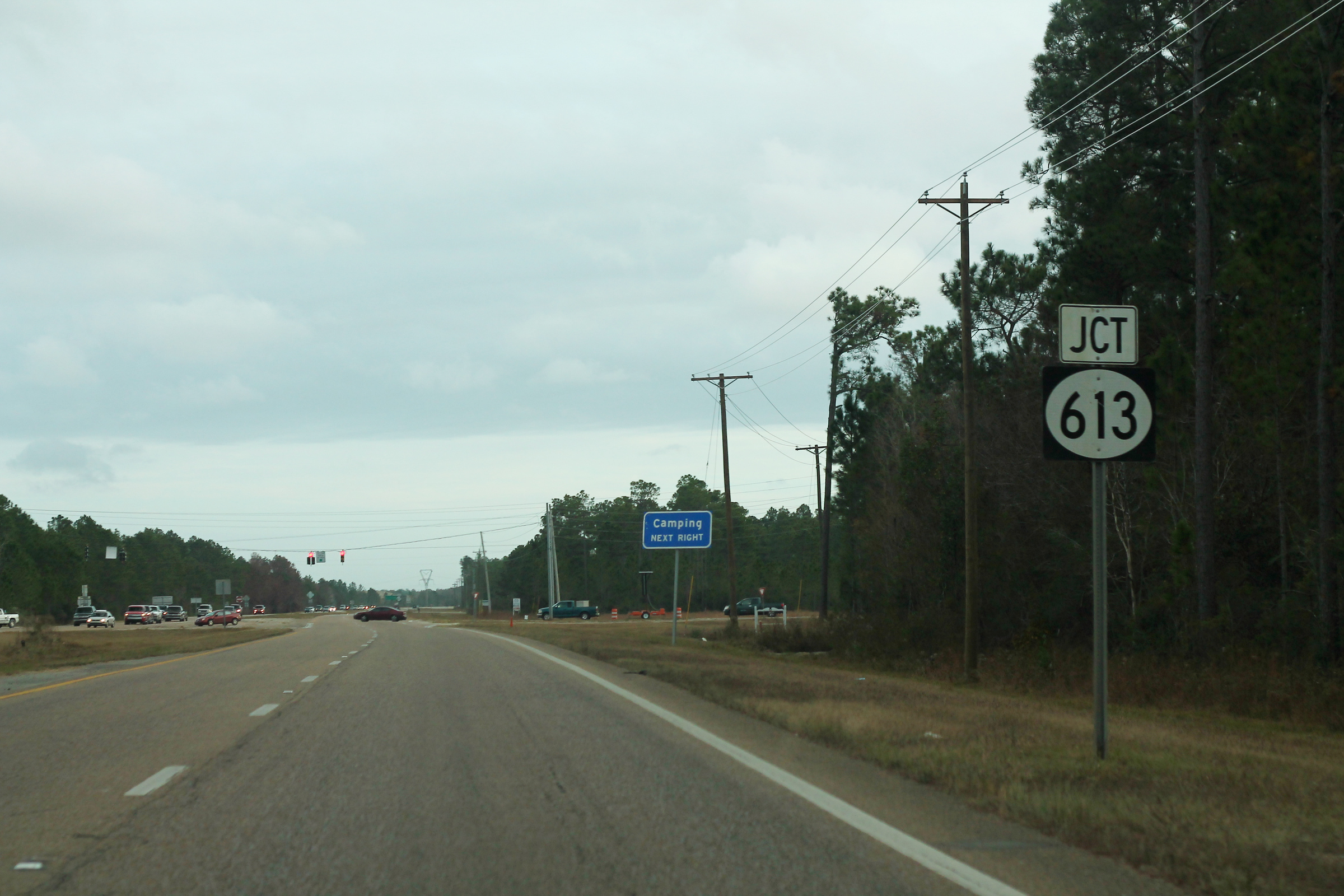
MS 63 at its intersection with MS 613 near Escatawpa

MS 613 begins in Jackson County at an intersection with US 90 in the city of Pascaguola, only about 2.0 miles (3.2 km) north of the Gulf of Mexico coastline. It heads northeast as a four-lane undivided highway along Telephone Road through a mix of neighborhoods and business districts, where it passes by the Jackson County Fairgrounds and Civic Center at a large intersection with Shortcut Road, where it curves northward to pass through another business district to enter the neighboring city of Moss Point at an intersection with Jefferson Avenue. MS 613 passes through more neighborhoods before traveling straight through downtown along Main Street, where it has an intersection with Mc Innis Avenue (unsigned MS 618), before leaving downtown and crossing the Jack G. Hanson Memorial Bridge over the Escatawpa River. The highway has an interchange with I-10 (Exit 68) before leaving Moss Point, narrowing to two-lanes, and traveling north through the community of Escatawpa and having an intersection with MS 63 directly beside Plant Daniel. MS 613 heads northeast for a few miles to the community of Big Point, where it curves back northward as it passes through the communities of Hurley (where it has an intersection with MS 614) and Harleston before crossing into George County.

MS 613 winds its way northwest through rural farmland for several miles, passing through the communities of Agricola and Evanston, to enter the city limits of Lucedale and travel through some neighborhoods along Carter Street before turning north (right) onto Mill Street in a small business district. The highway passes through more neighborhoods for several blocks before entering downtown and coming to an end at an intersection with MS 198 (Main Street) near the center of town.

== History ==
Historically, the alignment of MS 613 was the previous route for MS 63. MS 63 was realigned westward from Big Point, Hurley and Agricola by 1960, with MS 613 designated northward from their meeting outside Moss Point to US 98 in Lucedale. With a new alignment built for MS 63 south into Moss Point, MS 613 was extended south over the former MS 63 to Pascagoula by 1981.

== Major intersections ==
County	Location	mi	km	Destinations	Notes
Jackson	Pascagoula	0.000	0.000	US 90 (Denny Avenue) – Mobile, Grand Bay, Gautier, Biloxi	Southern terminus; RIRO intersection with US 90 westbound
Jackson	Pascagoula	1.1	1.8	MS 611 south	Northern terminus of MS 611
Jackson	Moss Point	3.535	5.689	MS 618 east	Western terminus of unsigned MS 618
Jackson	Moss Point	5.378– 5.553	8.655– 8.937	I-10 – Mobile, New Orleans	I-10 exit 68
Jackson		11.741– 11.755	18.895– 18.918	MS 63 – Lucedale, Pascagoula	
Jackson	Hurley	22.691	36.518	MS 614 – Wade, Mobile	
George	Agricola	35.980	57.904	MS 612 east – Wilmer	Western terminus of MS 612
George	Lucedale	45.649	73.465	MS 198 (Main Street) to US 98 / MS 26 – McLain, Mobile	Northern terminus
1.000 mi = 1.609 km; 1.000 km = 0.621 mi
