= Mississippi Highway 612 =

Highway in Mississippi

Mississippi Highway 612
- MS 612 highlighted in violet

Route information
- Maintained by MDOT
- Length: 7.05 mi (11.35 km)
- Existed: c. 1966–present

Major junctions
- West end: MS 613 southeast of Lucedale, MS
- East end: CR 7 northwest of Mobile, AL

Location
- Country: United States
- State: Mississippi
- Counties: George

Highway system
- Mississippi State Highway System; Interstate; US; State
← MS 611	→ MS 613

Mississippi Highway 612 (MS 612) is a highway in southeastern Mississippi. The route starts at MS 613, southwest of Lucedale. It travels southeastward through George County, crossing over Escatawpa River. The route ends at the Alabama state line, and County Road 7 (CR 7) continues into Mobile County. MS 612 was designated in 1966, and no significant changes have been made to the route since.

== Route description ==
Traffic volume on Mississippi Highway 612
Location	Volume
East of MS 613	2,300
Northwest of Will Howell Road	1,600
East of Walt Tanner Road and Howell Tanner Chapel Road	800
Data was measured in 2015 in terms of AADT; Source:

All of the highway is located within the southeastern portion of George County. Just north of the community of Agricola, MS 612 starts at the intersection with MS 613. It travels eastward and crosses the Mississippi Export Railroad shortly. Past East Fire Department Road, the road begins to travel east-southeastward through a small forest. At Red Creek Church Road, MS 612 travels southeast into a larger forest. Near C F Ward Road, the road crosses over a small creek, and it later crosses the Escatawpa River. After its intersection with Will Howell Road, MS 612 turns eastward and begins travelling in a straight line. The road enters a clearing near Walt Tanner Road and Howell Tanner Chapel Road, the last intersection before the state line. The route ends at the Mississippi–Alabama state line, and County Road 7, also known as Natchez Highway, continues into Mobile County to connect with US 98 just west of the town of Wilmer.

MS 612 is legally defined in Mississippi Code § 65-3-3, and is maintained by the Mississippi Department of Transportation.

== History ==
The designation of MS 612 was established in 1966. It was part of a construction project in 1967, with a total cost of $611,248. Around 1967, the highway was added to the state map as a paved road, from MS 613 to the state border. The route has not been changed significantly since 1967.

== Major intersections ==
County	Location	mi	km	Destinations	Notes
George	Agricola	0.00	0.00	MS 613 – Moss Point, Lucedale	Western terminus
Mobile		7.05	11.35	CR 7 (Natchez Highway) to US 98 – Wilmer	Eastern terminus; Alabama state line
1.000 mi = 1.609 km; 1.000 km = 0.621 mi
