= Mississippi Highway 614 =

State Highway in Mississippi

Mississippi Highway 614

Route information
- Maintained by MDOT
- Length: 10.327 mi (16.620 km)
- Existed: 1960–present

Major junctions
- West end: MS 63 in Wade
- MS 613 in Hurley
- East end: CR 56 (Airport Boulevard) at the Alabama state line near Mobile

Location
- Country: United States
- State: Mississippi
- Counties: Jackson

Highway system
- Mississippi State Highway System; Interstate; US; State
← MS 613	→ MS 615

Mississippi Highway 614 (MS 614) is a 10.3-mile-long (16.6 km) east–west state highway in northeastern Jackson County, Mississippi. It connects the communities of Wade and Hurley with the Alabama state line and the city of Mobile.

== Route description ==
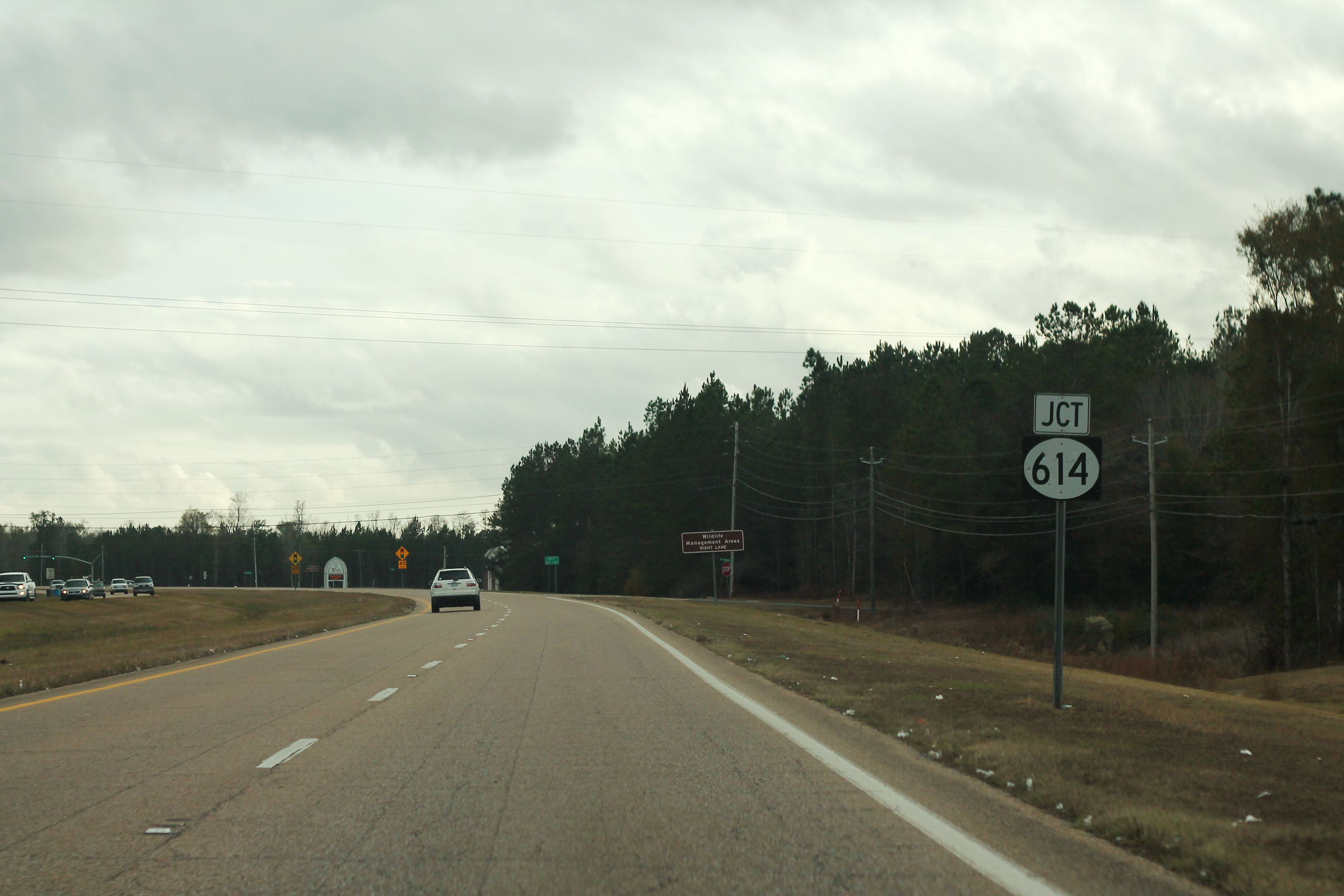
MS 63 southbound at its intersection with MS 614 in Wade

MS 614 begins in the community of Wade at an intersection with MS 63; the road continues west as Wade–Vancleave Road to cross the Pascagoula River and connect to the community of Vancleave and MS 57. It heads northeast to leave Wade and travel through woodlands for a few miles to pass through the community of Hurley, where it has a junction with MS 613 at the main crossroads at the center of town. The highway leaves Hurley and heads southeast through farmland for several miles, where it crosses the Escatawpa River before curving back northeastward for a couple miles to come to the Alabama state line. MS 614 comes to an end and the roadway continues east as CR 56 (Airport Boulevard) into the city of Mobile.

The entire length of Mississippi Highway 614 is a rural two-lane highway.

== Major intersections ==
The entire route is in Jackson County.

Location	mi	km	Destinations	Notes
Wade	0.000	0.000	MS 63 / Wade-Vancleave Road – Pascagoula	Western terminus; road continues west as Wade-Vancleave Road
Hurley	4.663	7.504	MS 613 – Lucedale, Moss Point	
	10.327	16.620	CR 56 (Airport Boulevard) – Mobile, Mobile Regional Airport	Eastern terminus; Alabama state line
1.000 mi = 1.609 km; 1.000 km = 0.621 mi
