= Jack G. Hanson =

United States Army Medal of Honor recipient

- Born: September 18, 1930; Escatawpa, Mississippi, United States
- Died: June 7, 1951 (aged 20) near Pachi-dong, Korea
- Burial place: Robinson Cemetery, Escatawpa, Mississippi
- Military career
- Allegiance: United States
- Branch: United States Army
- Service years: c. 1950–1951
- Rank: Private First Class
- Units: Company F, 31st Infantry Regiment, 7th Infantry Division
- Conflicts: Korean War †
- Awards: Medal of Honor; Purple Heart

Jack Glennon Hanson (September 18, 1930 – June 7, 1951) was a soldier in the United States Army during the Korean War who was posthumously awarded the Medal of Honor for his actions on June 7, 1951, during which he saved the members of his squad.

== Medal of Honor citation ==
Rank and organization: Private First Class, U.S. Army, Company F, 31st Infantry Regiment, 7th Infantry Division

Place and date: Near Pachi-dong, Korea, June 7, 1951

Entered service at: Galveston, Tex. Born: September 18, 1930, Escatawpa, Miss.

G.O. No.: 15, February 1, 1952

Citation:

Pfc. Hanson, a machine gunner with the 1st Platoon, Company F, distinguished himself by conspicuous gallantry and intrepidity at the risk of his life above and beyond the call of duty in action against an armed enemy of the United Nations. The company, in defensive positions on two strategic hills separated by a wide saddle, was ruthlessly attacked at approximately 0300 hours, the brunt of which centered on the approach to the divide within range of Pfc. Hanson's machine gun. In the initial phase of the action, 4 riflemen were wounded and evacuated and the numerically superior enemy, advancing under cover of darkness, infiltrated and posed an imminent threat to the security of the command post and weapons platoon. Upon orders to move to key terrain above and to the right of Pfc. Hanson's position, he voluntarily remained to provide protective fire for the withdrawal. Subsequent to the retiring elements fighting a rearguard action to the new location, it was learned that Pfc. Hanson's assistant gunner and 3 riflemen had been wounded and had crawled to safety, and that he was maintaining a lone-man defense. After the 1st Platoon reorganized, counterattacked, and resecured its original positions at approximately 0530 hours, Pfc. Hanson's body was found lying in front of his emplacement, his machine gun ammunition expended, his empty pistol in his right hand, and a machete with blood on the blade in his left hand, and approximately 22 enemy dead lay in the wake of his action. Pfc. Hanson's consummate valor, inspirational conduct, and willing self-sacrifice enabled the company to contain the enemy and regain the commanding ground, and reflect lasting glory on himself and the noble traditions of the military service.

== See also ==
- List of Korean War Medal of Honor recipients
