= Big Point, Mississippi =

- Census-designated place
- Location of Big Point, Mississippi

- Location in the United States
- Coordinates: 30°35′13″N 88°28′55″W
- Country: United States
- State: Mississippi
- County: Jackson

Area
  - Total: 2.94 sq mi (7.61 km^{2})
  - Land: 2.94 sq mi (7.61 km^{2})
  - Water: 0 sq mi (0.00 km^{2})
- Elevation: 59 ft (18 m)

Population (2020)
  - Total: 618
  - Density: 210/sq mi (81.2/km^{2})
- Time zone: UTC-6 (Central (CST))
  - Summer (DST): UTC-5 (CDT)
- ZIP code: 39562
- Area code: 228
- FIPS code: 28-06180
- GNIS feature ID: 0667134

Big Point is an unincorporated community and census-designated place (CDP) in Jackson County, Mississippi, United States. It is part of the Pascagoula, Mississippi Metropolitan Statistical Area. Per the 2020 Census, the population was 618.

== History ==
A post office operated under the name Bigpoint from 1894 to 1942.

== Geography ==
Big Point is located in northeastern Jackson County at 30°35′13″N 88°28′55″W (30.586925, -88.481968). Mississippi Highway 613 passes through the community, leading north 5 miles (8 km) to Hurley and southwest 9 miles (14 km) to Escatawpa. Pascagoula, the county seat, is 18 miles (29 km) south of Big Point.

According to the United States Census Bureau, the CDP has a total area of 2.9 square miles (7.6 km^{2}), all land.

== Demographics ==
Historical population
Census	Pop.	Note	%±
2000	115		—
2010	611		431.3%
2020	618		1.1%
U.S. Decennial Census; 2010 2020

Big Point was first listed as a census designated place in the 2000 U.S. census.

=== Racial and ethnic composition ===
Big Point CDP, Mississippi – Racial and ethnic composition Note: the US Census treats Hispanic/Latino as an ethnic category. This table excludes Latinos from the racial categories and assigns them to a separate category. Hispanics/Latinos may be of any race.
Race / Ethnicity (NH = Non-Hispanic)	Pop 2000	Pop 2010	Pop 2020	% 2000	% 2010	% 2020
White alone (NH)	114	589	565	99.13%	96.40%	91.42%
Black or African American alone (NH)	0	8	5	0.00%	1.31%	0.81%
Native American or Alaska Native alone (NH)	0	5	5	0.00%	0.82%	0.81%
Asian alone (NH)	0	0	6	0.00%	0.00%	0.97%
Native Hawaiian or Pacific Islander alone (NH)	0	0	1	0.00%	0.00%	0.16%
Other race alone (NH)	0	0	0	0.00%	0.00%	0.00%
Mixed race or Multiracial (NH)	1	2	18	0.87%	0.33%	2.91%
Hispanic or Latino (any race)	0	7	18	0.00%	1.15%	2.91%
Total	115	611	618	100.00%	100.00%	100.00%

=== 2000 Census ===
As of the census of 2000, there were 115 people, 41 households, and 38 families residing in the CDP. The population density was 1,059.0 inhabitants per square mile (408.9/km^{2}). There were 42 housing units at an average density of 386.8 per square mile (149.3/km^{2}). The racial makeup of the CDP was 99.13% White, and 0.87% from two or more races.

There were 41 households, out of which 41.5% had children under the age of 18 living with them, 85.4% were married couples living together, 9.8% had a female householder with no husband present, and 4.9% were non-families. 4.9% of all households were made up of individuals, and none had someone living alone who was 65 years of age or older. The average household size was 2.80 and the average family size was 2.90.

In the CDP, the population was spread out, with 25.2% under the age of 18, 9.6% from 18 to 24, 30.4% from 25 to 44, 21.7% from 45 to 64, and 13.0% who were 65 years of age or older. The median age was 38 years. For every 100 females, there were 76.9 males. For every 100 females age 18 and over, there were 75.5 males.

The median income for a household in the CDP was $30,125, and the median income for a family was $30,125. Males had a median income of $22,361 versus $0 for females. The per capita income for the CDP was $10,243. None of the population and none of the families were below the poverty line.

== Education ==
Big Point is served by the Jackson County School District. It includes two elementary schools, one middle school, and one high school. Students in Big Point attend schools in Hurley, Mississippi.

=== Elementary schools ===
- East Central Lower Elementary School
- East Central Upper Elementary School

=== Middle school ===
- East Central Middle School

=== High school ===
- East Central High School
