= Effects of Hurricane Katrina in the Southeastern United States =

Hurricane Katrina
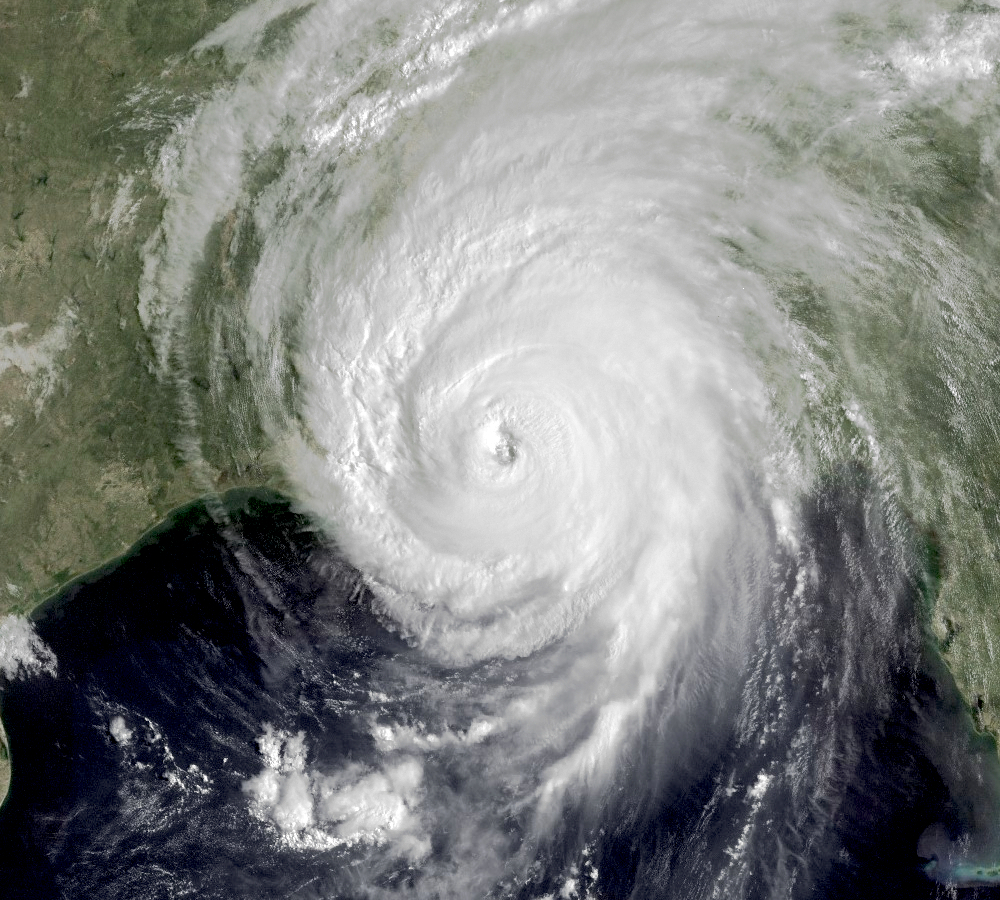
- Katrina at its final landfall near the border of Louisiana and Mississippi on August 29

Meteorological history
- Duration: August 25–31, 2005

Category 3 major hurricane
- 1-minute sustained (SSHWS/NWS)
- Highest winds: 125 mph (205 km/h)
- Lowest pressure: 920 mbar (hPa); 27.17 inHg

Overall effects
- Fatalities: 1,392
- Damage: $125 billion (2005 USD)
- Areas affected: South Florida, Gulf Coast of the United States (especially Louisiana and Mississippi), Ohio Valley
- Part of the 2005 Atlantic hurricane season

The Southeastern United States, extending from South Florida to Louisiana and areas inland, was severely affected by Hurricane Katrina, which caused many deaths and billions in damages. After developing on August 23, Katrina made landfall near the border of Broward and Miami-Dade counties with 80 mph (130 km/h) winds on August 25. After emerging from the state, Katrina intensified into one of the strongest Atlantic hurricanes, becoming a Category 5 on the Saffir–Simpson scale. It weakened slightly before making landfall on August 29, 2005. It struck the Gulf Coast as a Category 3 hurricane. It moved ashore near the border of Louisiana and Mississippi and weakened as it moved inland, dissipating on August 31.

In Florida, the storm affected the southern portion of the state and in the panhandle. While it was crossing the state, the hurricane's convection was asymmetrical, primarily located to the south and east of the center. As a result, high rainfall totals occurred in the Miami area, peaking at 16.43 in (417 mm) in Perrine. The rains caused flooding, and the combination of rains and winds downed trees and power lines, leaving 1.45 million people without power. Damage in South Florida was estimated at $523 million (2005 USD), mostly as a result of crop damage. Further south, the hurricane spawned a tornado in the Florida Keys. In the island chain, Katrina caused heavy rainfall and gusty winds. The storm produced a 5.37 ft (1.64 m) storm surge in Pensacola along the panhandle. High waves caused beach erosion and closed nearby roadways. There were five tornadoes in northwestern Florida. Damage was estimated along the panhandle at $100 million. Throughout the state, the hurricane killed 14 people, of which 6 were directly related to the storm's effects. Due to damage from Katrina, 11 Florida counties were declared federal disaster areas.

Hurricane Katrina's winds and storm surge reached the Mississippi coastline on the morning of August 29, 2005, beginning a two-day path of destruction through central Mississippi; by 10 a.m. CDT on August 29, 2005, the eye of Katrina began traveling up the entire state, only slowing from hurricane-force winds at Meridian near 7 p.m. and entering Tennessee as a tropical storm.

Many coastal towns of Mississippi (and Louisiana) had already been obliterated, in a single night. Hurricane-force winds reached coastal Mississippi by 2 a.m. and lasted over 17 hours, spawning 11 tornadoes (51 in other states) and a 28-foot (8.5 m) storm surge flooding 6–12 miles (9.7–19.3 km) inland. Many, unable to evacuate, survived by climbing to attics or rooftops, or swimming to higher buildings and trees. The worst property damage from Katrina occurred in coastal Mississippi, where all towns flooded over 90% in hours, and waves destroyed many historic buildings, with others gutted to the 3rd story. Afterward, 238 people died in Mississippi, and all counties in Mississippi were declared disaster areas, 49 for full federal assistance. Regulations were changed later for emergency centers and casinos. The emergency command centers were moved higher because all 3 coastal centers flooded at 30 ft (9.1 m) above sea level. Casinos were allowed on land rather than limited to floating casino barges as in 2005.

More than one million people in Mississippi were affected, and almost 6 months later, the extent of the devastation in Mississippi was still described as "staggering" in USA Today on February 16, 2006: "The Mississippi Gulf Coast has been devastated. The extent of the devastation in Mississippi is also staggering. Since Katrina hit, more than half a million people in Mississippi have applied for assistance from FEMA. In a state of just 2.9 million residents, that means more than one in six Mississippians have sought help.

== Background ==
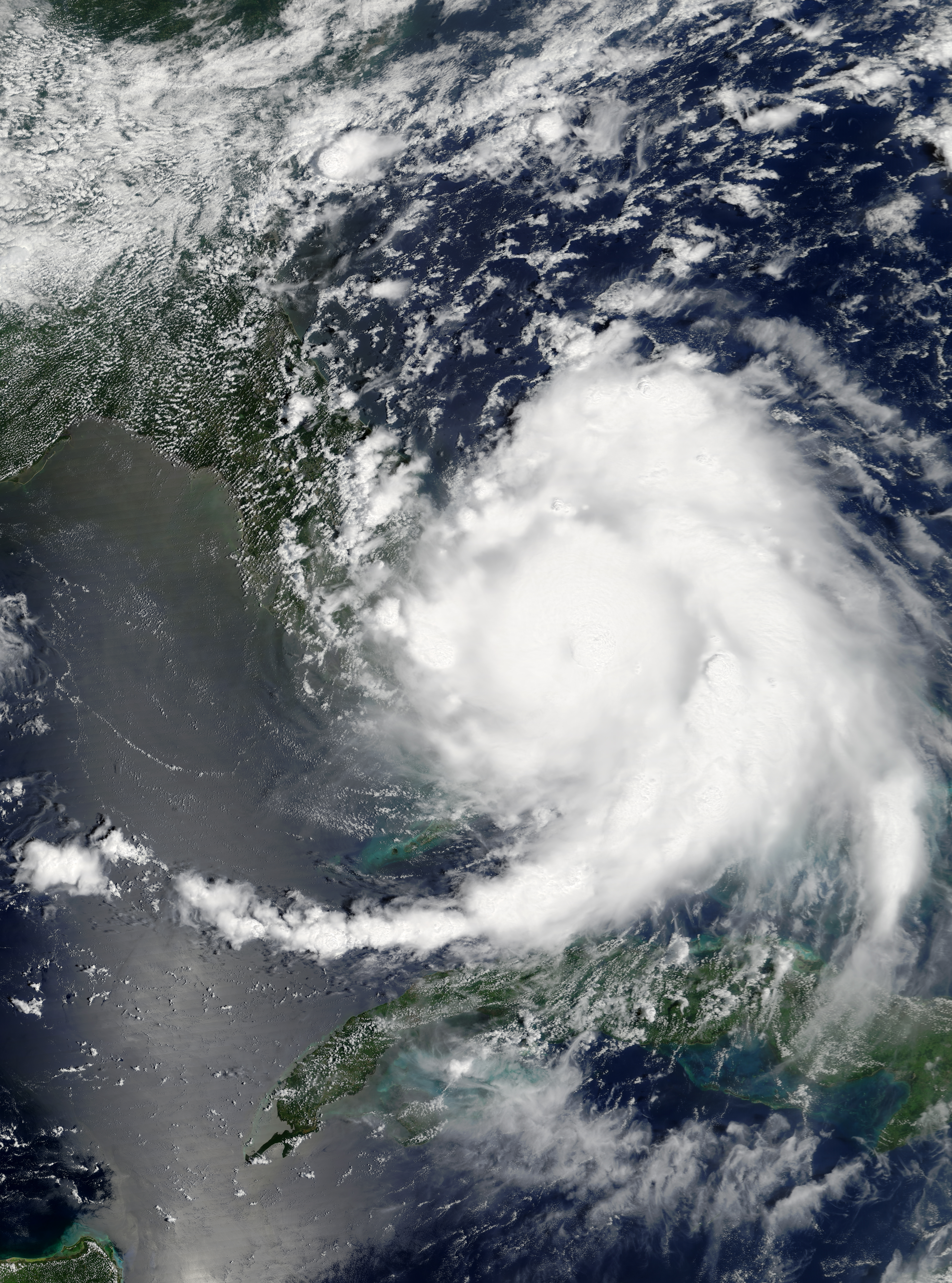
Tropical Storm Katrina approaching Florida on August 25

In the preceding 2004 season, Florida was affected by four hurricanes, including hurricanes Frances and Jeanne which hit Martin County and caused billions in damage. In July 2005, hurricanes Cindy and Dennis hit the northern gulf coast, the latter as a Category 3 hurricane on the Saffir-Simpson scale.

The origins of Katrina were from a tropical depression that formed over the Bahamas on August 23. Moving generally westward, it intensified into a hurricane, and Katrina made its first landfall near the border of Miami-Dade and Broward counties with winds of around 80 mph (130 km/h), at 22:30 UTC on August 25. It briefly weakened into a tropical storm over Florida, but restrengthened in the Gulf of Mexico, becoming a Category 5 on August 28. Katrina weakened slightly as it approached the northern gulf coast, making landfall in southeastern Louisiana as a Category 3 hurricane on August 29. Shortly thereafter, Katrina made another landfall near the border of Louisiana and Mississippi. It remained a hurricane as far inland as Meridian, Mississippi, when it weakened into a tropical storm. Katrina weakened further into a tropical depression near Clarksville, Tennessee, and later got absorbed by a cold front in the Great Lakes region.

== Preparations ==
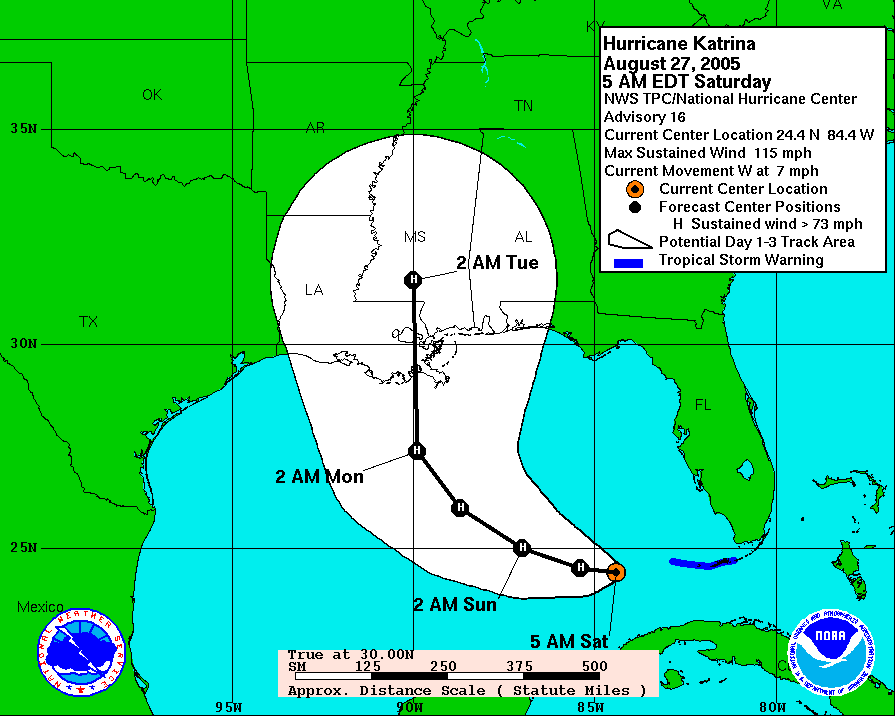
The forecast for the estimated path of Hurricane Katrina, predicting landfall near the New Orleans area

On August 24, the National Hurricane Center (NHC) first started issuing tropical cyclone watches and warnings for the southeastern United States. The agency issued a tropical storm warning and a hurricane watch from Florida City to Vero Beach, with a tropical storm watch southward to the Seven Mile Bridge. About 25 hours before Katrina made landfall, the tropical storm watch was extended northward to Titusville, and a tropical storm warning and a hurricane watch was issued for Lake Okeechobee. Early on August 25, a hurricane warning was issued from Florida City to Vero Beach and for Lake Okeechobee. In southeastern Florida, the lead time for the hurricane watch and warning occurred 31.5 and 19.5 hours before landfall, respectively; both were 16.5 hours less than the desired lead time. A tropical storm warning was also issued from Florida Key, southward through the Florida Keys to the Dry Tortugas, and northward along the western coast to Longboat Key. The warning in the Florida Keys occurred only nine hours before the onset of tropical storm force winds.

On August 25 while Katrina was over Florida, Governor Jeb Bush declared a state of emergency. A day later, Louisiana Governor Kathleen Blanco followed suit and declared a state of emergency, and on August 27, Mississippi Governor Haley Barbour did the same for his state. Alabama Governor Bob Riley declared a state of emergency on August 28. While the hurricane was still over water, President George W. Bush declared a disaster area for Louisiana and Mississippi, allocating resources from the Federal Emergency Management Agency (FEMA).

Before Katrina moved ashore Florida, schools and businesses were closed in the Miami area. Cruise ships altered their paths due to seaports in southeastern Florida closing. Officials in Miami-Dade County advised residents in mobile homes or with special needs to evacuate. To the north in Broward County, residents east of the Intracoastal Waterway or in mobile homes were advised to leave their homes. Evacuation orders were issued for offshore islands in Palm Beach County, and for residents in mobile homes south of Lantana Road. Shelters were opened across the region. Officials closed the Miami International Airport, Fort Lauderdale – Hollywood International Airport, Key West International Airport, and Florida Keys Marathon Airport due to the storm. In Monroe and Collier counties, schools were closed, and a shelter was opened in Immokalee. On August 25, Florida's Emergency Operations Center was activated in Tallahassee to monitor the progress of the hurricane.

Also on August 25, when Hurricane Katrina crossed the southern tip of Florida, government offices in Mississippi had already discussed emergency evacuation plans for days. On August 26, the Mississippi National Guard was activated, raising the level of concern, and on August 27, the state government activated its Emergency Operations Center, and local governments began issuing evacuation orders: the Mississippi Emergency Management Agency (MEMA) advised not opening shelters in coastal counties. However, on August 28, the Red Cross also opened shelters in coastal counties, and by 7:00 pm, 11 counties and eleven cities issued evacuation orders, a number which increased to 41 counties and 61 cities before the following morning, when Katrina came ashore. Moreover, 57 emergency shelters were established on coastal communities, with 31 additional shelters available to open if needed.

The NHC issued a hurricane watch on August 27 from Intracoastal City, Louisiana to the Florida/Alabama border. This was modified to a hurricane warning from Morgan City, Louisiana to the Florida/Alabama border, with a tropical storm warning westward to Intracoastal City, and another tropical storm warning extending eastward to Destin, Florida. On August 28, the National Weather Service in Slidell, Louisiana issued a bulletin predicting "devastating" damage rivaling the intensity of Hurricane Camille. Mandatory evacuations were issued for large areas of southeast Louisiana as well as coastal Mississippi and Alabama. Officials also issued mandatory evacuations for portions of the Florida panhandle.

By 4:30 am. CDT, on August 29, 2005, just hours before Hurricane Katrina landfall, many shelters in Mississippi were full to capacity, including many Red Cross shelters, the Jackson Coliseum (which allowed pets), and five special-needs shelters. The shelters had filled within 24 hours of opening.

Since the evacuation was not total, many people survived the 30-foot (9.1 m) storm tide by climbing into the second-floor attic, or knocking out walls and ceiling boards to climb onto the roof or nearby trees. Tree trunks remained standing, even near the beaches, where many houses were leveled. Other people had swum to taller buildings or trees. Over 100 people were rescued from roof tops and trees in Mississippi.

Amtrak, America's rail passenger carrier, announced that the southbound City of New Orleans passenger trains from Chicago, from August 29 through September 3, would terminate in Memphis, Tennessee, rather than their usual destination of New Orleans. The corresponding northbound trains would also originate in Memphis. The southbound Crescent from New York City, for the same period, terminated in Atlanta, with the corresponding northbound trains originating in Atlanta as well. Amtrak's westbound Sunset Limited originated in San Antonio, Texas, rather than its normal origin point of Orlando, Florida. Amtrak announced that no alternate transportation options would be made available into or out of the affected area.

The National Weather Center's (NWS) services are provided collaboratively with several different offices that specialize in certain areas regarding the weather. Some of these offices include the National Hurricane Center (NHC) and the Hydro-meteorological Prediction Center (HPC). The NHC is a component for the National Centers for Environmental Prediction, and the HPC is a provider of weather forecasts and analyses that support the NWS. Along with this, the HPC supplies the NHC with precipitation statements. After what is considered a tropical storm progresses inward on land and the NHS terminates any alerts they put out, the HPC then accepts the authority of watching over the system. The two offices work hand in hand with one another to ensure the most accurate information is released to the public.

The storm that became Hurricane Katrina was recognized by both the NHC and HPC on August 22. After waiting a few days to monitor development, the HPC started formulating precipitation statements for Hurricane Katrina on August 24. on August 30, the HPC accepted responsibility for the release of warnings regarding Katrina. On August 31, the hurricane system was consumed by a system near the Great Lakes of the east, so the HPC terminated their advisories for Katrina.

The NHC and HPC are essential to one another, especially in that the HPC routinely executes service backup for the NHC. An example of this is when the HPC conducted a respective amount of drills for service backup in the summer months leading up to Katrina. During Hurricane Katrina's landfall, the NHC's implementation and execution of policies was seen as excellent by many government emergency officials. Throughout the tracking of Hurricane Katrina, the NHC's forecasts were very consistent and provided strong evidence for the intensity and power of the storm. Not only were the forecasts made by the NHC accurate, but they were also timely, which allowed for workforce management operation members to in turn provide accurate information to their counterparts. As well as the accuracy and timeliness of the NHC's forecast, it was precisely expected that Hurricane Katrina would be a massive hurricane that caused detrimental effects to the northern Gulf coast.

Summary of tropical cyclone warnings and watches associated with Hurricane Katrina in the United States
Date	Time	Warning type	Areas
August 24	03:00 UTC	Tropical Storm Watch	Seven Mile Bridge to Vero Beach, Florida
August 24	15:00 UTC	Tropical Storm Watch	Seven Mile Bridge to Florida City, Florida
August 24	15:00 UTC	Tropical Storm Warning and Hurricane Watch	Florida City to Vero Beach, Florida
August 24	21:00 UTC	Tropical Storm Watch	Vero Beach to Titusville, Florida
August 24	21:00 UTC	Tropical Storm Warning and Hurricane Watch	Lake Okeechobee
August 25	03:00 UTC	Hurricane Warning	Florida City to Vero Beach, Florida, and Lake Okeechobee
August 25	09:00 UTC	Tropical Storm Watch	Florida City to Englewood, Florida, including Florida Bay
August 25	21:00 UTC	Hurricane Warning	Florida City to Jupiter Inlet, Florida
August 25	21:00 UTC	Tropical Storm Warning	Jupiter Inlet to Florida Keys and Florida City to Longboat Key, Florida
August 25	21:00 UTC	Tropical Storm Watch	Longboat Key to Anclote Key, Florida
August 26	03:00 UTC	Tropical Storm Watch discontinued	Vero Beach to Titusville, Florida
August 26	03:00 UTC	Tropical Storm Warning discontinued	Jupiter Inlet to Vero Beach, Florida
August 26	05:00 UTC	Tropical Storm Warning	Deerfield Beach to Florida City, Florida
August 26	05:00 UTC	Hurricane Warning discontinued	Deerfield Beach to Jupiter, Florida, and Lake Okeechobee
August 26	05:00 UTC	Tropical Storm Warning	Florida Keys including Florida Bay and Florida City to Longboat Key, Florida
August 26	15:00 UTC	Tropical Storm Warning	Florida City to Longboat Key and all the Florida Keys and Florida Bay
August 26	21:00 UTC	Tropical Storm Watch discontinued	All
August 26	21:00 UTC	Tropical Storm Warning discontinued	Florida City to Longboat Key, Florida
August 27	09:00 UTC	Tropical Storm Warning	Dry Tortugas to Longboat Key, Florida
August 27	15:00 UTC	Tropical Storm Warning	Dry Tortugas to Key West, Florida
August 27	15:00 UTC	Hurricane Watch	Morgan City to Pearl River, Louisiana
August 27	21:00 UTC	Tropical Storm Warnings discontinued	All
August 27	21:00 UTC	Hurricane Watch	Intracoastal City, Louisiana, to Florida-Alabama border
August 28	03:00 UTC	Hurricane Warning	Morgan City, Louisiana, to Florida-Alabama border, including Lake Pontchartrain
August 28	03:00 UTC	Tropical Storm Warning	Florida-Alabama border to Destin, Florida
August 28	03:00 UTC	Tropical Storm Warning	Intracoastal City to Morgan City, Louisiana
August 28	03:00 UTC	Hurricane Watch	Florida-Alabama border to Destin, Florida
August 28	09:00 UTC	Tropical Storm Warning	Destin to Indian Pass, Florida, and Intracoastal City to Cameron, Louisiana
August 29	15:00 UTC	Hurricane Watches discontinued	All
August 29	21:00 UTC	Tropical Storm Warning	Pearl River, Louisiana, to Florida-Alabama border
August 29	21:00 UTC	Tropical Storm and Hurricane Warning discontinued	Cameron to Pearl River, Louisiana, and Florida-Alabama border to Destin, Florida
August 30	03:00 UTC	Tropical Storm Warning discontinued	All
Source - Hurricane Katrina tropical cyclone report

=== New Orleans ===
By August 26, the possibility of unprecedented cataclysm was already being considered. Some computer models were putting the city of New Orleans right in the center of their track probabilities, and the chances of a direct hit were forecast at 17% (with strike probability rising to 29% by August 28). This scenario was considered a potential catastrophe because 80% of the New Orleans metropolitan area is below sea level along Lake Pontchartrain. Since the storm surge produced by the hurricane's right-front quadrant (containing the strongest winds) was more than 20 ft (6 m) near Biloxi, emergency management officials in New Orleans feared that the storm surge could go over the tops of levees protecting the city, causing major flooding. This risk of devastation had been known for some time; previous studies by FEMA and the Army Corps of Engineers had warned that a direct hurricane strike on New Orleans could lead to massive flooding, which would lead to thousands of drowning deaths, as well as many more suffering from disease and dehydration, as the flood waters slowly receded from the city.

At a news conference 10:00 am on August 28, shortly after Katrina was upgraded to a Category 5 storm, New Orleans mayor Ray Nagin ordered the first ever mandatory evacuation of the city, calling Katrina, "a storm that most of us have long feared" and also saying it was "a once-in-a-lifetime event". To speed up the evacuations, authorities used contraflow lane reversal on Interstate 10 leading west of New Orleans, as well as on Interstate 55 and 59 leading north from the city. The city government also established a "refuge of last resort" for citizens who could not leave the city, at the massive Louisiana Superdome, which housed approximately 26,000 people with food and water for two days as the storm came ashore. The Louisiana National Guard delivered three truckloads of water and seven truckloads of MRE's to the Superdome, "enough to supply 15,000 people for three days" said Colonel Jay Mayeaux, director of the Department of Homeland Security's office for emergency preparedness.

Louisiana's hurricane evacuation plan calls for local governments in areas along and near the coast to call for evacuations in three phases, starting with the immediate coast 50 hours before the start of tropical storm force winds. Persons in areas designated Phase II begin evacuating 40 hours before the onset of tropical storm winds and those in Phase III areas (including New Orleans) evacuate 30 hours before the start of such winds.

However, many parishes were not able to provide sufficient transportation for citizens who did not have private means of evacuation, and many private care-taking facilities who relied on the same bus companies and ambulance services for evacuation were unable to evacuate their charges. Fuel and rental cars were in short supply and many forms of public transportation had been shut down well before the storm arrived. The result was that hundreds of thousands of residents and tourists were unable to evacuate and remained in the city. Nonetheless, some estimates claimed that 90-92% of the 1.3 million residents of the New Orleans metropolitan region evacuated including 80% of Orleans parish. More than 80,000 people were homeless at the time.

Months before Hurricane Katrina made landfall on New Orleans, a hurricane simulation was created to warn the city of a potential hurricane crisis and its devastating outcomes. The simulation was named Pam, in which a category 3 hurricane's strong winds and flooding caused the levee system of New Orleans to fail and leave the city underwater. Many emergency officials were stunned by the lack of response to Hurricane Pam's simulation, expressing their concerns that if a disaster like this did occur, the effects would be catastrophic. It was indeed confirmed that Pam's disaster plan was seen by FEMA and Louisiana state officials, to no avail. Under Hurricane Pam's disaster plan, it was decided that preparations for the hurricane should have been happening for three days prior to the hurricane's arrival on land. In New Orleans, a mandatory evacuation was not ordered by the city until approximately 20 hours before Hurricane Katrina made landfall. On top of this, it was important that officials representing FEMA had critical resources ready to go before the storm hit the city, which they failed to do so. While it is true that the authorities of the city and state government were mainly in charge of moving people to safety, Hurricane Pam's disaster plan noted that there was a scarcity of resources in support shelters for the state of Louisiana. Shortly thereafter the effects of Hurricane Katrina were evident, President Bush made it clear that he wanted there to be an investigation regarding the government's preparedness for and response to Hurricane Katrina.

== Impact ==
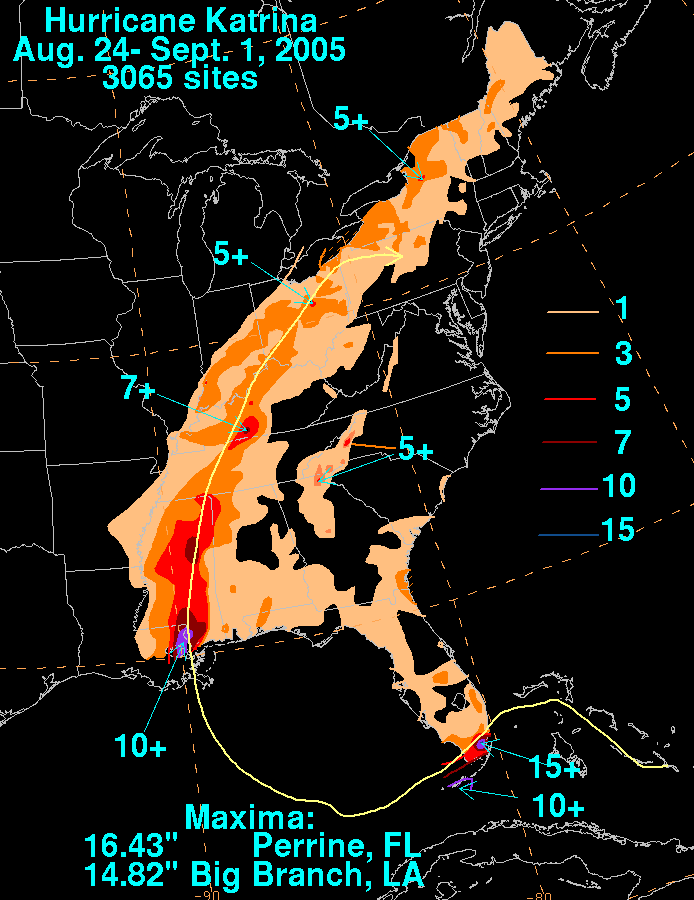
Total rainfall from Katrina in the United States. Data for the New Orleans area are not available

Across the southeastern United States, Hurricane Katrina contributed to 1,392 fatalities, making it the deadliest hurricanes in the United States since the 1928 Okeechobee hurricane. Most of the deaths were in Louisiana or Mississippi, caused by flooding. However, there were hundreds of indirect deaths, such as related to cardiovascular issues or traffic accidents. Katrina caused significant damage where it moved ashore, with monetary damage estimated at $125 billion, making it the costliest United States hurricane on record, later tied by Hurricane Harvey in 2017. Across the region, about 2.7 million people lost power due to Katrina.

=== Florida ===
Overall, Hurricane Katrina killed 14 people in Florida, of which 6 were directly related to the storm. Downed trees killed three people in Broward County. Three people drowned in Miami-Dade County, two of whom on boats. Six of the indirect deaths were in South Florida, of which three were from carbon monoxide poisoning caused by generators, one was due to a vehicle accident, one occurred during debris cleanup, and one was associated with a lack of electricity. At least five people were injured due to carbon monoxide poisoning. Overall damage totaled $623 million (2005 USD). Statewide, the hurricane left more than 194,000 people without power.

While moving across Florida, Katrina had an asymmetric area of thunderstorms, which placed the strongest winds and rainfall over Miami-Dade County. The highest precipitation total related to hurricane in the United States was 16.43 in (417 mm) in Perrine, or about halfway between Miami and Homestead. Of the total, 15.10 in (384 mm) fell in 24 hours. During its passage, the eye of the hurricane moved directly over the office of the National Hurricane Center, which reported a wind gust of 87 mph (140 km/h). The strongest sustained winds in Florida was a report of 72 mph (116 km/h) on the roof of the Rosenstiel School of Marine, Atmospheric, and Earth Science in Virginia Key. The same station recorded a gust of 94 mph (151 km/h). Unofficially, wind gusts reached 97 mph (156 km/h) at Homestead General Aviation Airport. The hurricane's accompanying storm surge was small, estimated at 2 ft (0.61 m). Consequentially, there was minor beach erosion and isolated coastal flooding. Katrina weakened into a tropical storm while moving across Monroe County. Tides reached 3 to 5 ft (0.91 to 1.52 m) in mainland Monroe County, which flooded several houses and vehicles in Flamingo in Everglades National Park. Most of the Florida Keys reported tropical storm-force winds. A station on Key West reported sustained winds of 61 mph (98 km/h), with gusts to 74 mph (119 km/h). While the storm passed to its north, the city reported a storm surge of about 2 ft (0.61 m). After its final landfall, Katrina produced a storm surge of about 5.37 ft (1.64 m) in Pensacola.

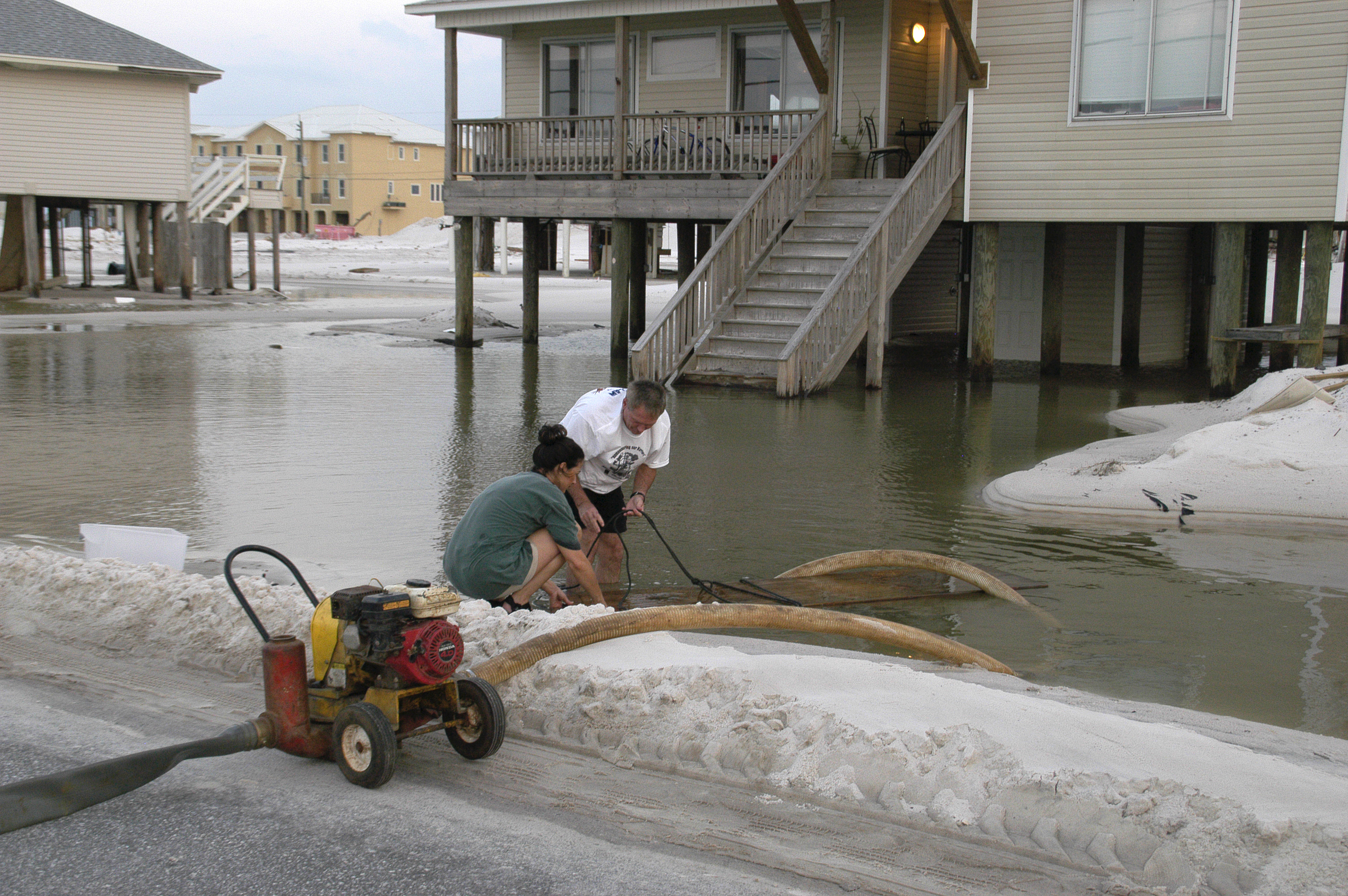
Flooding in Navarre, Escambia County on August 31, 2005

The heavy rainfall flooded neighborhoods in the area, damaging over 100 houses. The storm left about 1.4 million people without power in Palm Beach, Broward, and Miami-Dade counties. In Broward County north of Katrina's first landfall, the hurricane dropped light rainfall, ranging from 2 to 4 in (51 to 102 mm). Train and bus service was disrupted in the Miami area. Widespread flooding affected crop nurseries and greenhouses, and crop damage totaled $423 million. The storm's outer rainbands spawned an F2 tornado in Marathon on August 26, which damaged an airport hangar and several homes. This was one of only six F2 tornadoes in the Florida Keys since 1950. Similar to the Miami area, Katrina dropped heavy rainfall in the Florida Keys, reaching 10.05 in (255 mm) in Key West. In the area, the storm left about 5,000 people without power. After Katrina re-intensified into a hurricane, a station on the Dry Tortugas reported sustained winds of 82 mph (132 km/h), with gusts to 105 mph (169 km/h).

Light rains and winds spread into the Melbourne National Weather Service region. Kennedy Space Center reported wind gusts to 46 mph (74 km/h), although there was no damage or erosion in the area. In southwestern Florida, the storm produced a storm surge of 1.13 ft (0.34 m) in St. Petersburg. In the central portion of the state, some areas for pasture were flooded due to outer rainbands. The Florida panhandle was still recovering from Hurricane Dennis when Katrina moved ashore. In St. Marks, the surge flooded several businesses, and in Walton County, high tides flooded several roads, including portions of U.S. Highways 98 and 331. The storm caused moderate to severe beach erosion along the gulf coast, and washed sand onto many coastal roads. Winds along the Florida panhandle peaked at 56 mph (90 km/h) in Pensacola, with gusts to 71 mph (114 km/h). High winds briefly closed the Interstate 10 bridge over Escambia Bay in Pensacola. The outer rainbands of the hurricane spawned five tornadoes, all of them weak and not very damaging. Rainfall along the panhandle reached 7.80 in (198 mm) in Philpot, which caused flooding. The winds caused damage to some trees and structures and there was some minor flooding in the panhandle. There were two indirect fatalities from Katrina in Walton County as a result of a traffic accident. Along the Florida panhandle, 77,000 customers lost power.

=== Alabama ===
When Katrina moved ashore, it produced hurricane-force winds across southwestern Alabama. Dauphin Island recorded sustained winds of 74 mph (119 km/h), while the USS Alabama docked in Mobile Bay recorded gusts to 104 mph (167 km/h). The hurricane also washed ashore with a significant storm surge that flooded coastal portions of southern Alabama, reaching several miles inland. The Port of Mobile recorded a high tide of 11.45 ft (3.49 m), which was nearly as high as the record set during the 1916 Gulf Coast hurricane. The floodwaters inundated downtown Mobile, closing several businesses as well as the George Wallace Tunnel. Two indirect deaths were reported after a fatal car accident during the storm. Rainfall in Alabama reached 6.59 in (167 mm) at a station near Red Bay. Katrina also spawned 16 tornadoes in the state.

On Dauphin Island, a storm surge of 15 ft (4.6 m) moved ashore, destroying over 350 houses. Only 50 have since been rebuilt. As a result of the storm surge, an oil rig under construction along the Mobile River was dislodged, sending it down the river where it struck the Cochrane Bridge. Another offshore oil rig washed up on the beaches of Dauphin Island. Part of Battleship Parkway, or "The Causeway", which connects parts of Mobile Bay together, collapsed, causing a temporary closure. The strong winds knocked down trees and power lines. Over 656,000 customers in Alabama lost power, causing it to have, at the time, the second most power outages for a storm in Alabama history behind only Hurricane Ivan.

=== Mississippi ===
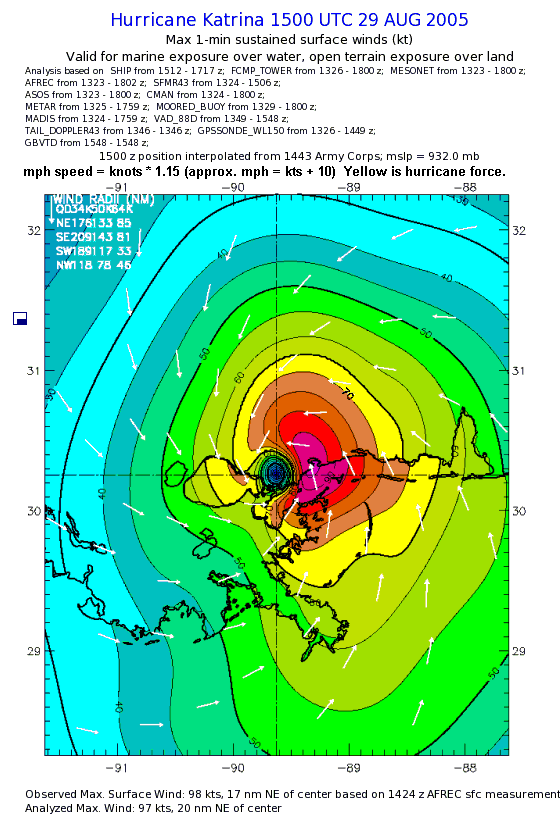
Figure KW10: Katrina Wind speed at 10 am. CDT, August 29, 2005: hurricane eye (central blue hub) a few miles to the west of Waveland, Mississippi.

Hurricane Katrina made its final landfall near the Louisiana/Mississippi border, with estimated sustained winds of 120 mph (195 km/h). Anemometers failed during the storm, leading to an incomplete wind observation record. Wind gusts reached 110 mph (180 km/h) in Laurel before the instrument failed. The highest official wind gust was 98 mph (157 km/h), recorded at Keesler Air Force Base in Biloxi. An unofficial station in Poplarville recorded wind gusts to 135 mph (217 km/h). The hurricane also produced 11 tornadoes in the state. While moving ashore, Katrina produced a storm surge along the coast that reached 12 mi (19 km) inland, with a high water mark of 27.8 ft (8,500 mm) recorded at Pass Christian. Based on the observation, the NHC estimated that an area around Bay of St. Louis experienced a storm surge of 24 to 28 ft (7.3 to 8.5 m). This set a record for the highest storm surge in the United States, surpassing the 24 ft (7.3 m) storm surge set during Hurricane Camille in 1969, also in Pass Christian. In addition to the surge and waves, Katrina also produced heavy rainfall along its track. Rainfall in the state reached 9.84 in (250 mm) in Hancock County.

Statewide, Katrina directly caused at least 228 fatalities, 172 of them directly, mostly due to the storm surge along the Mississippi coastline. The combination of powerful waves and storm surge eroded beaches and washed away entire coastal towns. The National Weather Service described the effects as "almost total destruction... along the immediate coast in Hancock and Harrison [counties]." Insured damage reached $9.8 billion statewide. The high waters washed away thousands of buildings in coastal counties, with floodwaters reaching as far inland as I-10. The tides swept barges and boats onto the I-10 bridge over the Pascagoula River, damaging the eastbound bridge. The waves also destroyed the Biloxi Bay Bridge and the St. Louis Bay Bridge, both carrying part of U.S. Route 90.

Along the coast, the floodwaters destroyed or heavily damaged all 13 casino barges, with slot machines and docks wrecked. Farther inland, heavy rainfall caused flash flooding that closed or washed out several roads near creeks or rivers.

Across the state, the high winds knocked down or damaged millions of trees, including hundreds that fell onto cars or homes. The winds destroyed roofs while also damaging windows and signs. There were at least 15 fatalities related to fallen trees. The timber industry sustained about $1.3 billion in damage. High winds and fallen trees knocked down thousands of power lines, leaving more than 900,000 people in the state without power; this represented 64% of electric customers in the state, and 97% of the Jackson metropolitan area. Power outages lasted as long as four weeks. Mississippi Power CEO described the hurricane as "the worst catastrophe in our company’s history".

The hurricane also caused significant damage to agriculture industries, estimated at $1.5 billion. The winds destroyed 300 chicken houses and damaging another 2,400, with poultry losses estimated at over $100 million. Crops sustained another $100 million in damage, including cotton, corn, rice, and soybean. Power outages and damaged levees led to $100 million in damage to catfish industries. The hurricane also killed livestock and nursery plants.

As buildings collapsed, water-tight appliances floated, sending refrigerators and dishwashers to ram other buildings and block streets. Millions of homes and buildings were affected, along with ships, boats, and more than 40 offshore oil rigs.

Roadways and railways were put out of service by excessive amounts of debris and occasional collapse. Costs of debris removal in the Gulf Coast region is estimated at $200 million. Until major roadways (US 49, US 59) could be cleared, deliverers of supplies and other emergency relief were forced to detour through highway 609 or highway 43/603, though these routes were not officially posted.

Surveying the damage the day after Katrina's passing, Mississippi governor Haley Barbour called the scene indescribable, saying "I can only imagine that this is what Hiroshima looked like 60 years ago." The mayor of Biloxi, A.J. Holloway, told the Biloxi Sun Herald, "This is our tsunami." Relief and rebuilding efforts initially focused on restoring power and clearing communities of debris up to eight feet (2.4 m) in depth.

Because of federal intent to rebuild or recover projects of the US Federal Government, the damage assessment to federal buildings in Mississippi covers actual costs: the amount needed to resume operations at market costs. The following federal projects are described in terms of damage, along with the cost to resume operations:

- $1.987 billion: as requested by President George W. Bush, for Navy Shipbuilding and Conversion; these funds will assist Northrop Grumman to "replace destroyed or damaged equipment, prepare and recover naval vessels under contract; and provide for cost adjustments." Ships were damaged in Pascagoula.
- (unknown): as increased funding for USDA housing programs which provide subsidized loans and housing repair funding.
- $75 million: in wildlife habitat restoration, for the Corps of Engineers to enhance estuarine habitats in Mississippi: following the Governor's proposal regarding oyster reef and coastal marsh restoration. The Mississippi Department of Marine Resources will assist the Corps as these projects develop.
- $75 million: for the Corps of Engineers on various coastal projects: to accelerate completion of authorized projects along the Mississippi Gulf Coast.
- $1.1 billion: to repair vital federal facilities in Mississippi, including:

$292.5 million for the repair and renovation of the VA hospital in Biloxi.
$45 million for the Armed Forces Retirement Home in Gulfport.
$277.2 million for the United States Navy to help rebuild the Seabee base in Gulfport, and the Stennis Space Center.
$43.4 million to help rebuild Keesler Air Force Base.
$45 million for the Keesler Medical Center.
$82.8 million for new Navy housing in the Gulfport/Stennis region.
$324.8 million for housing at Keesler Air Force Base.
$48.9 million for Navy housing at the Naval Air Station Meridian and at the Seabee base in Gulfport.

The cost amounts were decided for work continuing in 2006. Note that repairs include modern renovation, since it is not feasible to assess damage in terms of restoring federal buildings to the year they were built. However, the costs provide a condensed measure of the construction damage, without counting the millions of lost roof tiles, thousands of broken windows, etc.

==== Coastal counties ====
The three coastal counties of Mississippi, populated by about 400,000 people (almost the population of central New Orleans), had been mostly evacuated before Katrina flooded the 100-mile (160 km) region. Katrina's storm surge was the most extensive, as well as the highest, in the documented history of the United States; large portions of Hancock County, Harrison County, and Jackson County were inundated by the storm surge, affecting most of the populated areas. Surge covered almost the entire lower half of Hancock County, destroying the coastal communities of Clermont Harbor and Waveland, and much of Bay St. Louis, and flowed up the Jourdan River, flooding Kiln. In Harrison County, Pass Christian was completely inundated, along with a narrow strip of land to the east along the coast, which includes the cities of Long Beach and Gulfport; the flooding was more extensive in communities such as D'Iberville, which borders the Back Bay of Biloxi. Biloxi, on a peninsula between the Back Bay and the coast, was particularly hard hit, especially the low-lying Point Cadet area.

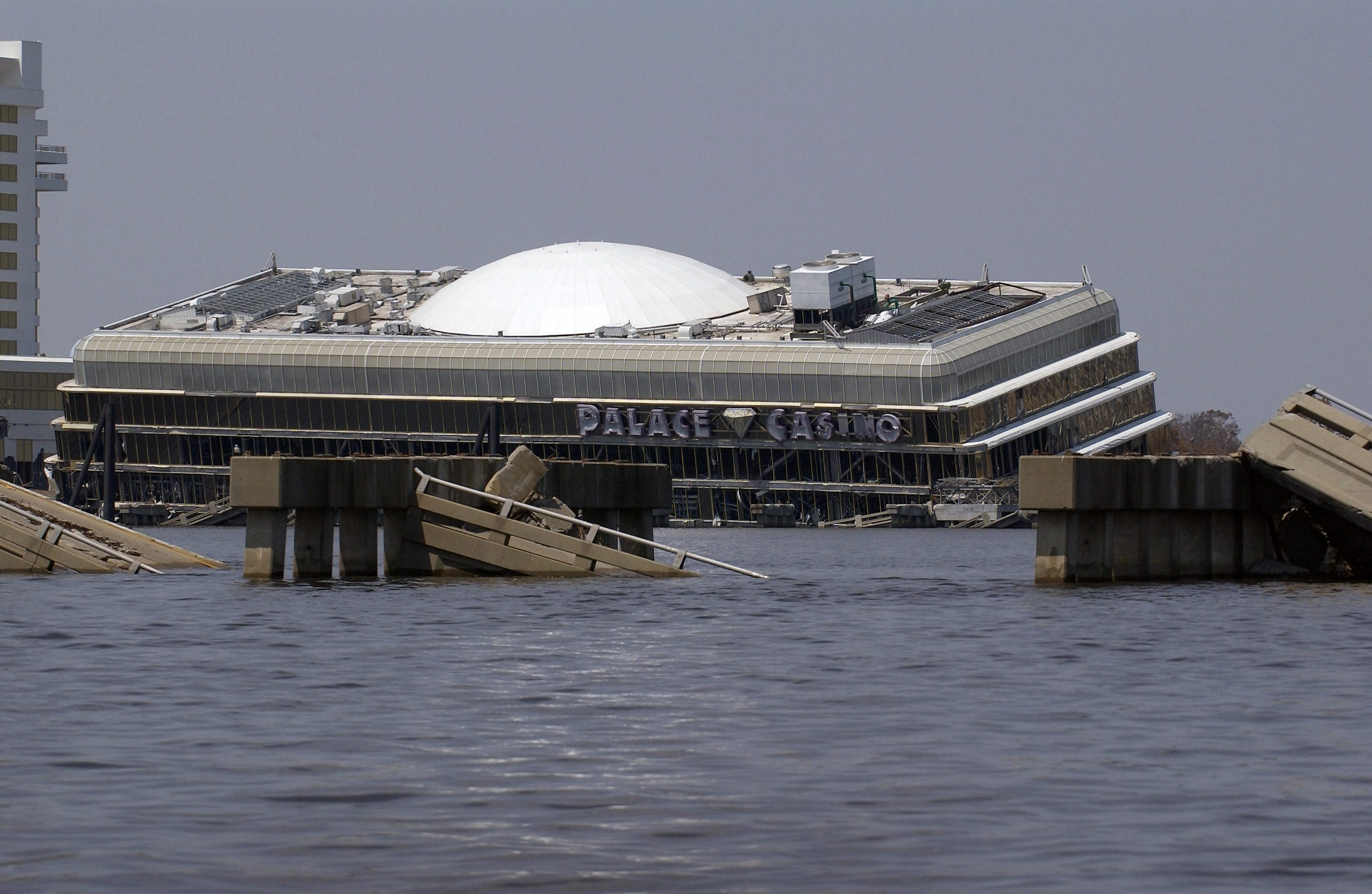
Damage to the riverboat Palace Casino located in Biloxi, Mississippi, resulting from Hurricane Katrina

In Jackson County, storm surge flowed up the wide river estuary, with the combined surge and freshwater floods cutting the county in half. Over 90% of Pascagoula, the easternmost coastal city in Mississippi, was flooded from surge. Other Jackson County communities such as Porteaux Bay were destroyed, and St. Martin was hard hit, along with Ocean Springs, Moss Point, Gautier, and Escatawpa.

Two destroyers that were under construction at Litton-Ingalls Shipbuilding in Pascagoula were damaged, as well as the amphibious assault ship USS Makin Island.

Hancock County was the scene of the final landfall of the eye of Hurricane Katrina, causing total devastation in Waveland, Bay St. Louis, Pearlington, and Clermont Harbor, as well as southern Diamondhead. The bridge between Bay St. Louis and Pass Christian was destroyed.

Katrina came ashore during the high tide of 8:01 am, raising the storm tide by 2 ft (0.61 m), to over 30 feet (9.1 m). The storm dragged away almost every structure within one-half mile (0.80 km) of the beach, leaving driveways and walkways that went to nowhere.

In Bay St. Louis, Mississippi, one foot (0.30 m) of water swamped the Emergency Operations Center at the Hancock County courthouse, which sits 30 feet (9.1 m) above sea level. Katrina also destroyed the first floor and dormitories of Saint Stanislaus College.

Harrison County was hit particularly hard by the hurricane and the storm surge. Its two largest coastal cities, Biloxi and Gulfport, suffered severe damage and a number of casualties. By September 2005 126 people were already confirmed dead. Smaller coastal towns were also severely damaged. Much of Long Beach and most of Pass Christian, which bore the brunt of Category 5 Hurricane Camille in 1969, were leveled. Nearby Gulfshore Baptist Assembly, a camp owned and operated by the Mississippi Baptist Convention, was permanently closed, and recommendations were made to build a new facility elsewhere.

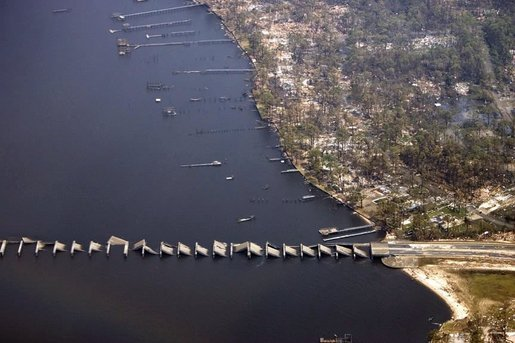
Damage to the Biloxi-Ocean Springs bridge

Residents who survived Hurricane Camille stated that Katrina was "much worse," with a storm surge reportedly reaching further inland than the previous catastrophic storm. Katrina's wind estimates were lighter than Camille's, and the central air pressure was slightly higher, but Camille was also a much smaller storm so the greater impact of the storm surge may be due to the size. Keesler Air Force Base, also located in Biloxi, reported extensive damage to its facilities. Gulfport authorities reported to news station CNN that up to ten feet (3.0 m) of water covered downtown streets. The Biloxi-Ocean Springs Bridge was also destroyed, and US 90 had heavy debris and severe damage to the roadbed.

Thirty of the confirmed deaths in Harrison County were at the St. Charles apartment complex, said Kelly Jakubic with the county's Emergency Operations Center. The apartment complex was reported, by local news sources, to have collapsed with dozens of residents inside. FOX News also reported deaths at the Quiet Water Beach apartments. (A later investigation by Biloxi's WLOX could not confirm any deaths at these apartments.

Rebuilding in Harrison County proceeded at different paces in different towns. Biloxi was greatly helped by the resurgence of the casino industry, while smaller towns such as Pass Christian did not have an economic base with which to start the reconstruction effort. By January 2007, almost a year and a half after the Hurricane, Pass Christian had still not yet begun rebuilding its city buildings, and volunteer labor was involved in rebuilding private homes in the town.

The ECHL Mississippi Sea Wolves, which play in Biloxi, was forced to suspend operations for two years because of the aftermath of the hurricane causing damage to the Mississippi Coast Coliseum. The team resumed play in 2007.

=== Louisiana ===
When Hurricane Katrina moved ashore on August 29, its strongest winds occurred to the east of the eye in extreme southeastern Louisiana. Along the coast, wind gusts reached 114 mph (183 km/h) in Grand Isle. In New Orleans, the Michoud Assembly Facility recorded a wind gust of 123 mph (198 km/h) at an elevation of about 40 ft (12 m). A station along the Lake Pontchartrain Causeway recorded a wind gust of 68 mph (109 km/h). Rainfall in the state reached 14.82 in (376 mm) at the Big Branch Marsh National Wildlife Refuge in St. Tammany Parish. The large size and intensity of Katrina pushed ashore a storm surge of 15 to 19 ft (4.6 to 5.8 m), inundating the southern coast of Lake Ponchartrain from New Orleans to St. Bernard Parish. Along the northern coast of the lake, the storm surge ranged from 12 to 16 ft (3.7 to 4.9 m), based on high water marks. Tidal gauges failed during the hurricane, leading to an analysis led by FEMA to determine the storm surge. In some areas, the hurricane left few buildings left standing to record a high water mark.New Orleans experienced wind gusts of up to 100 miles per hour and extensive flooding after levees in the city were breached by flood waters. By August 31, 2005, 80% of the city of New Orleans was underwater.

Across the state, Katrina left 890,294 people without power.In New Orleans, people were trapped in their houses and on their roofs as the rapidly rising water caught many people by surprise. The flooding and widespread damage from Katrina delayed rescue and aid efforts for days.

According to officials nearly one million people were temporarily without electricity in Louisiana for several weeks. Numerous roadways were flooded or damaged and many evacuations conducted by boat and helicopter.

Approximately 46,000 National Guard were dispatched to the area as part of the disaster relief effort. The United States Navy also announced that four amphibious ships would be sent from Norfolk, Virginia within a few days to assist the relief efforts. The US Coast Guard rescued 1,259 survivors off rooftops by Wednesday morning August 31, less than two days after landfall, and more than 1,000 the next day. In less than two weeks 12,535 flood victims were saved by helicopter. In all, the Coast Guard made 33,544 rescues by helicopter and boats. Of those, 19,000 were stranded in flooded neighborhoods in the New Orleans metro area — and 6,500 of them were picked up by helicopter. It was the largest air rescue mission in the agency’s history and one of the rare success stories in the federal response.

By July 1, 2006, when new population estimates were calculated by the U.S. Census Bureau, the population of the state of Louisiana declined by 219,563, or 4.87%.

Just as matters were beginning to improve in 2010, the Deepwater Horizon oil spill in the Gulf in April 2010 caused massive amounts of oil to come ashore in the wetlands and marshes in Plaquemines Parish and other areas of coastal Louisiana near New Orleans that had been most heavily damaged by Katrina, and the spill will likely reach other states that were also affected by the storm (the hurricane had caused or exacerbated oil spills on a smaller scale when it hit).

==== New Orleans ====
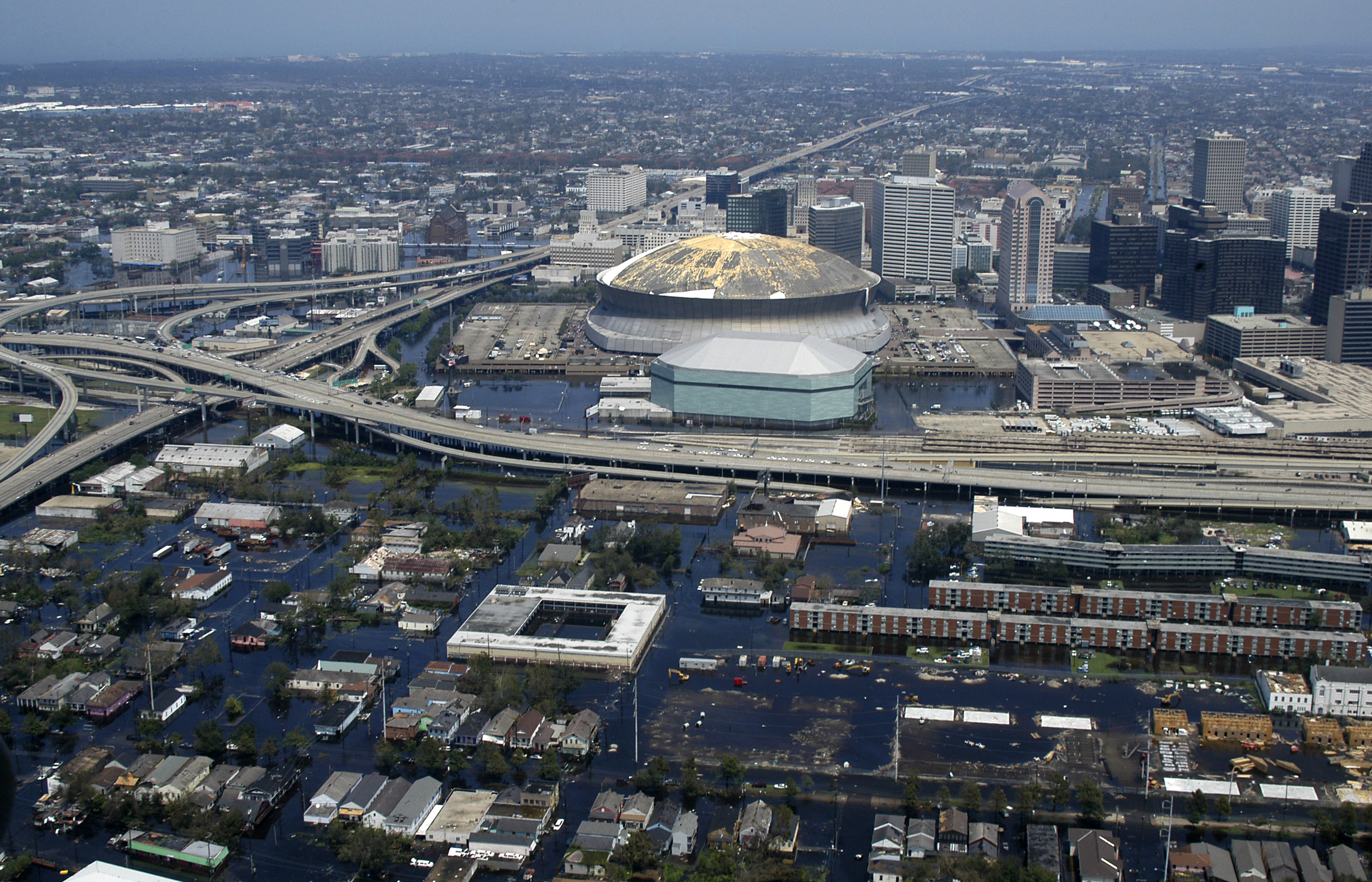
An aerial view of the flooding near downtown New Orleans. The Superdome is at center.

While moving through eastern Louisiana, the center of the eye of Katrina passed 23 mi (37 km) east of downtown New Orleans. The entire city observed hurricane-force winds, with higher wind gusts at higher elevations. The storm surge overtopped or breached the levees protecting the city and inundated about 80% of New Orleans, reaching 20 ft (6.1 m) deep in some areas. The floods took 43 days to be entirely drained, partially due to additional floods from Hurricane Rita.

Mayor Ray Nagin did not order a mandatory evacuation of the city until August 28, 2005. Approximately one million people had fled the city and its surrounding suburbs by the evening of August 28, while about 100,000 people remained in the city, with about 10,000 taking shelter at the Louisiana Superdome which had been prepared to accommodate only 800. Eventually, 30,000 arrived at the Superdome before they were evacuated. By August 31, eighty percent (80%) of the city of New Orleans was flooded by Hurricane Katrina, with some parts of the city under 20 feet (6.1 m), of water. Over 50 breaches in region's levee system were cataloged, five of which resulted in massive flooding of New Orleans. The 17th Street Canal levee was just south of the Hammond Highway Bridge. Levees adjacent to London Avenue breached in two locations: one near Robert E. Lee Boulevard and one between Filmore Avenue and Mirabeau Avenue. Two breaches also occurred in the Industrial Canal adjacent to Surekote Road. Levee repair efforts were undertaken, involving reinforcing the levees with 3,000 pounds (1,400 kg) sandbags deployed by U.S. Army Chinook and Black Hawk helicopters. The 17th Street Canal levee repair was completed by September 5, 2005, and subsequently, the three canals were repaired all the way to Lake Pontchartrain. The Army Corps of Engineers added flood gates to the three canals. Many evacuees were trapped in flooded houses and rooftops waiting to be rescued. The Superdome sustained significant damage and much of the dome's waterproof membrane had essentially been peeled off. On August 30, Louisiana governor Kathleen Blanco ordered the complete evacuation of the remaining people that sought shelter in the Superdome. Blanco instructed the Adjutant General of the Louisiana National Guard, Major General Bennett C. Landreneau to contact Honoré of Northern Command (Honoré arrived on Wednesday, August 31, as the commander of the newly established Joint Task Force Katrina to supervise federal military operations) to arrange for active duty military support of response operations in Louisiana. Additionally, General Landreneau instructed Louisiana National Guard officials at the Superdome to cease planning for the evacuation as Honoré would be "taking charge" of the evacuation project. The evacuees were then transported to the Astrodome in Houston, Texas. The only route out of the city was west on the Crescent City Connection as the I-10 (twin span) bridge traveling east towards Slidell, Louisiana had collapsed. The Lake Pontchartrain Causeway was also carrying emergency traffic only.

==== Rest of Louisiana ====
On August 29, 2005, at 14:45 UTC, Hurricane Katrina made its final landfall near the mouth of the Pearl River. The western eye wall passed directly over St. Tammany Parish, Louisiana as a Category 3 hurricane. The storm surge extended over six miles inland, impacting numerous communities, including Slidell, Avery Estates, Lakeshore Estates, Oak Harbor, Eden Isles, and North Shore Beach. The surge affected the entire 57 miles of the parish's coastline and caused significant damage, with a height of 12 feet (3.7 m) being recorded in Grand Isle. The hurricane-force winds caused widespread destruction, toppling trees and telephone poles throughout the parish. The Twin Spans of I-10 between Slidell and New Orleans East were virtually destroyed, and much of I-10 in New Orleans East was underwater. The Lake Pontchartrain Causeway and the Highway 11 bridge, connecting the north and south shores of Lake Pontchartrain, were open only to emergency traffic.

Initial search and rescue operations were conducted south of Highway 190 from Lacombe east to the state line, with over 3,000 people evacuated from flooded homes and about 300 people rescued. During the rescue period, radio communications for first responders were working, but the 9-1-1 system was down for ten days. Utility services were unavailable in the parish. However, hospitals and a special needs shelter had generator power, and the hospitals were operating at full capacity.

In the aftermath, 48,792 housing units were damaged by floodwaters and high winds. The recovery efforts, including over 6.6 million cubic yards collected and restoration of essential services, continued for at least through 2009 following the devastation caused by Hurricane Katrina.

The breach on the east side of the 17th Street Canal levee did not cause severe flooding within Jefferson Parish, but some lower-lying areas did receive significant water damage, especially on the East Bank.

The Sheriff of Jefferson Parish reported that he expected his district to remain uninhabitable for at least one week and that residents should not return to the area. Incidents of looting were reported throughout affected areas of Louisiana, most notably in New Orleans. Louisiana governor Kathleen Blanco ordered all roadways into the state closed.

By one week after the storm, residents were allowed to return to their homes to retrieve essentials, provided that they could present identification proving that they lived in the parish. They were only allowed in to retrieve essential items, and were then required to leave the parish for another month.

In Terrebonne Parish, signs, trees, roofs and utility poles suffered the brunt of Hurricane Katrina's fury when the storm roared across Terrebonne and Lafourche. Most of Terrebonne Parish and Lafourche Parish were covered with water during the storm surge, yet Houma was spared to the extent that the Coast Guard used their airport for the initial rescue launch site.

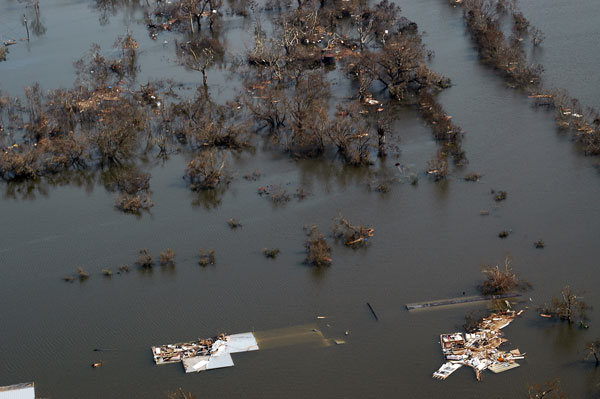
Flooding in Venice, Louisiana

Hurricane Katrina made a direct landfall in the "lower" (southern/down river) portion of Plaquemines Parish, Louisiana, the eye passed directly over the town of Empire, Louisiana. There was extensive flooding the majority of the Parish, and the southern part was temporarily "reclaimed" by the Mississippi River. All of the East Bank of the Parish was flooded, as was the downriver portion of the West Bank. Belle Chase mostly escaped with only moderate wind damage. The Belle Chasse Tunnel was flooded as well.

On August 29, the President of Plaquemines Parish, Benny Rousselle, issued a statement to all residents not to return to the parish until further notice. There were no public services available and all roads were closed and impassable. He requested that only employees in Drainage, Heavy Equipment, Public Right-of-Way Maintenance and Solid Waste departments return to the parish if possible.

St. Bernard Parish, Louisiana, which lies to the East of New Orleans and thus was closer to the path of the storm and the more exposed to the storm surge from the Gulf of Mexico, was completely flooded via water surging into Lake Borgne. A large portion of the flooding was apparently the result of levee failures along the Mississippi River – Gulf Outlet Canal, a 76 miles (122 km) canal. The levees were sized to hold back up to 17.5 feet (5.3 m), of water; they held back the initial surge, but then they were breached in several areas by the 22 feet (6.7 m), surge.

The Parish's two shelters at Chalmette High School and St. Bernard High School suffered considerable damage with flooding. Chalmette High lost much of its roof, and St. Bernard High had many broken windows. There were estimates of 300-plus evacuees at both sites.

By August 29, about 150 people were sighted on rooftops in areas that were under approximately 8–10 feet or more of water. Among those on the roofs were WDSU reporter Heath Allen and a St. Bernard resident on a government complex rooftop. Residents reported that even oil platform service boats were used to rescue survivors.

Several tragic deaths were reported at St. Rita's Nursing Home in the parish, as 35 people died due to drowning. The owners of the nursing home were arrested and charged with negligent homicide for not having evacuated in advance of the storm. However, the owners were subsequently found not guilty.

Washington Parish received significant damage due to wind damage and local flooding. The Parish is home to many pine forests in which many of the pine trees snapped or were completely uprooted. The eye of Katrina could be seen from the eastern part of the parish, in Bogalusa as Bogalusa was only fifteen miles away from the center of the eye. Much of Bogalusa was without power for weeks. Many major roads were covered by trees and were not cleared for many days. Schools did not reopen until October. As gasoline was in short supply even for emergency workers, the parish banned gas sales to the public for several days, arousing the ire of many locals.

=== Other states ===
As part of a broader tornado outbreak, Katrina spawned 18 tornadoes in Georgia, including an F2 twister that killed a man in Roopville, along with about a million chickens after destroying 17 poultry barns. This marked the first tornado fatality in Georgia in the month of August on record. The tornadoes also resulted in six injuries, with damage estimated at $12.8 million. Rainfall in the state reached 5.05 in (128 mm), enough to cause street flooding. Gusty winds caused isolated tree and power line damage across northwestern Georgia. About 12,500 people in the state lost power. Heavier rainfall occurred in North Carolina, reaching 7.19 in (183 mm) at Mount Mitchell. Rains in the state caused creeks and rivers to flood, while gusty winds knocked down trees, including at least two that fell houses.

Moving into Tennessee as a tropical storm, Katrina still had winds strong enough to knock down trees and power lines. About 100,000 people in the state lost power. In Covington, the winds destroyed a porch and some windows, while in Bartlett a tree fell onto a house. Heavy rainfall occurred as far north as Kentucky, reaching 7.94 in (202 mm) in Finney. The rains added to rains that affected the state earlier, producing flooding that killed a girl in Hopkinsville. Floods in the city affected 180 buildings, forcing residents to evacuate, including several people rescued from their cars. Floodwaters closed at least 40 roads, which closed all schools in Christian County. Two schools sustained water damage. Hopkinsville also recorded a gust of 44 mph (71 km/h). The combination of the rains and winds knocked down trees and power lines, leaving about 10,000 people statewide without power. In Calloway County, 32 roads were blocked by fallen trees. Governor Ernie Fletcher, declared Christian, Todd, and Trigg counties disaster areas due to flooding, and declared a statewide state of emergency.

== Aftermath ==
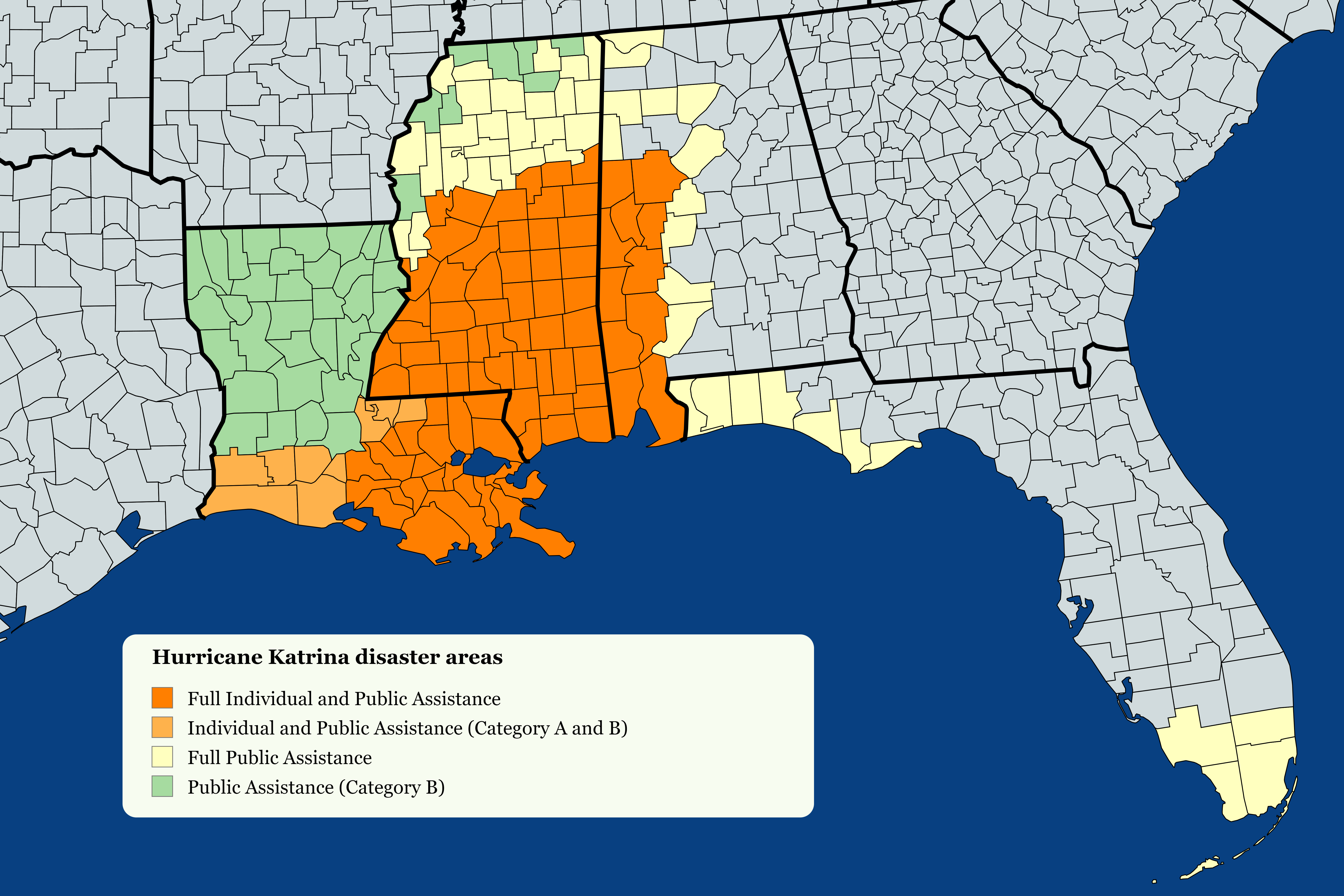
Disaster areas map: dark orange Indicates full Individual and Public Assistance, orange for Individual and Public Assistance (Categories A and B), yellow for full Public Assistance, and green for Public Assistance (Category B).

Hurricane Katrina forced about 800,000 people to move, which was the greatest number of displaced people in the country since the Dust Bowl. The United States federal government spent $110.6 billion in relief, recovery and rebuilding efforts, including $16 billion toward rebuilding houses, which was the nation's largest ever housing recovery project. In the days after the hurricane, President George W. Bush declared a disaster area for parts of Florida, Alabama, Mississippi, and Alabama. The hardest-hit areas in Louisiana, Mississippi, and Alabama were all eligible for direct public assistance, in addition to debris removal.

The widespread damage across the gulf coast led to significant economic effects. By September 2005, Louisiana had an unemployment rate of 11.8%, up from 5.8% a month prior. Over the same period, Mississippi's unemployment rate reached 9.4%, up from 7.4%. In the five counties that make up the Gulfport–Biloxi metropolitan area, the unemployment rate reached 24.3%. In the two months after the hurricane, there was a decline of 215,000 jobs in New Orleans, and by June 2005, there was a 30% decrease in the metro area's employment. By a year after the hurricane, unemployment in Louisiana had fallen to 3.5%, partly due to new jobs in construction. In the year after Katrina, Louisiana's population fell by 380,000 people, while 11,000 people from disaster areas moved elsewhere in the state. State tax revenue fell in both Louisiana and Mississippi in the second and third quarters of 2005; however, both states had recovered to pre-storm levels by the fourth quarter of the year.

As a result of the flooding in Mobile, Alabama, a curfew from dusk to dawn was implemented. Around a week after Katrina hit Alabama, FEMA approved $5.2 million into disaster aid to over 3,000 households in Alabama. Almost 550 truckloads worth of supplies also arrived in Alabama from logistical centers across the southeast.

In the two months after Katrina struck south Florida, Hurricane Rita brushed the region in late September with tropical storm-force winds and flooding rains. In late October, Hurricane Wilma struck southwestern Florida as a major hurricane, affecting the Miami area with hurricane-force winds that left 98% of south Florida without power. Including Hurricane Dennis in July, FEMA provided $1 billion in public assistance to Florida residents in association with the four hurricanes in 2005.

Rebuilding of towns took years, and some areas were not restored. The bay bridges were rebuilt taller and stronger, as had been done around Pensacola in the years following Hurricane Ivan (2004). Because all 3 Emergency Command Centers in the Mississippi coastal counties had been flooded over 30 feet (9.1 m) above sea level, the rules for command-center elevation were changed to relocate to even higher ground. Many local Gulf Coast water systems were destroyed in the storm. The state government opted to have them reconstructed as a handful of regional water systems and one large regional sewage system.

Celebrities who had previously visited New Orleans came to understand the massive devastation that occurred along the Gulf Coast cities. The US Army Corps of Engineers developed plans to rebuild the protective barrier islands that had been washed out to sea along the coastal areas. Detailed reports were written describing how people had survived by swimming to taller buildings or trees, and noting that those too old or unable to swim did not survive. Many residents moved away and never returned. Medical studies attempted to estimate the indirect deaths caused by people losing their homes or local medical support.

Both the Mississippi residents who survived the hurricanes as well as the disaster relief workers who supported them are at high risk of developing post-traumatic stress disorder (PTSD), a mental health disorder that can develop after exposure to an extreme situation such as warfare, a natural disaster or abuse.

Within a month of the storm, the damaged I-10 bridge over the Pascagoula River was repaired. The destroyed casinos left about 17,000 people without jobs. On October 17, Mississippi governor Haley Barbour signed into law a bill that would allow casinos to be built on land within 800 ft (240 m). The state's existing casinos were on barges, and were all destroyed by Katrina. In November 2007, the new Biloxi Bay Bridge reopened. By December 2007, the city of Biloxi had approved more than $1 billion in building permits since the hurricane, with 11 casinos having reopened. In February 2008, the new St. Louis Bay Bridge was completely reopened. By 2015, there were 11 new casinos along the Mississippi coast built in the decade since Katrina.
