= Howison, Mississippi =

- Unincorporated community
- Location within Mississippi Location within the United States
- Coordinates: 30°39′56″N 89°08′18″W
- Country: United States
- State: Mississippi
- County: Harrison
- Elevation: 174 ft (53 m)
- Time zone: UTC-6 (Central (CST))
  - Summer (DST): UTC-5 (CDT)
- ZIP code: 39574
- Area code: 228
- GNIS feature ID

Howison is an unincorporated community located in Harrison County, Mississippi. Howison is approximately 1.9 miles (3.1 km) north of Saucier and 4 miles (6.4 km) south of McHenry and part of the Gulfport-Biloxi metropolitan area.

Howison is located on the Kansas City Southern Railway. The Native Lumber Company was incorporated in Howison in 1899 and operated a sawmill there.

A post office operated under the name Howison from 1897 to 1953.

Howison was also once home to an express mail office.
