= Cuevas, Mississippi =

- Unincorporated community
- Location within Mississippi Location within the United States
- Coordinates: 30°21′46″N 89°13′05″W
- Country: United States
- State: Mississippi
- County: Harrison
- Elevation: 7 ft (2.1 m)
- Time zone: UTC-6 (Central (CST))
  - Summer (DST): UTC-5 (CDT)
- ZIP code: 39751
- Area code: 228
- GNIS feature ID

Cuevas is an unincorporated community in Harrison County, Mississippi. Cuevas is 3.6 miles (5.8 km) northeast of Pass Christian and 4 miles (6.4 km) west-northwest of Long Beach

Cuevas is part of the Gulfport-Biloxi metropolitan area.

== Settlement ==
Bertrand Labardens came to the area from France in 1851 and homesteaded 165 acres. He opened a post office and grocery store on the corner of Menge Ave. and Red Creek Rd. In 1893, his son-in-law U. A. Cuevas took over the store. When Cuevas applied to the government to become an official post office, he could not use the name Pineville because there was another town by that name in northern Mississippi, so he chose the name Cuevas, which is why that name is sometimes interchangeable with Pineville.
