= Bexley, Mississippi =

- Unincorporated community
- Location within Mississippi Location within the United States
- Coordinates: 30°58′00″N 88°40′27″W
- Country: United States
- State: Mississippi
- County: George
- Elevation: 125 ft (38 m)
- Time zone: UTC-6 (Central (CST))
  - Summer (DST): UTC-5 (CDT)
- GNIS feature ID: 667063

Bexley is an unincorporated place in George County, Mississippi.

== History ==
Prior to the creation of George County, Bexley was located in Greene County.

The Diamond Lumber Company opened a sawmill in Bexley in 1901. The mill was capable of sawing 50,000 ft (15,000 m) of pine per day. The company built a shortline railway running south from Bexley. The mill closed in 1918.

Bexley was a stop on the mainline of the Illinois Central Railroad.

A post office operated under the name Bexley from 1900 to 1971.

The Bexley School operated from 1913 to 1959, and was one of the first consolidated schools in Mississippi (consolidation allowed two or more rural schools to combine).

In 2010, George County Sheriff Garry M. Welford was killed in Bexley while assisting in a high-speed chase. Welford was attempting to lay spike strips at an intersection in Bexley, when the vehicle under pursuit struck him. Both occupants of the fleeing vehicle, a boyfriend and girlfriend, were sentenced to life in prison without parole.

== Public services ==
The hamlet is served by the Bexley Volunteer Fire Department.

The Bexley water system was the first rural water system in the United States that was financed by the Farmers Home Administration.
