= Bayou Caddy =

Stream in Hancock County, Mississippi, U.S.

- Location within Mississippi
- Location: Hancock
- Coordinates: 30.2385303°N 89.4242155°W
- Type: Stream
- Primary outflows: Mississippi Sound
- Surface elevation: 3 ft (0.91 m)
- References: GNIS

Bayou Caddy is a stream in Hancock County, Mississippi, United States. It is a tributary of the Mississippi Sound.

== See also ==
- List of rivers of Mississippi
