= Escatawpa, Mississippi =

Escatawpa
- Census-designated place
- The Escatawpa River in April 2021

- Location of Escatawpa, Mississippi

- Location in the United States
- Coordinates: 30°29′21″N 88°33′4″W
- Country: United States
- State: Mississippi
- County: Jackson

Area
  - Total: 6.92 sq mi (17.92 km^{2})
  - Land: 6.68 sq mi (17.30 km^{2})
  - Water: 0.24 sq mi (0.62 km^{2})
- Elevation: 13 ft (4 m)

Population (2020)
  - Total: 3,254
  - Density: 487.3/sq mi (188.13/km^{2})
- Time zone: UTC-6 (Central (CST))
  - Summer (DST): UTC-5 (CDT)
- ZIP code: 39552
- Area code: 228
- FIPS code: 28-22900
- GNIS feature ID: 0669806

Escatawpa is an unincorporated community and census-designated place (CDP) in Jackson County, Mississippi, United States. It is part of the Pascagoula Metropolitan Statistical Area. The population was 3,254 at the 2020 census.

== History ==
The community takes its name from the Escatawpa River. A post office called Escatawpa was established in 1885.

In 1990, the original center of Escatawpa was annexed into the city of Moss Point, located just to the south. The adjoining unincorporated area north of Moss Point is the current Escatawpa census-designated place. The city was devastated by Hurricane Katrina on August 29, 2005. Escatawpa is the home of the rock band 3 Doors Down.

== Geography ==
The Escatawpa CDP is in eastern Jackson County on the east side of the Pascagoula River. It is bordered to the south by the city of Moss Point. The original community of Escatawpa, now a neighborhood in Moss Point, was centered just north of present-day Interstate 10. The current CDP is 5 miles (8 km) north of the center of Moss Point and 9 miles (14 km) north of Pascagoula, the Jackson county seat. Mississippi Highway 613 is the main road through the center of Escatawpa, and four-lane Mississippi Highway 63 forms the eastern edge of the community.

According to the United States Census Bureau, the Escatawpa CDP has a total area of 6.9 square miles (17.9 km^{2}), of which 6.7 square miles (17.3 km^{2}) are land and 0.2 square miles (0.6 km^{2}), or 3.49%, are water.

== Demographics ==
Historical population
Census	Pop.	Note	%±
2000	3,566		—
2010	3,722		4.4%
2020	3,254		−12.6%
U.S. Decennial Census; 2010 2020

=== Racial and ethnic composition ===
Escatawpa CDP, Mississippi – Racial and ethnic composition Note: the US Census treats Hispanic/Latino as an ethnic category. This table excludes Latinos from the racial categories and assigns them to a separate category. Hispanics/Latinos may be of any race.
Race / Ethnicity (NH = Non-Hispanic)	Pop 2000	Pop 2010	Pop 2020	% 2000	% 2010	% 2020
White alone (NH)	2,852	2,764	2,230	79.98%	74.26%	68.53%
Black or African American alone (NH)	627	806	725	17.58%	21.66%	22.28%
Native American or Alaska Native alone (NH)	11	20	24	0.31%	0.54%	0.74%
Asian alone (NH)	26	10	20	0.73%	0.27%	0.61%
Native Hawaiian or Pacific Islander alone (NH)	3	1	2	0.08%	0.03%	0.06%
Other race alone (NH)	0	0	10	0.00%	0.00%	0.31%
Mixed race or Multiracial (NH)	26	23	142	0.73%	0.62%	4.36%
Hispanic or Latino (any race)	21	98	101	0.59%	2.63%	3.10%
Total	3,566	3,722	3,254	100.00%	100.00%	100.00%

=== 2020 census ===
As of the 2020 census, Escatawpa had a population of 3,254. The median age was 47.0 years. 18.2% of residents were under the age of 18 and 21.1% of residents were 65 years of age or older. For every 100 females there were 98.1 males, and for every 100 females age 18 and over there were 96.2 males age 18 and over.

72.8% of residents lived in urban areas, while 27.2% lived in rural areas.

There were 1,387 households in Escatawpa, of which 26.0% had children under the age of 18 living in them. Of all households, 40.7% were married-couple households, 23.4% were households with a male householder and no spouse or partner present, and 29.1% were households with a female householder and no spouse or partner present. About 28.6% of all households were made up of individuals and 12.7% had someone living alone who was 65 years of age or older.

There were 1,627 housing units, of which 14.8% were vacant. The homeowner vacancy rate was 3.4% and the rental vacancy rate was 13.2%.

=== 2000 census ===
As of the census of 2000, there were 115 people, 41 households, and 38 families residing in the CDP. The population density was 1,059.0 inhabitants per square mile (408.9/km^{2}). There were 42 housing units at an average density of 386.8 per square mile (149.3/km^{2}). The racial makeup of the CDP was 99.13% White, and 0.87% from two or more races.

There were 41 households, out of which 41.5% had children under the age of 18 living with them, 85.4% were married couples living together, 9.8% had a female householder with no husband present, and 4.9% were non-families. 4.9% of all households were made up of individuals, and none had someone living alone who was 65 years of age or older. The average household size was 2.80 and the average family size was 2.90.

In the CDP, the population was spread out, with 25.2% under the age of 18, 9.6% from 18 to 24, 30.4% from 25 to 44, 21.7% from 45 to 64, and 13.0% who were 65 years of age or older. The median age was 38 years. For every 100 females, there were 76.9 males. For every 100 females age 18 and over, there were 75.5 males.

The median income for a household in the CDP was $30,125, and the median income for a family was $30,125. Males had a median income of $22,361 versus $0 for females. The per capita income for the CDP was $10,243. None of the population and none of the families were below the poverty line.

As of the census of 2000, there were 3,566 people, 1,310 households, and 1,002 families residing in the CDP. The population density was 552.8 inhabitants per square mile (213.4/km^{2}). There were 1,434 housing units at an average density of 222.3 per square mile (85.8/km^{2}). The racial makeup of the CDP was 80.45% African American, 17.64% White, 0.31% Native American, 0.73% Asian, 0.08% Pacific Islander, 0.06% from other races, and 0.73% from two or more races. Hispanic or Latino of any race were 0.59% of the population.

=== Households ===
There were 1,310 households, out of which 35.0% had children under the age of 18 living with them, 57.2% were married couples living together, 14.1% had a female householder with no husband present, and 23.5% were non-families. 20.3% of all households were made up of individuals, and 4.7% had someone living alone who was 65 years of age or older. The average household size was 2.67 and the average family size was 3.06.

=== Ages ===
In the CDP, the population was spread out, with 25.5% under the age of 18, 9.1% from 18 to 24, 29.5% from 25 to 44, 26.8% from 45 to 64, and 9.0% who were 65 years of age or older. The median age was 36 years. For every 100 females, there were 101.1 males. For every 100 females age 18 and over, there were 97.8 males.

=== Income ===
The median income for a household in the CDP was $41,101, and the median income for a family was $48,942. Males had a median income of $35,050 versus $20,762 for females. The per capita income for the CDP was $16,850. About 5.5% of families and 8.7% of the population were below the poverty line, including 7.2% of those under age 18 and 14.0% of those age 65 or over.

== Education ==
Most of Escatawpa is served by the Moss Point School District while a small portion is in the Jackson County School District. The Moss Point district includes two elementary schools, one middle school, and one high school. Students in Escatawpa attend schools in Moss Point, Mississippi.

=== Schools ===
- Moss Point High School
- Magnolia Middle School
- Escatawpa Upper Elementary School (Grades 3–5)
- Kreole Primary School (Grades K–2)

== Notable people ==
- Brad Arnold, 3 Doors Down singer and former drummer
  - 3 Doors Down, rock band
- Wendell Davis, professional football player
- Jack G. Hanson, recipient of the Medal of Honor
