= Hurley, Mississippi =

- Census-designated place
- Location of Hurley, Mississippi

- Location in the United States
- Coordinates: 30°39′48″N 88°29′58″W
- Country: United States of America
- State: Mississippi
- County: Jackson

Area
  - Total: 5.15 sq mi (13.34 km^{2})
  - Land: 5.14 sq mi (13.30 km^{2})
  - Water: 0.015 sq mi (0.04 km^{2})
- Elevation: 102 ft (31 m)

Population (2020)
  - Total: 1,557
  - Density: 303.2/sq mi (117.07/km^{2})
- Time zone: UTC-6 (Central (CST))
  - Summer (DST): UTC-5 (CDT)
- ZIP code: 39555
- Area code: 228
- FIPS code: 28-34340
- GNIS feature ID: 0671597

Hurley is an unincorporated community and census-designated place (CDP) in Jackson County, Mississippi, United States. It is part of the Pascagoula Metropolitan Statistical Area. As of the 2020 census, Hurley had a population of 1,557.

== Geography ==
Hurley is located in northeastern Jackson County at 30°39′48″N 88°29′58″W (30.663293, -88.499558). Mississippi Highway 613 passes through the center of town, leading north 23 miles (37 km) to Lucedale and south 24 miles (39 km) to Pascagoula, the Jackson county seat. Mississippi Highway 614 forms the southern edge of Hurley, leading west 4 miles (6 km) to Wade and east 5 miles (8 km) to the Alabama border.

According to the United States Census Bureau, the Hurley CDP has a total area of 5.1 square miles (13.3 km^{2}), of which 0.02 square miles (0.04 km^{2}), or 0.30%, are water.

== Demographics ==
Historical population
Census	Pop.	Note	%±
2000	985		—
2010	1,551		57.5%
2020	1,557		0.4%
U.S. Decennial Census

Hurley was first listed as a census designated place in the 2000 U.S. census.

=== Racial and ethnic composition ===
Hurley CDP, Mississippi – Racial and ethnic composition Note: the US Census treats Hispanic/Latino as an ethnic category. This table excludes Latinos from the racial categories and assigns them to a separate category. Hispanics/Latinos may be of any race.
Race / Ethnicity (NH = Non-Hispanic)	Pop 2000	Pop 2010	Pop 2020	% 2000	% 2010	% 2020
White alone (NH)	959	1,482	1,445	97.36%	95.55%	92.81%
Black or African American alone (NH)	9	24	22	0.91%	1.55%	1.41%
Native American or Alaska Native alone (NH)	0	10	0	0.00%	0.64%	0.00%
Asian alone (NH)	5	1	3	0.51%	0.06%	0.19%
Native Hawaiian or Pacific Islander alone (NH)	0	0	0	0.00%	0.00%	0.00%
Other race alone (NH)	0	0	2	0.00%	0.00%	0.13%
Mixed race or Multiracial (NH)	12	21	56	1.22%	1.35%	3.60%
Hispanic or Latino (any race)	0	13	29	0.00%	0.84%	1.86%
Total	985	1,551	1,557	100.00%	100.00%	100.00%

=== 2020 census ===
As of the 2020 census, Hurley had a population of 1,557. The median age was 38.8 years. 26.6% of residents were under the age of 18 and 13.7% of residents were 65 years of age or older. For every 100 females there were 99.9 males, and for every 100 females age 18 and over there were 100.2 males age 18 and over.

0.0% of residents lived in urban areas, while 100.0% lived in rural areas.

There were 550 households and 362 families in Hurley, of which 38.5% had children under the age of 18 living in them. Of all households, 62.7% were married-couple households, 14.2% were households with a male householder and no spouse or partner present, and 19.5% were households with a female householder and no spouse or partner present. About 19.6% of all households were made up of individuals and 7.8% had someone living alone who was 65 years of age or older.

There were 588 housing units, of which 6.5% were vacant. The homeowner vacancy rate was 2.2% and the rental vacancy rate was 5.6%.

=== 2000 census ===
As of the census of 2000, there were 985 people, 331 households, and 278 families residing in the CDP. The population density was 191.2 inhabitants per square mile (73.8/km^{2}). There were 348 housing units at an average density of 67.6 per square mile (26.1/km^{2}). The racial makeup of the CDP was 97.36% White, 0.91% African American, 0.51% Asian, and 1.22% from two or more races.

There were 331 households, out of which 43.8% had children under the age of 18 living with them, 69.5% were married couples living together, 11.8% had a female householder with no husband present, and 16.0% were non-families. 13.9% of all households were made up of individuals, and 6.9% had someone living alone who was 65 years of age or older. The average household size was 2.96 and the average family size was 3.27.

In the CDP, the population was spread out, with 29.2% under the age of 18, 8.4% from 18 to 24, 29.2% from 25 to 44, 24.2% from 45 to 64, and 8.9% who were 65 years of age or older. The median age was 35 years. For every 100 females, there were 89.8 males. For every 100 females age 18 and over, there were 89.9 males.

The median income for a household in the CDP was $46,042, and the median income for a family was $50,909. Males had a median income of $51,136 versus $20,326 for females. The per capita income for the CDP was $18,761. About 6.2% of families and 6.9% of the population were below the poverty line, including 7.7% of those under age 18 and 7.9% of those age 65 or over.

== Public safety ==
=== Fire department ===
The North East Jackson County Fire Department provides fire protection for the community.

=== Law enforcement ===
The Jackson County Sheriff's Office provides law enforcement services for the community.

== Education ==
Hurley is served by the Jackson County School District. It includes two elementary schools, one middle school, and one high school.

=== Elementary schools ===
- East Central Lower Elementary School
- East Central Upper Elementary School

=== Middle school ===
- East Central Middle School

=== High school ===
- East Central High School, the 2017/2018 South State Football Champions
