= Wade, Mississippi =

- Census-designated place
- Location of Wade, Mississippi

- Location in the United States
- Coordinates: 30°38′31″N 88°33′4″W
- Country: United States
- State: Mississippi
- County: Jackson

Area
  - Total: 6.19 sq mi (16.04 km^{2})
  - Land: 6.17 sq mi (15.97 km^{2})
  - Water: 0.027 sq mi (0.07 km^{2})
- Elevation: 43 ft (13 m)

Population (2020)
  - Total: 996
  - Density: 161.5/sq mi (62.37/km^{2})
- Time zone: UTC-6 (Central (CST))
  - Summer (DST): UTC-5 (CDT)
- ZIP code: 39567
- Area code: 228
- FIPS code: 28-77080
- GNIS feature ID: 0692298

Wade is an unincorporated community and census-designated place (CDP) in Jackson County, Mississippi, United States. It is part of the Pascagoula Metropolitan Statistical Area. As of the 2020 census, Wade had a population of 996.

== Geography ==
Wade is located in northeastern Jackson County at 30°38′31″N 88°33′4″W (30.641942, -88.551069), around the intersection of Mississippi Highway 63 and Mississippi Highway 614. Highway 63 leads north 21 miles (34 km) to Lucedale and south 22 miles (35 km) to Pascagoula, the Jackson county seat. Highway 614 leads east 5 miles (8 km) to Hurley and west 10 miles (16 km) to Mississippi Highway 57 north of Vancleave.

According to the United States Census Bureau, the Wade CDP has a total area of 6.2 square miles (16.0 km^{2}), of which 0.03 square miles (0.07 km^{2}), or 0.44%, are water.

== Demographics ==
Historical population
| Census | Pop. | Note | %± |
|---|---|---|---|
| 2000 | 491 | | — |
| 2010 | 1,074 | | 118.7% |
| 2020 | 996 | | −7.3% |
U.S. Decennial Census

Wade was first listed as a census designated place in the 2000 U.S. census.

=== 2020 census ===
Wade racial composition
| Race | Num. | Perc. |
|---|---|---|
| White (non-Hispanic) | 932 | 93.57% |
| Black or African American (non-Hispanic) | 13 | 1.31% |
| Native American | 3 | 0.3% |
| Asian | 5 | 0.5% |
| Other/Mixed | 37 | 3.71% |
| Hispanic or Latino | 6 | 0.6% |

As of the 2020 United States census, there were 996 people, 483 households, and 288 families residing in the CDP.

=== 2000 census ===
At the 2000 census, there were 491 people, 169 households and 147 families residing in the CDP. The population density was 112.6 inhabitants per square mile (43.5/km^{2}). There were 174 housing units at an average density of 39.9 per square mile (15.4/km^{2}). The racial makeup of the CDP was 96.95% White, 1.02% African American, 0.20% Asian, 0.81% Pacific Islander, 0.20% from other races, and 0.81% from two or more races. Hispanic or Latino of any race were 0.20% of the population.

There were 169 households, of which 45.0% had children under the age of 18 living with them, 76.3% were married couples living together, 5.9% had a female householder with no husband present, and 13.0% were non-families. 11.2% of all households were made up of individuals, and 3.0% had someone living alone who was 65 years of age or older. The average household size was 2.91 and the average family size was 3.15.

29.3% of the populationwere under the age of 18, 6.3% from 18 to 24, 31.4% from 25 to 44, 25.3% from 45 to 64, and 7.7% who were 65 years of age or older. The median age was 34 years. For every 100 females, there were 101.2 males. For every 100 females age 18 and over, there were 105.3 males.

The median household income was $50,972 and the median family income was $60,982. Males had a median income of $45,673 compared with $23,000 for females. The per capita income for the CDP was $15,993. About 4.5% of families and 2.7% of the population were below the poverty line, including none of those under age 18 and 16.3% of those age 65 or over.

== Education ==
Wade is served by the Jackson County School District. It includes two elementary schools, one middle school, and one high school. Students in Wade attend schools in Hurley, Mississippi.

=== Elementary schools ===
- East Central Lower Elementary School
- East Central Upper Elementary School

=== Middle school ===
- East Central Middle School

=== High school ===
- East Central High School

== Notable people ==
- The band Taylor Red, formerly known as the Red Roots, was formed here consisting of sisters Nika, Natalie, and Nicole Taylor
- Terry Wells, former National Football League running back
