= Agricola, Mississippi =

- Census-designated place
- Location within Mississippi Location within the United States
- Coordinates: 30°48′28″N 88°31′12″W
- Country: United States
- State: Mississippi
- County: George

Area
  - Total: 1.50 sq mi (3.89 km^{2})
  - Land: 1.49 sq mi (3.87 km^{2})
  - Water: 0.0039 sq mi (0.01 km^{2})
- Elevation: 230 ft (70 m)

Population (2020)
  - Total: 346
  - Density: 231.3/sq mi (89.29/km^{2})
- Time zone: UTC-6 (Central (CST))
  - Summer (DST): UTC-5 (CDT)
- Area codes: 601 & 769
- FIPS code: 28-00460
- GNIS feature ID: 666164

Agricola is a census-designated place and unincorporated community in George County, Mississippi. Per the 2020 Census, the population was 346.

Agricola is home to Agricola Elementary School (AES). Agricola was a station on the Pascagoula Northern Railroad.

A post office operated under the name Agricola from 1909 to 1964.

== Demographics ==
Historical population
Census	Pop.	Note	%±
2020	346		—
U.S. Decennial Census; 2020

Agricola first appeared as a census designated place in the 2020 U.S. census.

Agricola CDP, Mississippi – Racial and ethnic composition Note: the US Census treats Hispanic/Latino as an ethnic category. This table excludes Latinos from the racial categories and assigns them to a separate category. Hispanics/Latinos may be of any race.
Race / Ethnicity (NH = Non-Hispanic)	Pop 2020	% 2020
White alone (NH)	308	89.02%
Black or African American alone (NH)	5	1.45%
Native American or Alaska Native alone (NH)	0	0.00%
Asian alone (NH)	0	0.00%
Native Hawaiian or Pacific Islander alone (NH)	0	0.00%
Other race alone (NH)	2	0.58%
Mixed race or Multiracial (NH)	15	4.34%
Hispanic or Latino (any race)	16	4.62%
Total	346	100.00%
