= Escatawpa River =

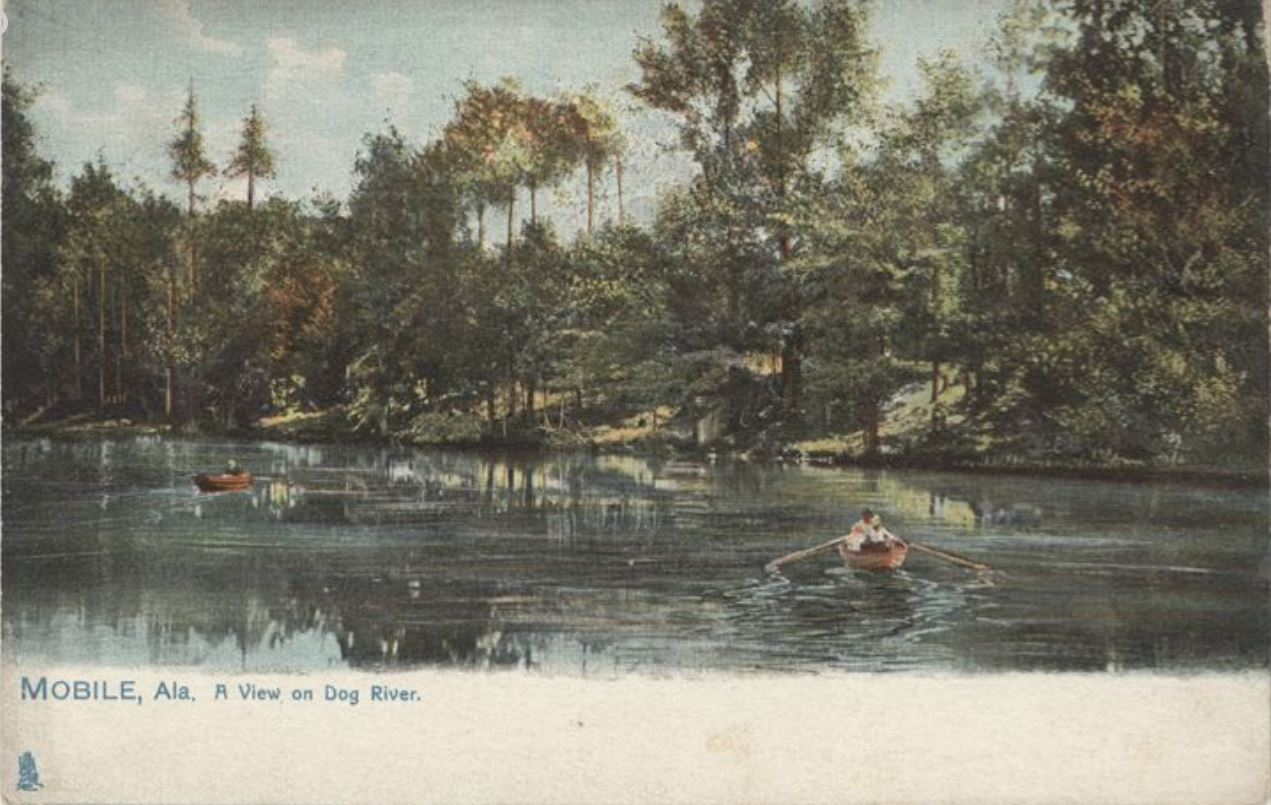
- 1909 postcard of Escatawpa River (labeled as Dog River)

Physical characteristics
- Source
  - location: Washington County southwest of Millry, Alabama
  - coordinates: 31°34′01″N 88°25′41″W
  - elevation: 290 ft (88 m)
- Mouth
  - location: Confluence with the Pascagoula River northwest of Pascagoula, Mississippi
  - coordinates: 30°25′19″N 88°33′35″W
  - elevation: 3 ft (0.91 m)

Basin features
- Progression: Escatawpa River → Pascagoula River → Gulf of Mexico
- GNIS ID: 669807

Escatawpa River is a 129-mile-long (208 km) river in the states of Alabama and Mississippi. It is a tributary of the Pascagoula River.

Escatawpa is a name derived from the Choctaw language meaning "where cane is cut".

== See also ==
- List of rivers of Alabama
- List of rivers of Mississippi
