= Manlius Pebble Hill School =

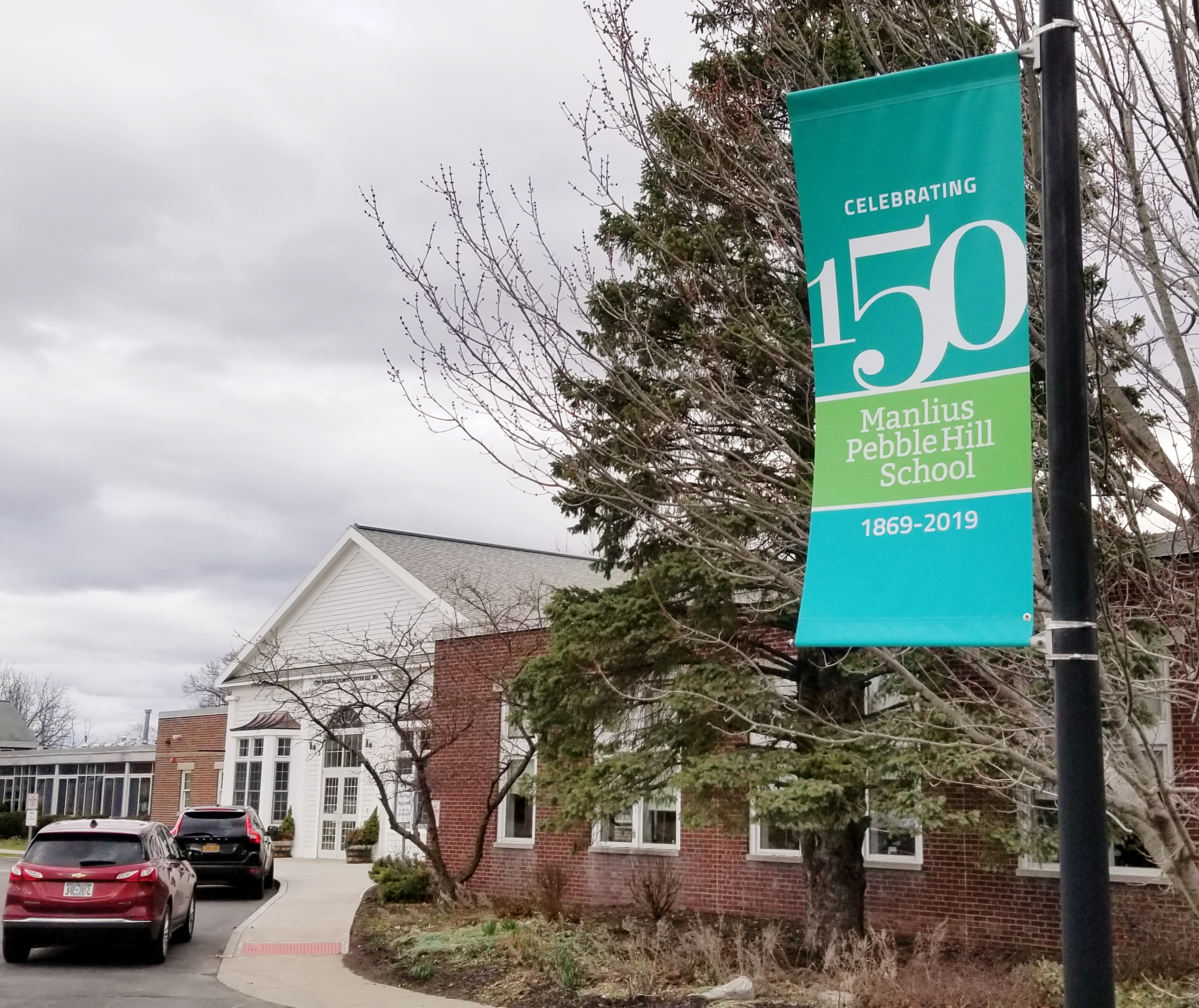

Location
- 5300 Jamesville Road; DeWitt, NY; United States; 43.0280°N 76.0698°W

Information
- Type: Independent primary & secondary
- Motto: Manners Makyth Man
- Established: 1869 (As St. John's Academy)
- Founder: Bishop Frederic D. Huntington
- Head of School: James P. Foley
- Faculty: 70
- Grades: Pre-Kindergarten to 12
- Enrollment: 314
- Campus: Suburban
- Colors: Red and white
- Nickname: Trojans
- Accreditation: New York State Association of Independent Schools
- Publication: The Pebble
- Website: www.mphschool.org

The Manlius Pebble Hill School (MPH) is a secular, coeducational, independent, pre-K through 12 school in DeWitt, New York. The school is the result of a merger in 1970 between The Manlius School, founded in 1869, and the Pebble Hill School, established in 1926. MPH marked its 150th anniversary in 2019. MPH is accredited by the New York State Association of Independent Schools, of which it is a founding member, and is also a member of the National Association of Independent Schools.

== History ==
=== The Manlius School ===
The Manlius School was founded in Manlius, New York, in 1869, as St. John's Academy, a nonsectarian school, by the Episcopal Bishop of New York, in the former Manlius Academy (started in 1835) buildings. However, by 1880, attendance had fallen to the point where the school became insolvent. The school added some military training to the program in 1881.

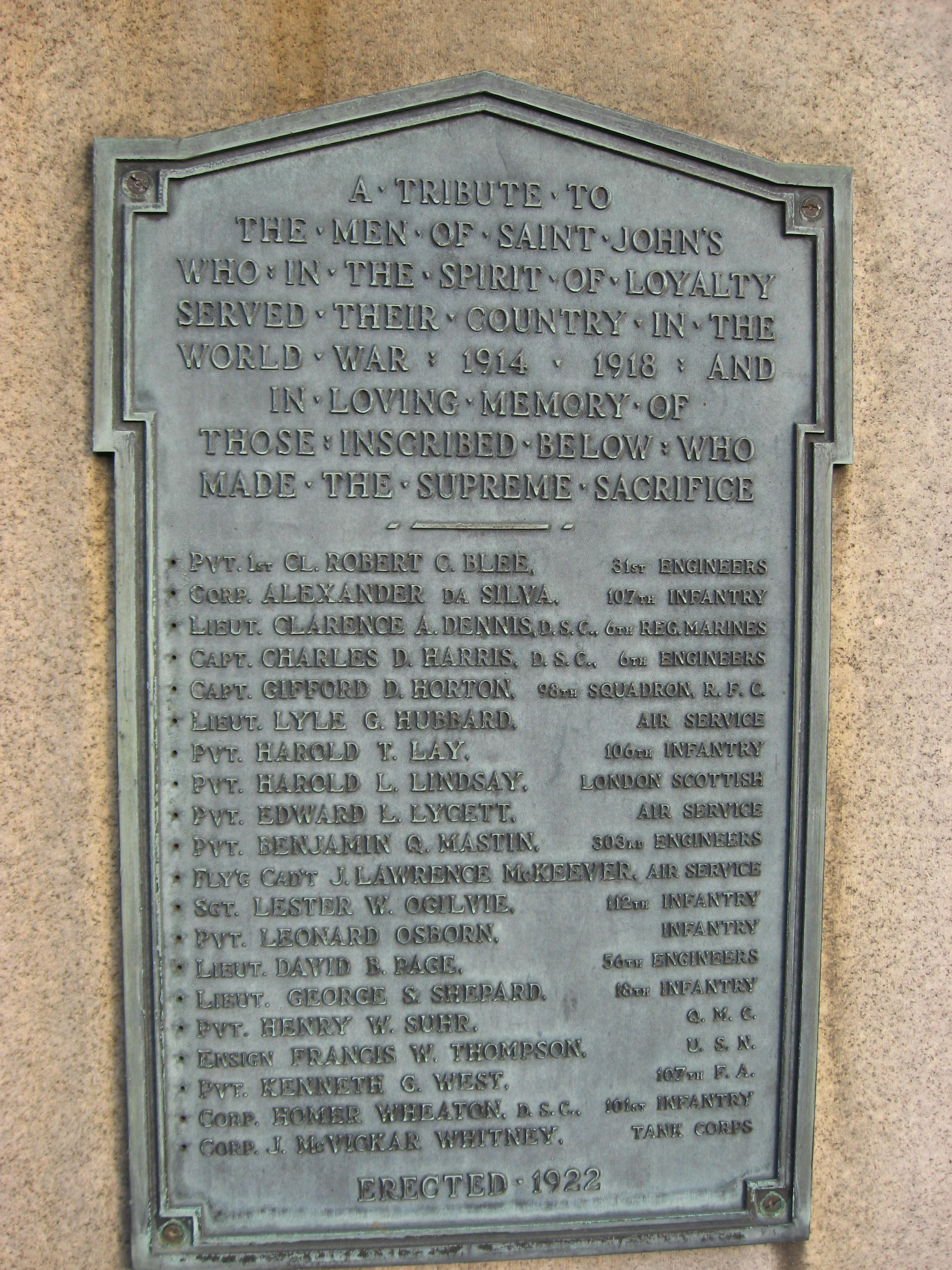
WWI memorial plaque, St. John's Academy, 1922.

By 1887, the reorganized St. John's again found itself with enrollment and financial problems, and the trustees looked for someone who could not only turn the school around, but also assume all financial risks. The school was renamed in 1888 to The Manlius School, while the Episcopal Bishop remained as chairman of the board of trustees. This person was Colonel William Verbeck, who served as school president until his appointment as New York State Adjutant General on June 1, 1910. Starting with 18 returning students, he raised enrollment to 120 within five years. By 1914, the school was effectively split into two internal school units; St. John's, the high school and Verbeck Hall, ages 10 to 14. By the time of Verbeck's death in 1930, The Manlius School had become one of the top military schools in the United States. His son, Guido Fridolin Verbeck, succeeded him as commandant of the school. By 1969, rumors indicated that the school was in financial troubles.

=== Pebble Hill School ===
The Pebble Hill School was founded in 1927 as a non-sectarian country day school for boys. A piece of property in the Pebble Hill area of Orville (now part of the Town of DeWitt) was purchased, and the school opened on September 20, 1927, with an enrollment of 49 students.

Prior to 1929, all classes at Pebble Hill were held in what still is known as "the Farmhouse." This building is the basis for MPH's logo and now houses the school's administrative offices. Built in 1832, the MPH Farmhouse is one of the oldest buildings in the Town of DeWitt.

=== Merger ===
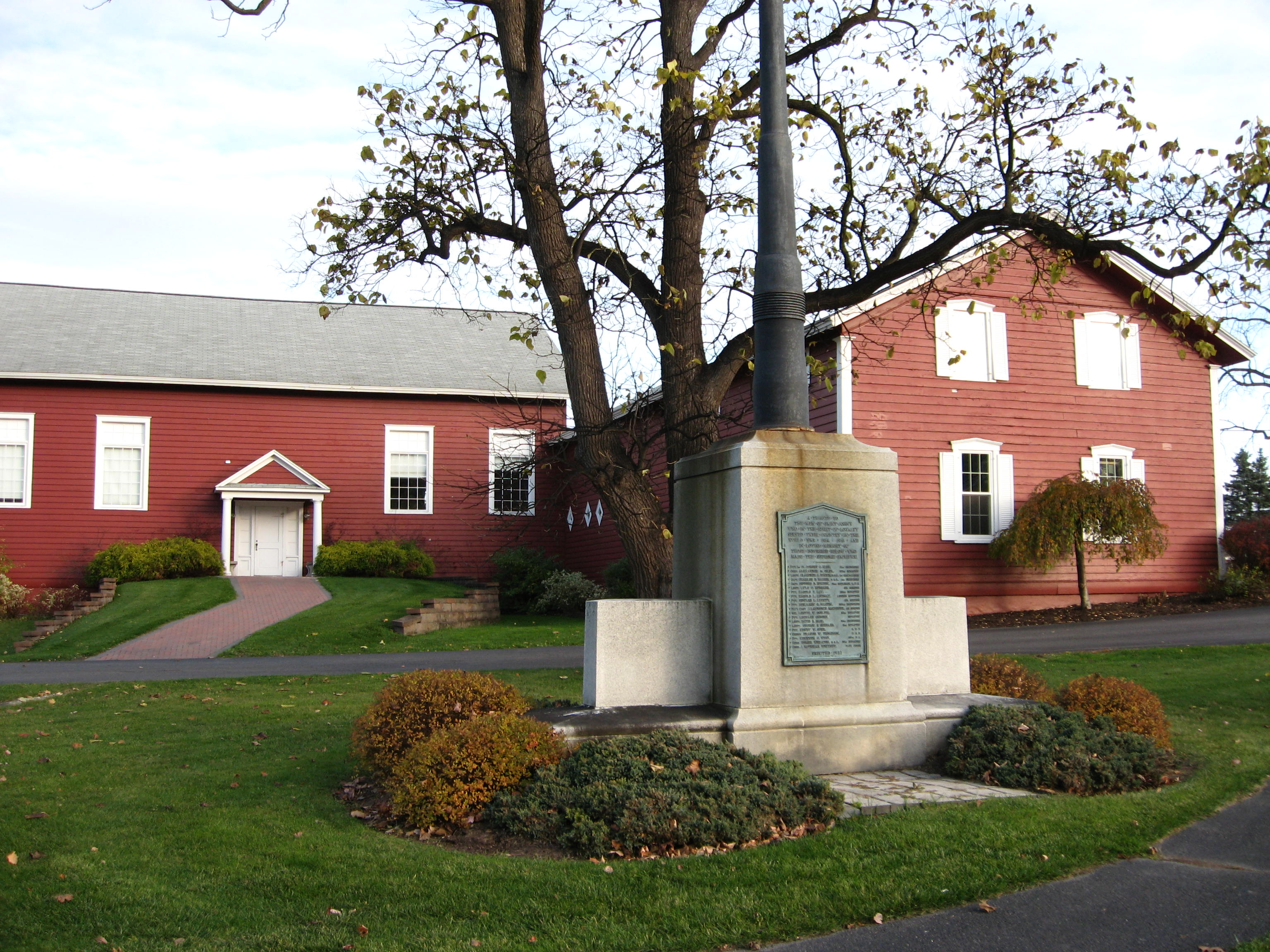
"The Barn," MPH's performing arts building; St. John's Academy memorial (foreground).

Enrollment at military schools fell off in the late 1960s, as disenchantment grew with the Vietnam War. The Manlius School did not escape this trend, and financial difficulties again were on the school's horizon. At the same time, Pebble Hill was running out of room for the many students who were enrolled there. In 1970 the two schools merged to become Manlius Pebble Hill School.

At first the newly merged school used both campuses, with the DeWitt campus used for the Lower and Middle Schools, and the Manlius campus for the Upper School. However, by 1973 it became impractical to run two campuses. The Manlius campus was shut down beginning with the 1973-74 school year and all classes were moved to the DeWitt campus; the Class of 1974 was the last whose commencement was in Knox Hall, on the Manlius campus. The Manlius campus was sold in 1979 to a private developer.

== Today ==
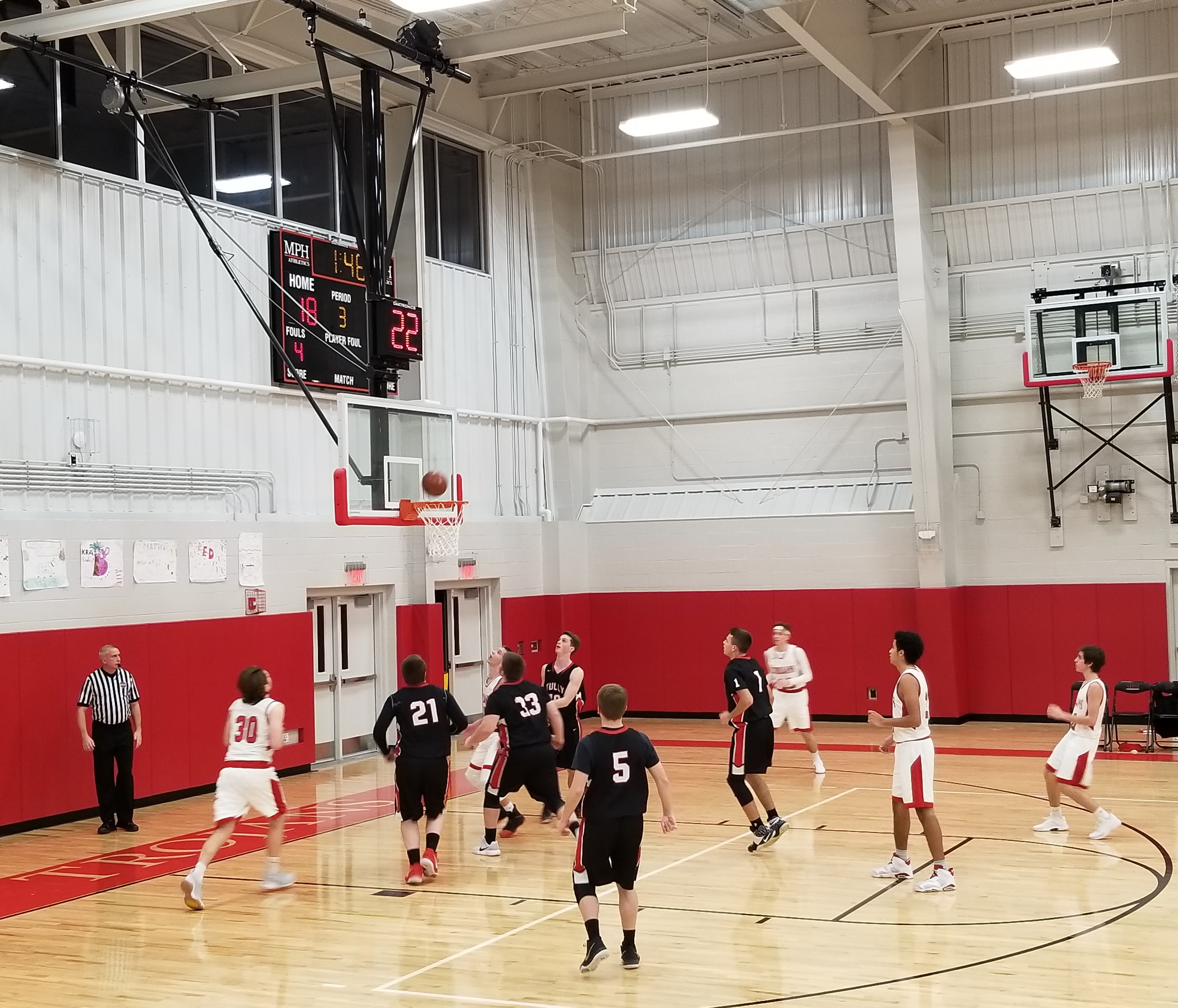
MPH's new gymnasium, arts, and administration building, 2018

Today Manlius Pebble Hill School has an enrollment of roughly 314 students and counts members of both predecessor schools as well as those who attended MPH among its more than 4,600 alumni. It is accredited by the New York State Association of Independent Schools, of which MPH is a founding institutional member. In 2019, the school is ranked by Niche.com as the #1 private school in the Syracuse, New York, area.

== Buildings ==
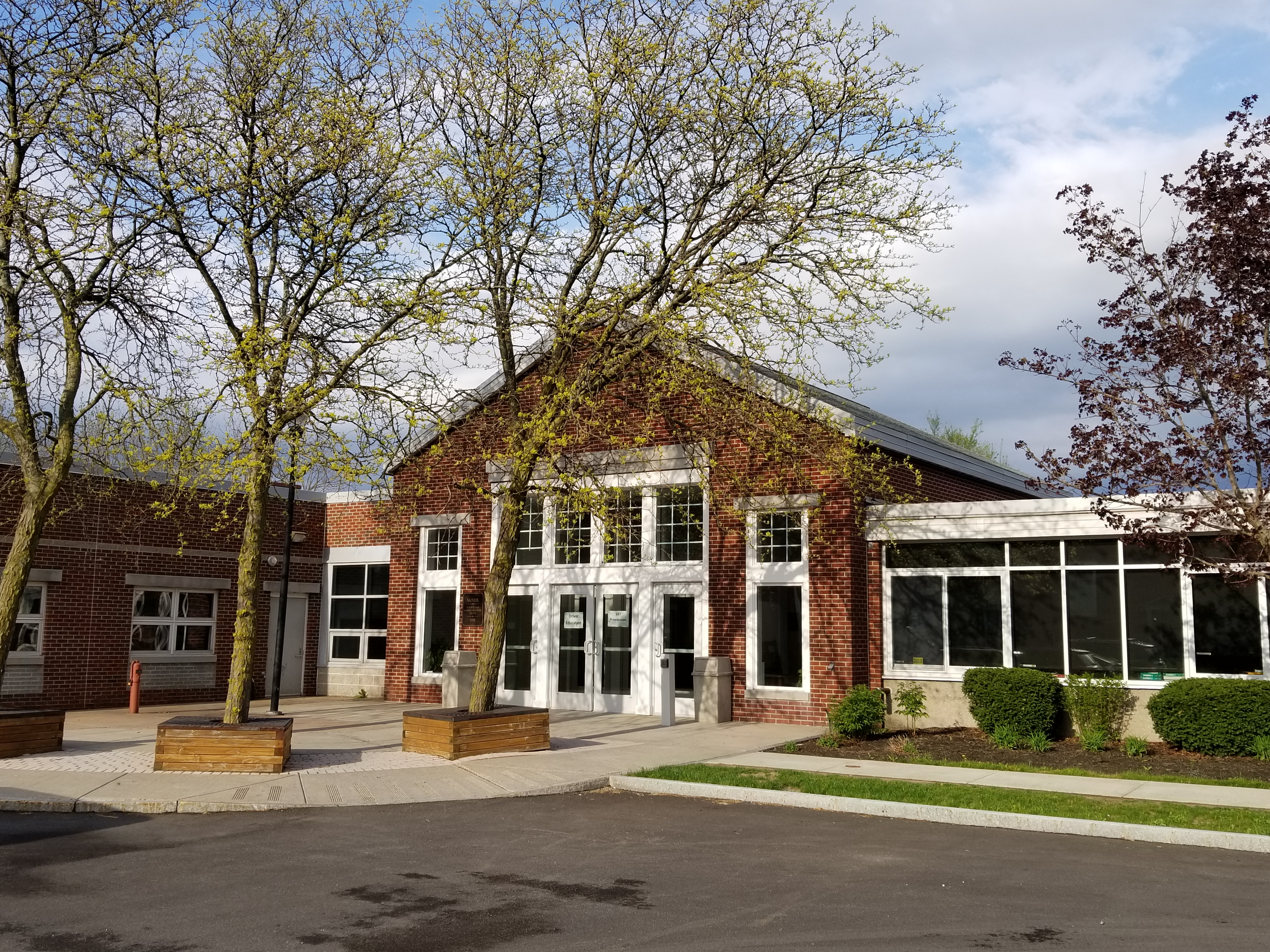
McNeil Science and Communications Center

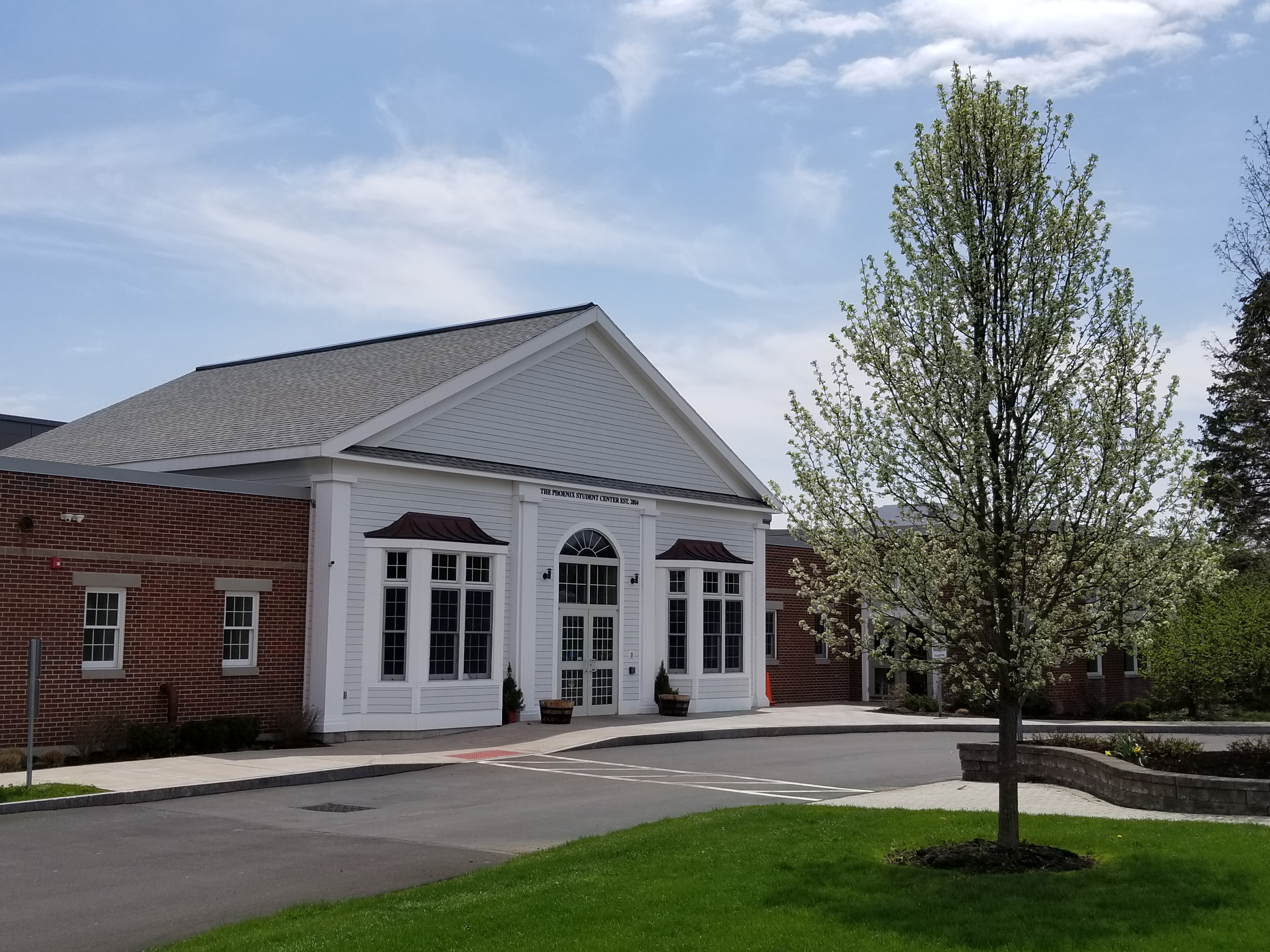
Phoenix Student Center (main entrance)

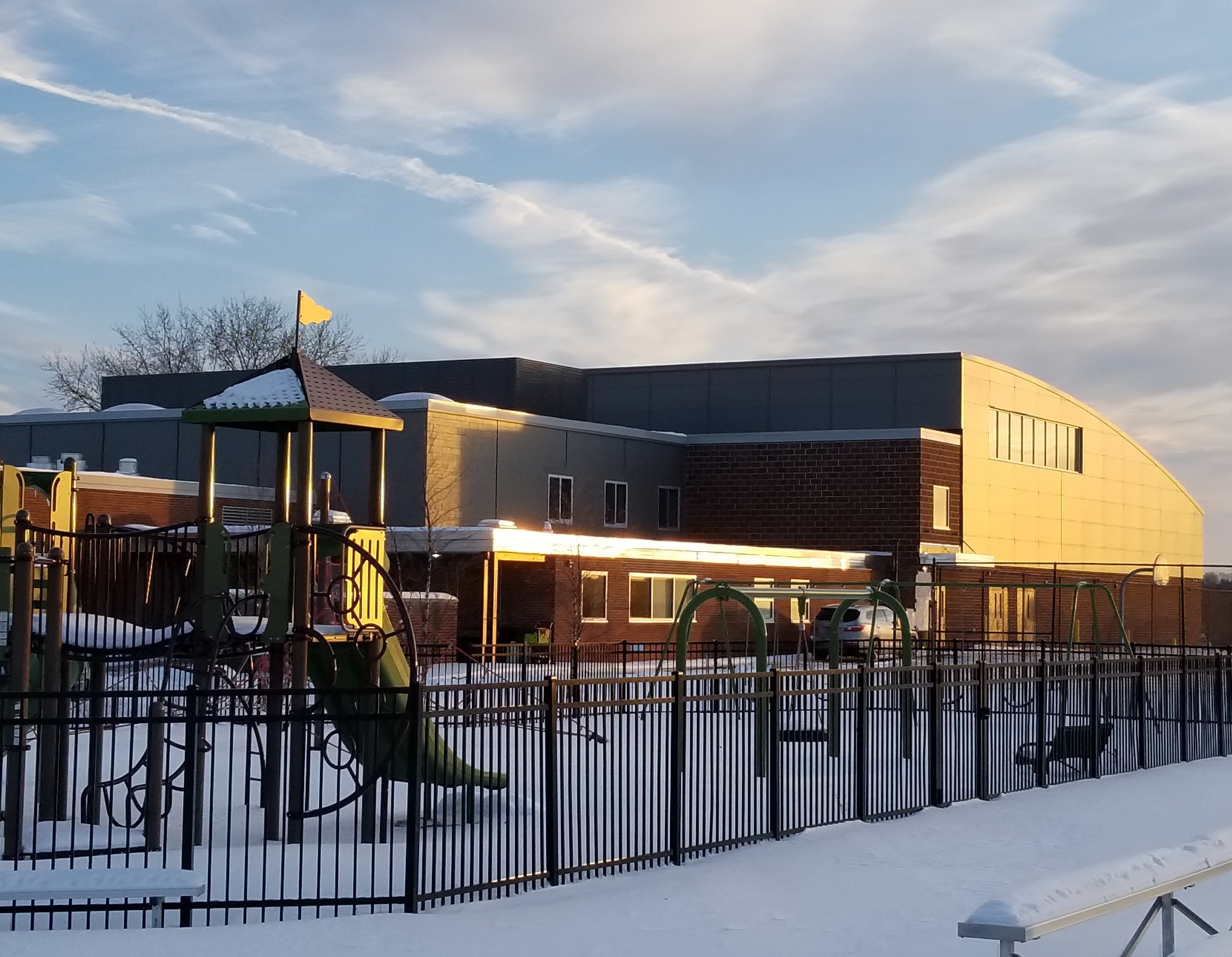
Gymnasium & Arts Building

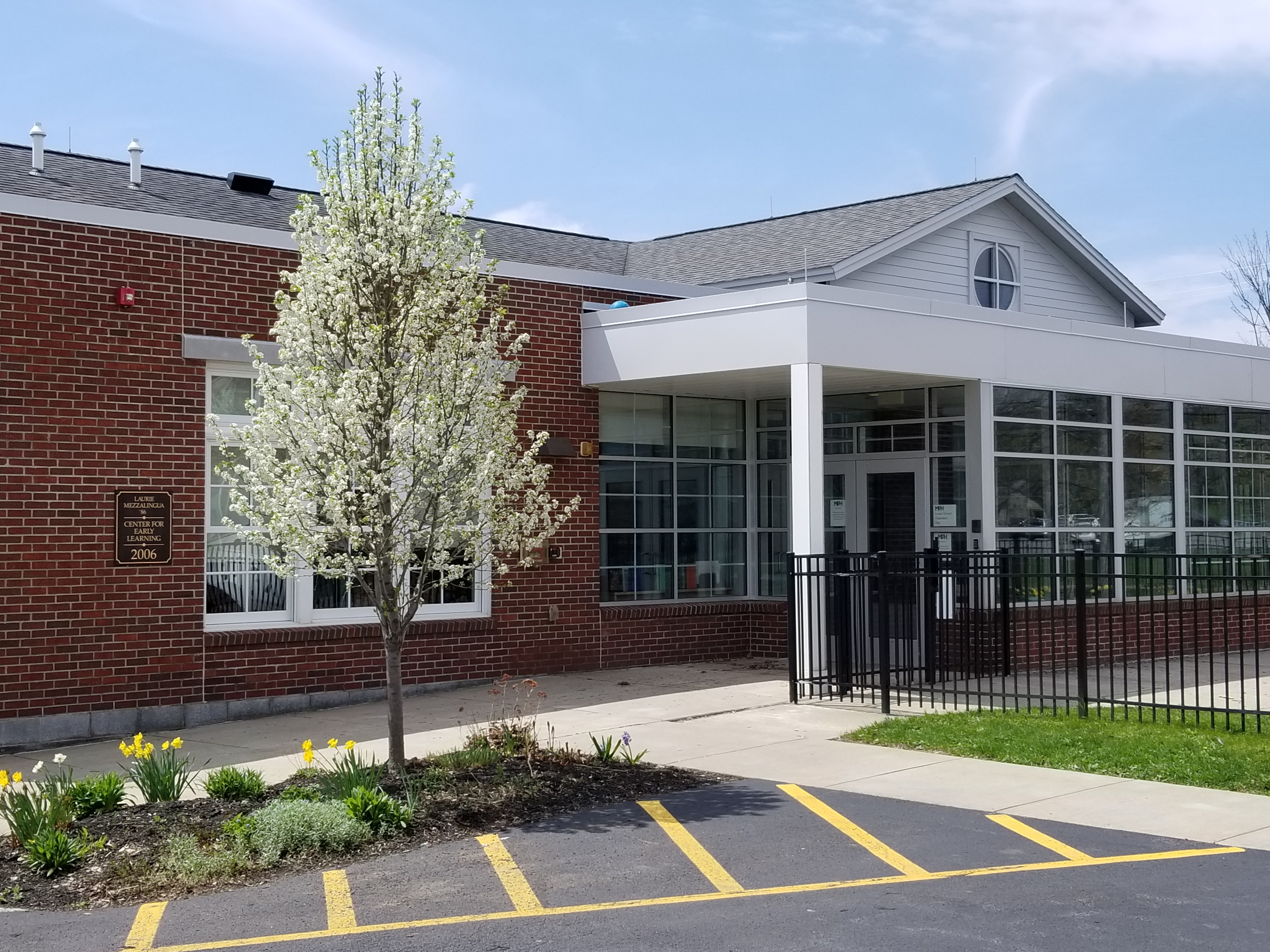
Center for Early Learning

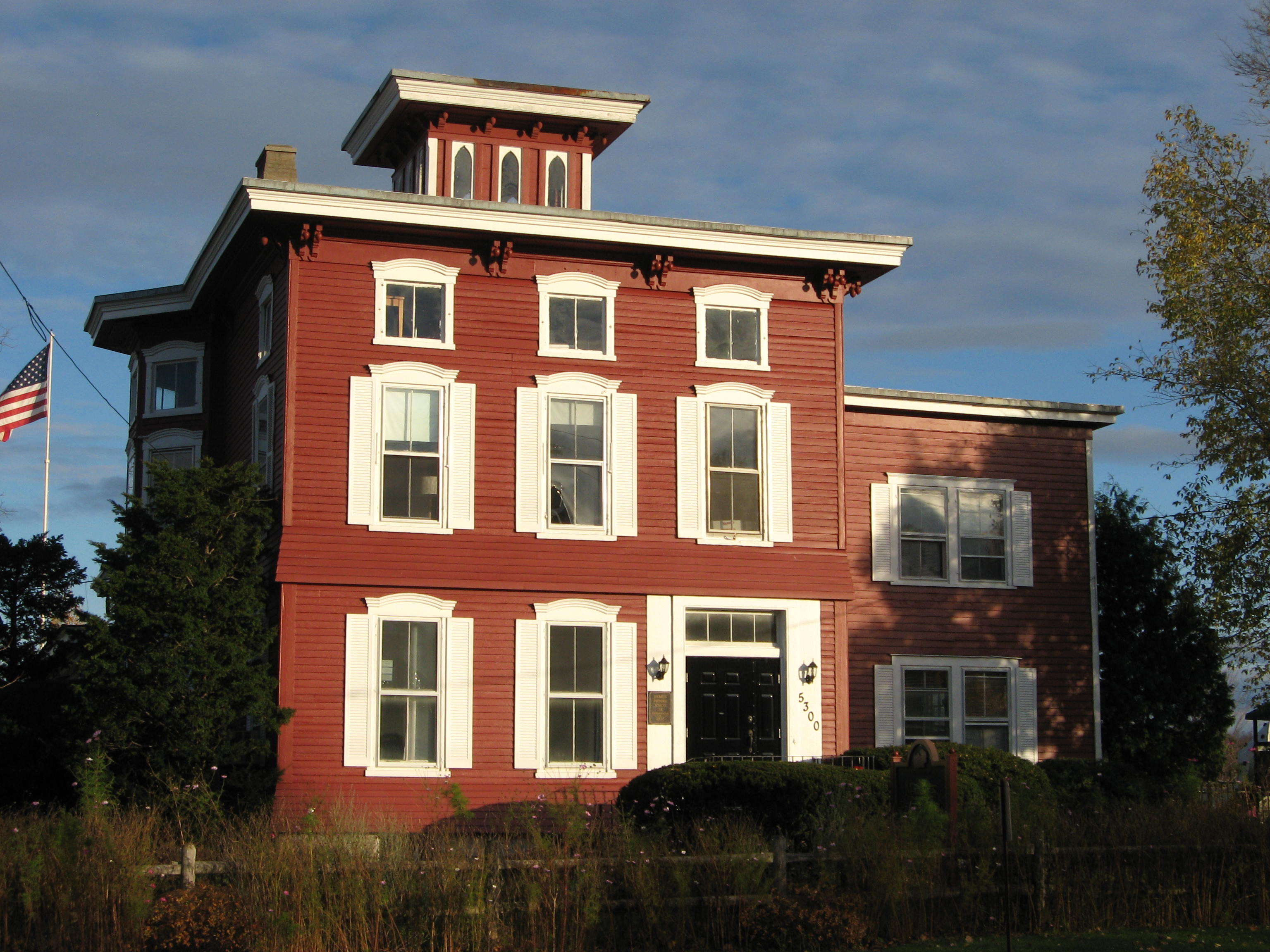
Farmhouse (front)

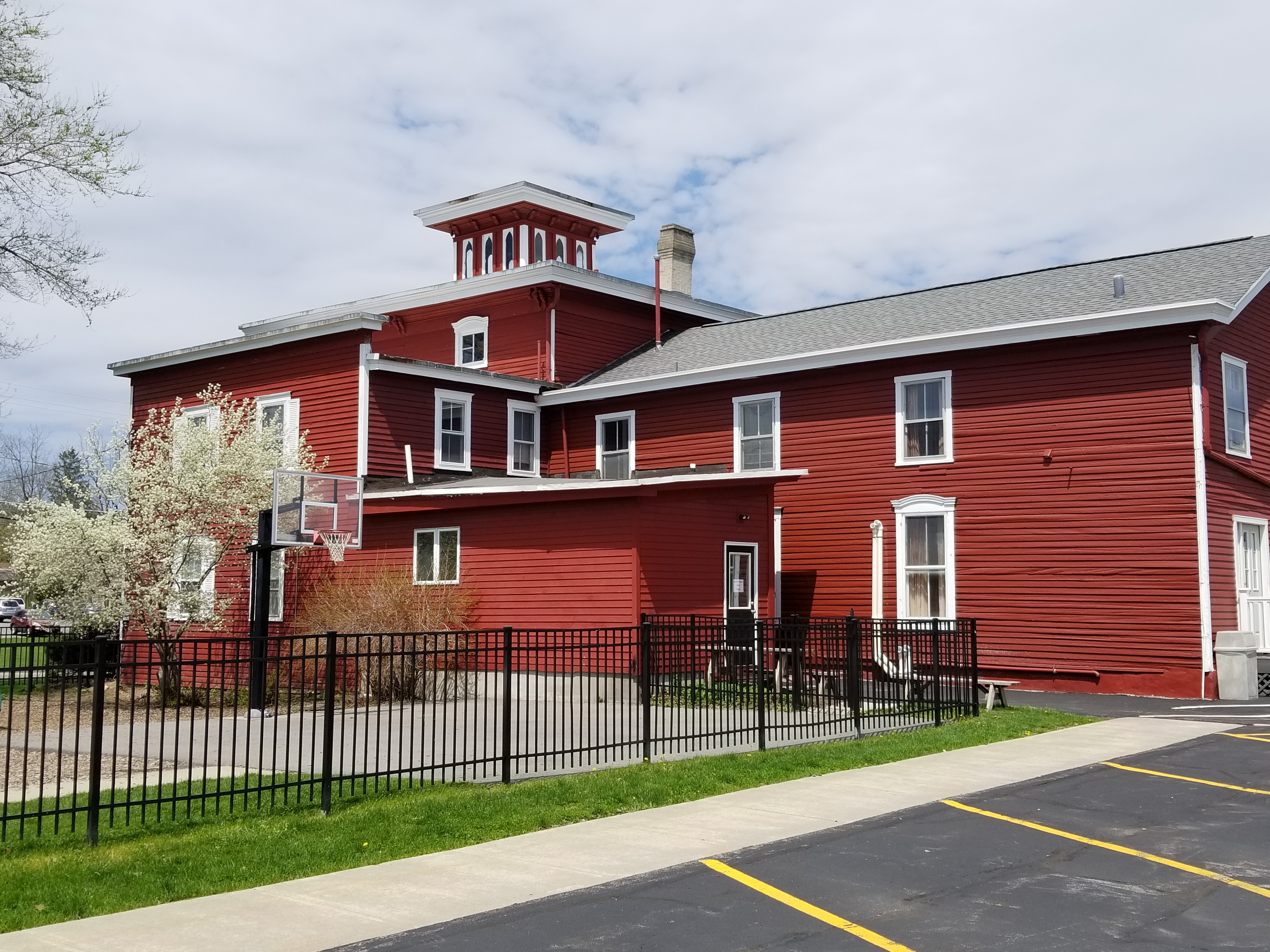
Farmhouse (rear view)

== Notable people ==
=== Heads of school ===
- Bishop Frederic D. Huntington, founder and president, St. John's Academy (1869–1904)
- William Verbeck, Adjutant General of New York State, head of school, The Manlius School (1877–1930)
- Col. Guido F. Verbeck head of school 1930–1940, The Manlius School
- General Singleton 1940–?
- MaCarthy..
- Charles W. Bradlee, head of school, Pebble Hill School (1932–1952)
- Maj. Gen. Ray Barker, head of school, The Manlius School (1946–1960)
- John G. Hodgdon, Headmaster, Pebble Hill School (1953–1962)
- James K. Wilson Jr., Superintendent, The Manlius School (1960–1969)
- Hugh J. Irish, President, The Manlius School (1970)
- Richard Barter, Headmaster, Manlius Pebble Hill School (1971–1972)
- Leibert Sedgwick, Headmaster, Manlius Pebble Hill School (1973–1975)
- James E. Crosby Jr., Headmaster, Manlius Pebble Hill School (1976–1978)
- Raymond Nelson, Headmaster, Manlius Pebble Hill School (1979–1981)
- James W. Songster, Headmaster, Manlius Pebble Hill School (1982–1990)
- Baxter F. Ball Jr., head of school, Manlius Pebble Hill School (1990–2011)
- D. Scott Wiggins, head of school, Manlius Pebble Hill School (2012-2015)
- James Dunaway, head of school, Manlius Pebble Hill School (2015–June 30, 2019)
- David J. McCusker Jr., head of school, Manlius Pebble Hill School (July 1, 2019 – 2023)
- James P. Foley, head of school, Manlius Pebble Hill School (2023–present)

=== Alumni ===
- Steve Wynn, founder of Wynn Resorts
- Peter Anderson, ceramist and founder of Shearwater Pottery
- Walter Inglis Anderson, painter, writer and naturalist
- Chief Buffalo Child Long Lance, pseudonym of Sylvester Clark Long, a triracial journalist, writer, actor; spokesman for Native American causes
- Chick Chandler, actor
- Mac Cummings, entrepreneur
- Howell M. Estes III (General, USAF, Ret.), former Commander in Chief, NORAD and US Space Command, and commander, Air Force Space Command
- Carl Gersbach, professional football player
- Elliot Griffis, composer
- Victor A. ("Vic") Hanson (1923), only inducted member of both the Neimsmith Memorial Basketball Hall of Fame and the College Football HOF
- James Caleb Jackson, nutritionist
- Thomas J. McIntyre (1929), Democratic U.S senator from New Hampshire
- Syd Silverman, owner and publisher of Variety
- Malcolm Wheeler-Nicholson, writer and publisher
- Hon. Kenneth R. Willard, New York State legislator
- William Chauncy Langdon (1871–1947), author, historian, and producer of historical theatrical pageants
