= Shearwater Cottage Murals =

Murals by Walter Anderson in Ocean Springs, Mississippi

Walter Anderson’s Shearwater Cottage Murals are painted on the wooden walls of Anderson’s cottage in Ocean Springs, Mississippi. Anderson painted these floor-to-ceiling murals to illustrate a Gulf Coast day, using bright colors and vibrant images to show the transition from day to night. The murals are also referred to as “Little Room” and “Creation at Sunrise.”

Walter Anderson probably began the murals in his cottage sometime after 1951. During his life, he never allowed anyone but himself, some cats, and the occasional possum to enter the room. However, after his death in 1965, Walter’s wife opened the door to the Little Room and found the spectacular mural.

In 1991, the murals were moved from Anderson’s cottage and are now housed in the Walter Anderson Museum of Art (Ocean Springs, Mississippi).

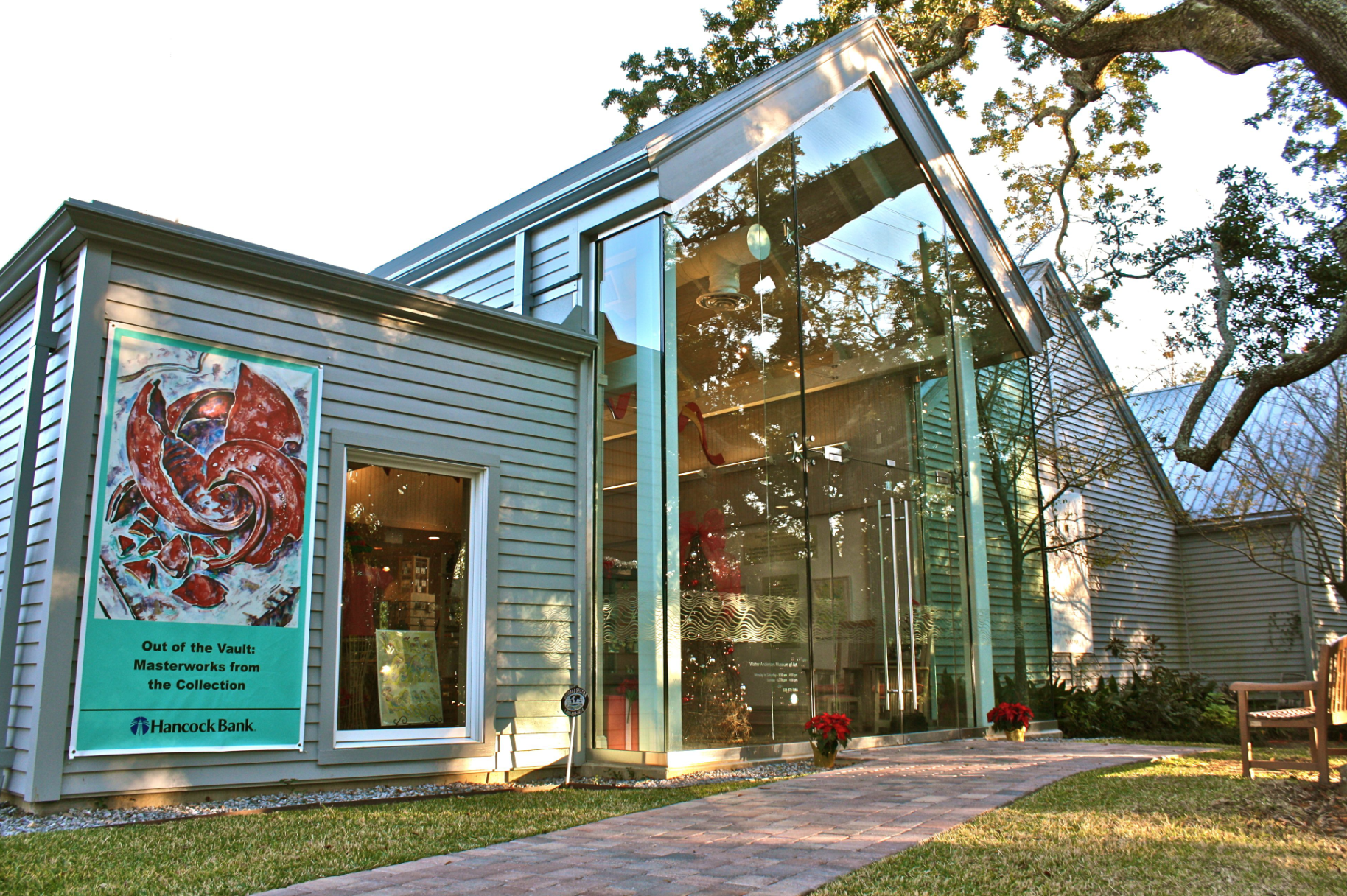
Walter Anderson Museum of Art

== Materials and composition ==
In 1939, Anderson built an extension on the south side of his home and the murals would eventually be painted in this extension. The room had a double window facing south and single windows on the east and west walls. The north wall was dominated by the back of the fireplace and chimney and had a door that led into the main cottage.

Walter Anderson used oil paints leftover from the murals he painted at the Community Center, along with house paint, tempura, and anything else that was handy.

Each wall of the cottage represents a different time of day:

- The East Wall: Sunrise
- The South Wall: Noon
- The West Wall: Sunset
- The North Wall: Night
- The Ceiling: Zinnia

== Symbolism ==
To mentally transport himself to Horn Island, Walter Anderson painted these murals to portray life and time on the island. These floor-to-ceiling murals beautifully chronicle the transition from night to day.

A wooden chest found in the cottage contained Anderson’s transcription of Psalm 104. The murals are thought to be inspired by Psalm 104. These murals can be seen as a gleaming hymn to the light and beauty of a day on the Coast.

Below is an excerpt from Psalm 104: Psalm 104: 1-3 KJV

1. Bless the Lord, O my soul. O Lord my God, thou art very great; thou art clothed with honour and majesty.
2. Who coverest thyself with light as with a garment: who stretchest out the heavens like a curtain:
3. Who layeth the beams of his chambers in the waters: who maketh the clouds his chariot: who walketh upon the wings of the wind.

== The east wall: sunrise ==
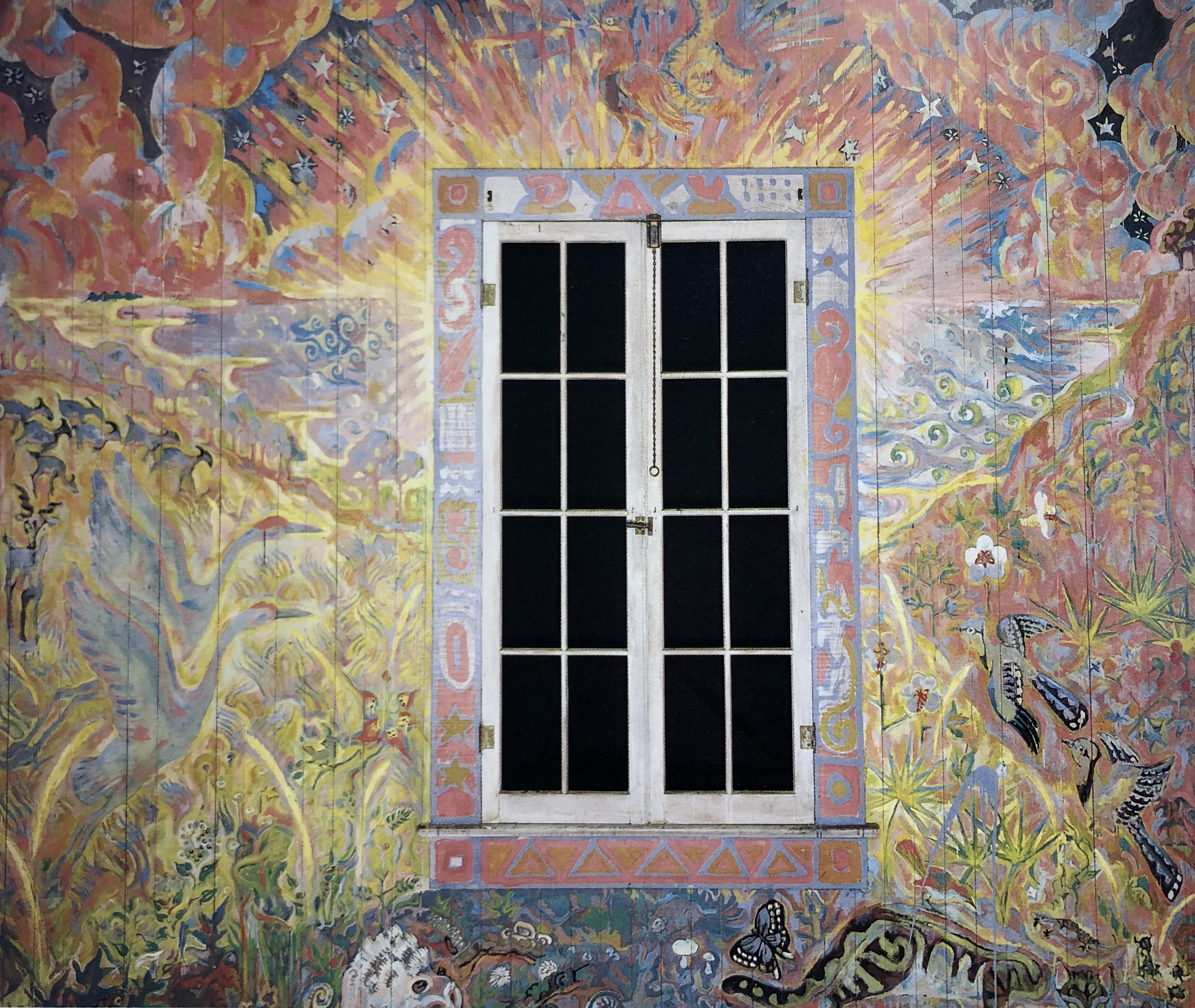
East Wall- Sunrise

The sun rises through the east window. The dominant feature is not anything in the mural, but the window around which the mural is composed. A crowing rooster is perched atop the window frame; to the left of the east window, we see a hillside with goats; and below the window is a stalking cat. Many elements on this wall allude to Psalm 104 such as verse 18 which says, “The high hills are a refuge for the wild goats…" The cat present on the mural may be an allusion to the young lions mentioned in Psalm 104 that are called from their night hunting by the rising sun.

== The south wall: noon ==
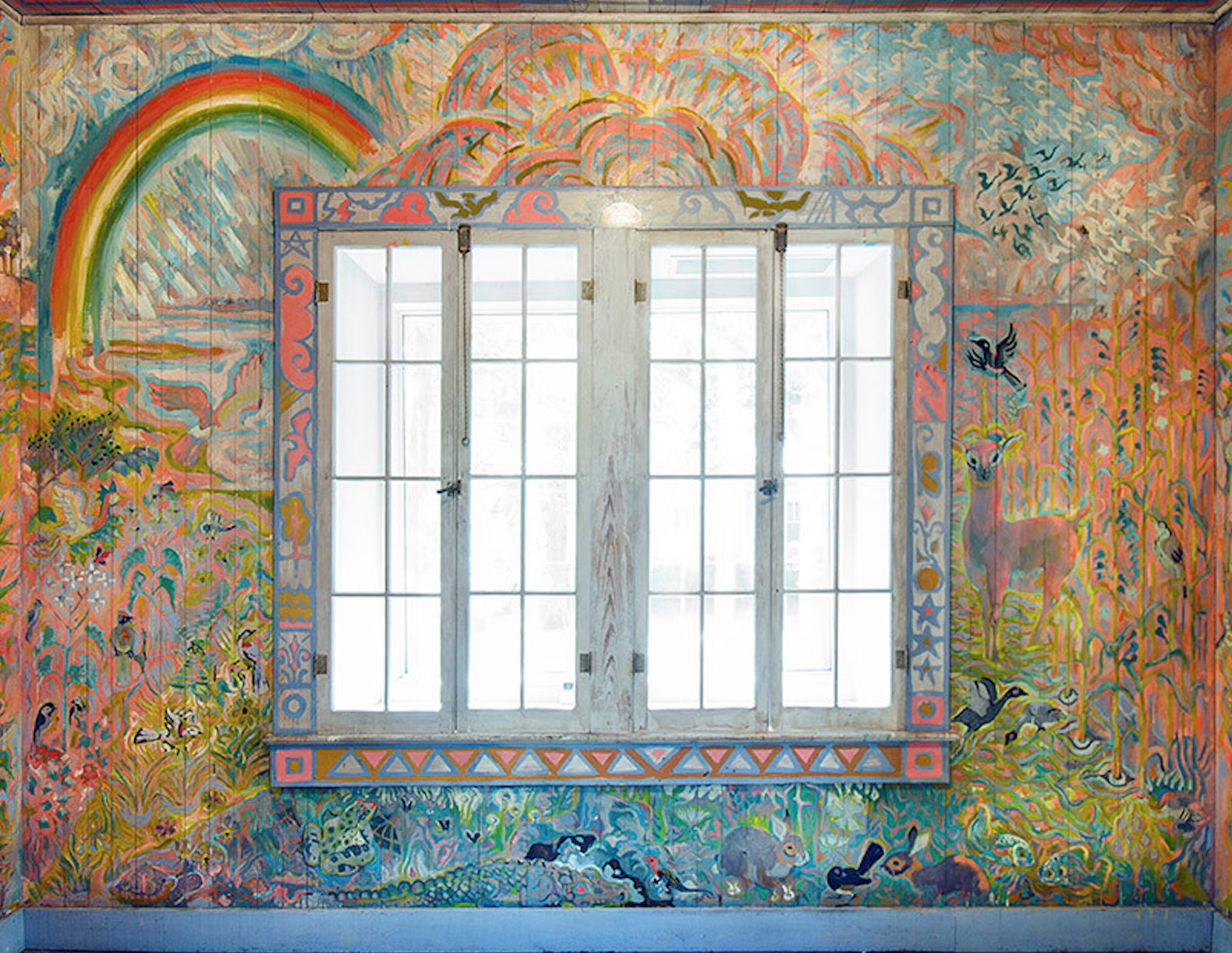
South Wall- Noon

A rainbow stretches across the wall, framing a passing storm. The midday light streams into the room through double casement windows. Around the windows, this wall is full of images of Gulf Coast animals. Moving along the wall, there is a doe drinking from a shallow stream. Psalm 104:10-11 offers a parallel: “He sendeth the springs into the valleys, which run among the hills. They give drink to every beast of the field: the wild asses quench their thirst.”

== The west wall: sunset ==
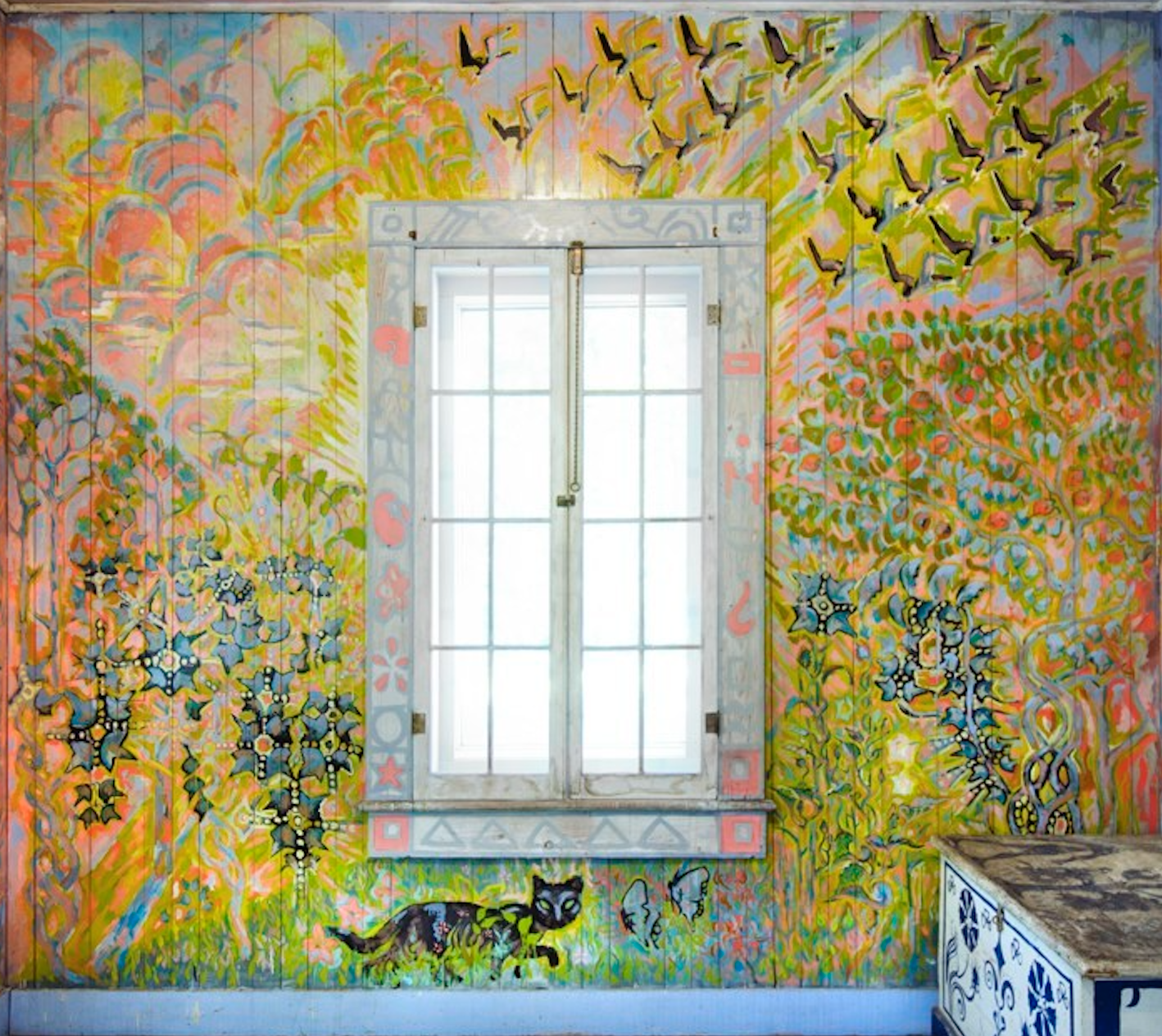
The West Wall- Sunset

The mural frames a window which allows the sun’s last rays to shine in and warm the cottage room. Beneath the window, a black cat stalks through grasses and flowers and looks directly across the room at a cat under the window on the east wall. The mural here represents, more particularly than the other sections, the scene outside the cottage, looking toward the municipal harbor. Pouring into the sun is a flock of black skimmers which flew over the harbor at this time of day. Again Psalm 104:20 is seen on this wall— “Thou makest darkness, and it is night: wherein all the beasts of the forest do creep forth.”

== The north wall: night ==
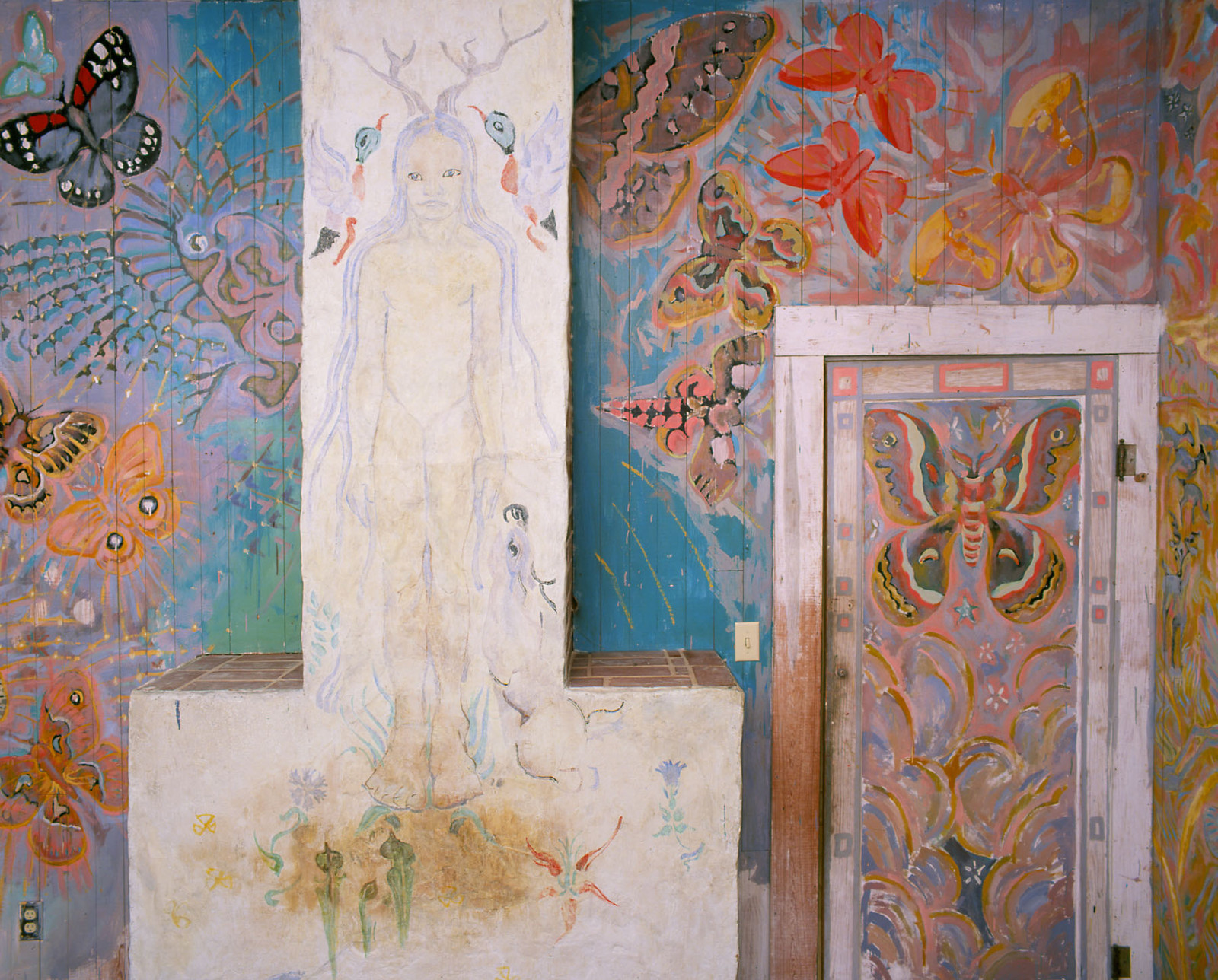
The North Wall- Night

The north wall differs dramatically from the other three. Instead of having windows, this wall is dominated by the back of the cottage’s chimneypiece and the door that leads into the cottage. The mural is thought to represent the night air, made luminous by a host of enormous moths. On the white plaster of the chimney, Anderson introduced a human element, in mythical female form, to the world of nature. The mythic fireplace figure shares this crown of tributaries and its identification with the Mississippi River confirms the orientation of the entire room. Anderson’s inclusion of this human form alludes to Psalm 104 in the sense that God accommodates man along with the other creatures. Psalm 104:14-15 states “ He causeth the grass to grow for the cattle, and herb for the service of man…And wine that maketh glad the heart of man, and oil to make his face to shine, and bread which strengtheneth man's heart.”

The ceiling: zinnia

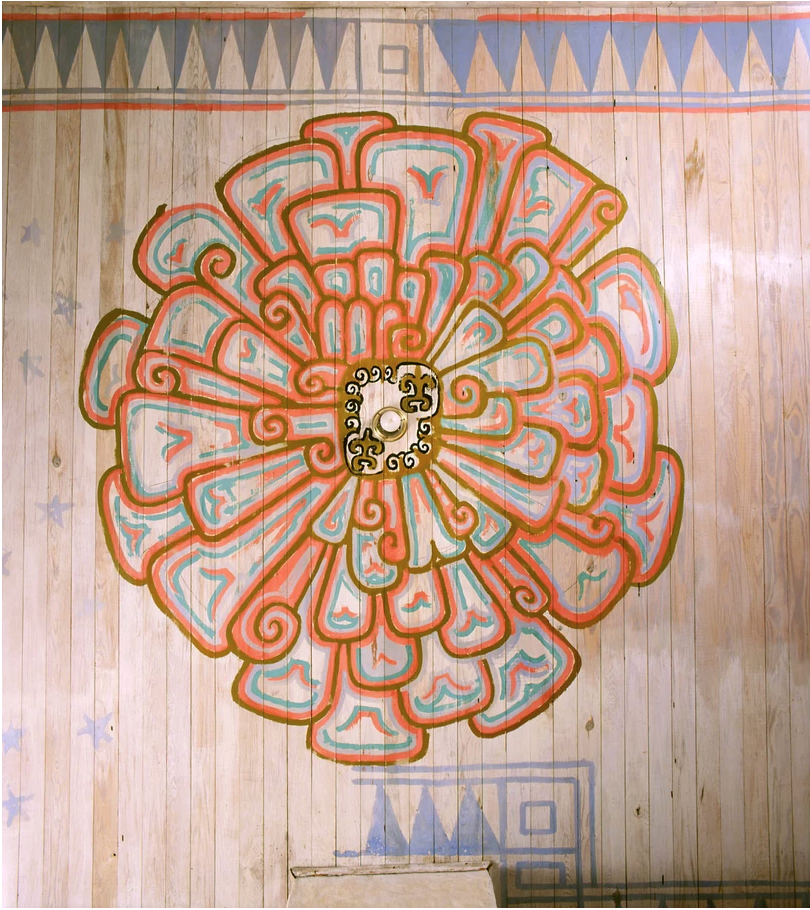
The Ceiling- Zinnia

On the ceiling, Anderson painted a monumental zinnia. The flower is centered upon the source of light and the painter has used light as the organizing principle of his mural in a way which illustrates the celebratory theme of Psalm 104.

== Restoration and conservation ==
In 1991, the murals were moved to the nearby Walter Anderson Museum of Art. Their orientation and interior setting remain the same and native plantings outside the museum will someday emulate the views from the cottage windows.

The murals should be approached as an element of their setting, the Mississippi Gulf Coast, which is also their subject, and as the intensely private expression of an artist who did not allow them to be seen while he was alive and was ambivalent about their preservation.

For full appreciation, the viewer should bring with him an awareness of the environment in which the mural was created.

== See also ==
- Walter Inglis Anderson
