= Walter Anderson Museum of Art =

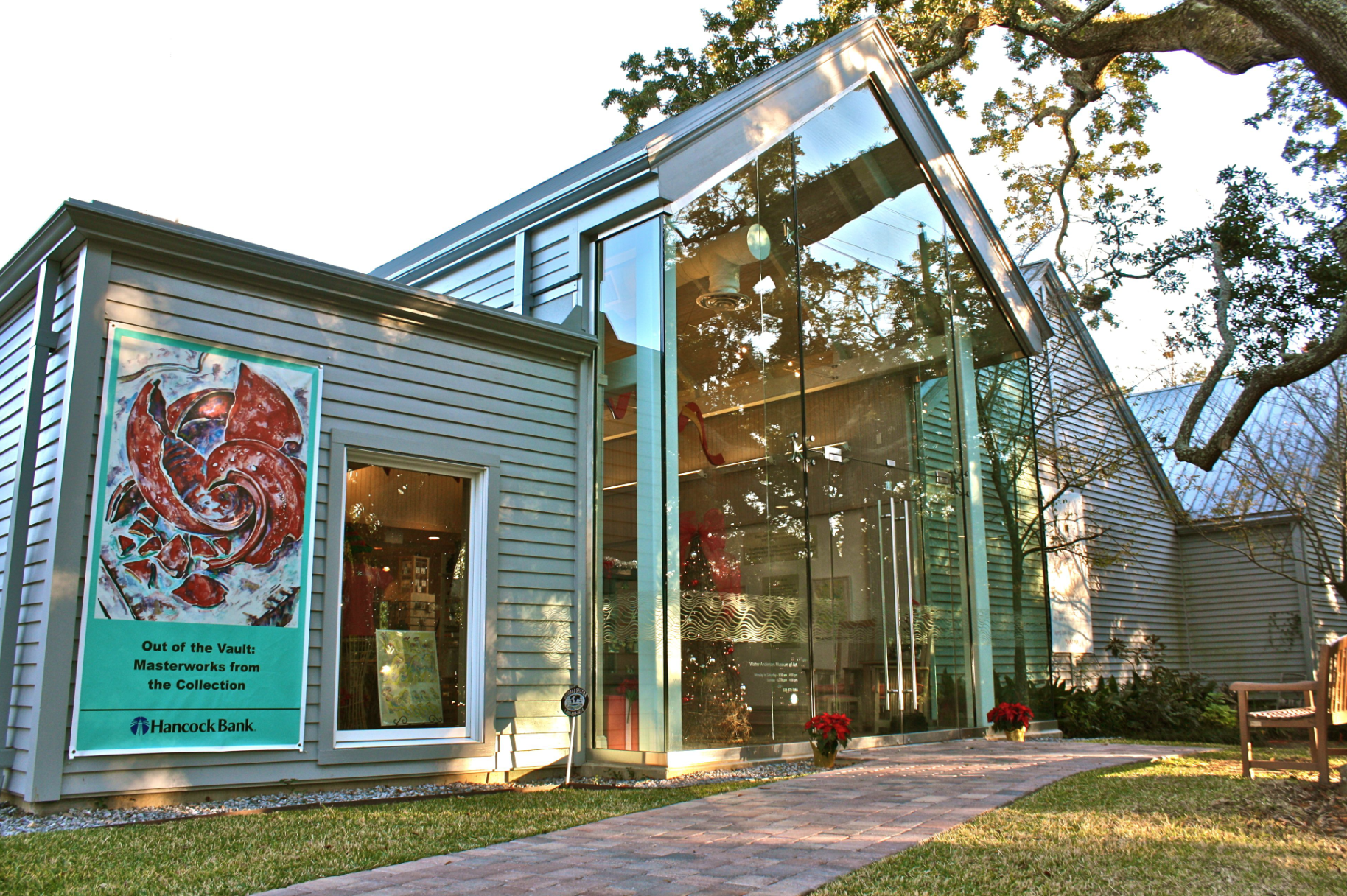
- Established: 1991
- Location: 510 Washington Avenue; Ocean Springs, Mississippi
- Coordinates: 30.4105°N 88.8275°W
- Type: Art museum
- Director: Maddie Codling
- Website: www.walterandersonmuseum.org

The Walter Anderson Museum of Art (WAMA) is located in Ocean Springs, Mississippi on the Mississippi Gulf Coast. WAMA is dedicated to the work of Walter Inglis Anderson (1903–1965), whose depictions of coastal plants, animals, landscapes, and people have placed him among the most singular artists of the 20th century; and to his brothers, Peter Anderson (1901–1984), potter and founder of Shearwater Pottery; and James McConnell Anderson (1907–1998), painter and ceramist. The mission of the museum is to “empower lifelong curiosity and connection to the natural world through the art of Walter Anderson and kindred artists.”

The Walter Anderson Museum of Art began as an idea by a group of people in Ocean Springs and Jackson, Mississippi to preserve the art and culture of Walter Inglis Anderson. The Friends of Walter Anderson was chartered in 1974, and through their efforts, funds and grant money were raised to build the museum on Washington Avenue in Ocean Springs on land leased from Jackson County. Mark A Tullos, Jr. was hired as the museum's first director in 1990. The museum was dedicated on May 4, 1991, at a cost estimated at $1.3 million. The conceptual architect of the project, Edward Pickard, former husband of Mary Anderson, the eldest child of Walter Anderson, designed the building to keep it in the style of the Shearwater compound. The museum connects Anderson's most public project – the 3,000 square-foot Ocean Springs Community Center murals, with his most private work – the Little Room murals, an immersive space discovered after his death in 1965 and installed at the museum.

Since 2016, Mississippi hill country blues artist Luther Dickinson has staged quasi-annual performances of music inspired by Anderson's Seven Climates of Ocean Springs murals at the Ocean Springs Community Center, now part of the museum. Writer Jim Beaugez, an Ocean Springs native, has documented some of Dickinson's performances for magazines such as Garden & Gun and Guitar Player.

== See also ==
- List of single-artist museums
