= Vestige (restaurant) =

Restaurant in Ocean Springs, Mississippi, U.S.

- Interactive map of Vestige

Restaurant information
- Location: 715 Washington Avenue, Ocean Springs, Mississippi, 39564, United States
- Coordinates: 30°24′48″N 88°49′41″W

Vestige is a restaurant in Ocean Springs, Mississippi. It was a semifinalist in the Outstanding Restaurant category of the James Beard Foundation Awards in 2024.
