= Biloxi Bay Bridge =

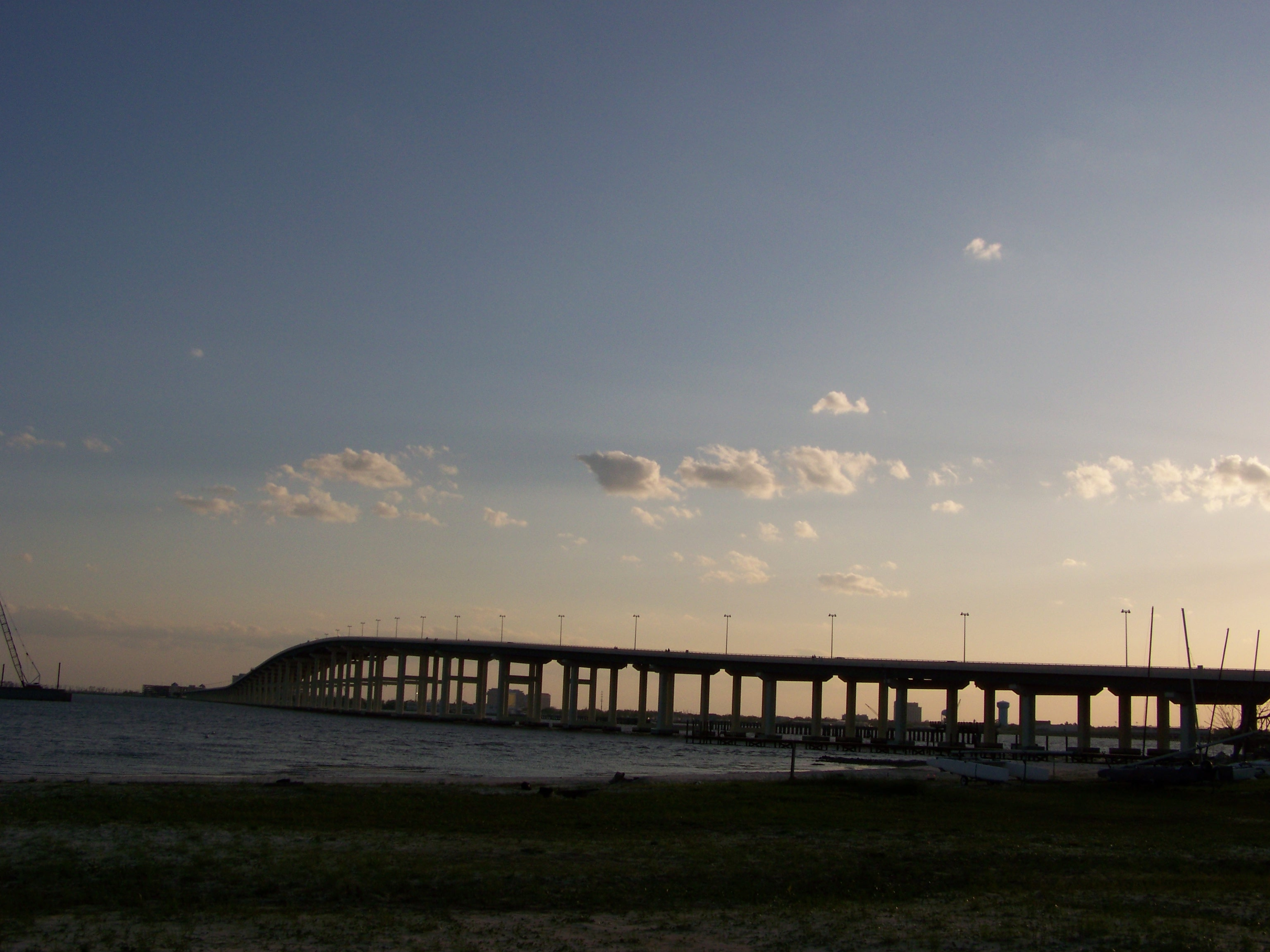
- Biloxi Bay Bridge from the shore.
- Coordinates: 30°24′6″N 88°50′58″W
- Carries: 6 lanes of US 90
- Crosses: Biloxi Bay
- Locale: Biloxi and Ocean Springs, Mississippi
- Maintained by: MDOT

Characteristics
- Width: 129 ft (39.3 m)
- Height: 95 ft (28.9 m)

History
- Opened: November 1, 2007

Location
- Interactive map of Biloxi Bay Bridge

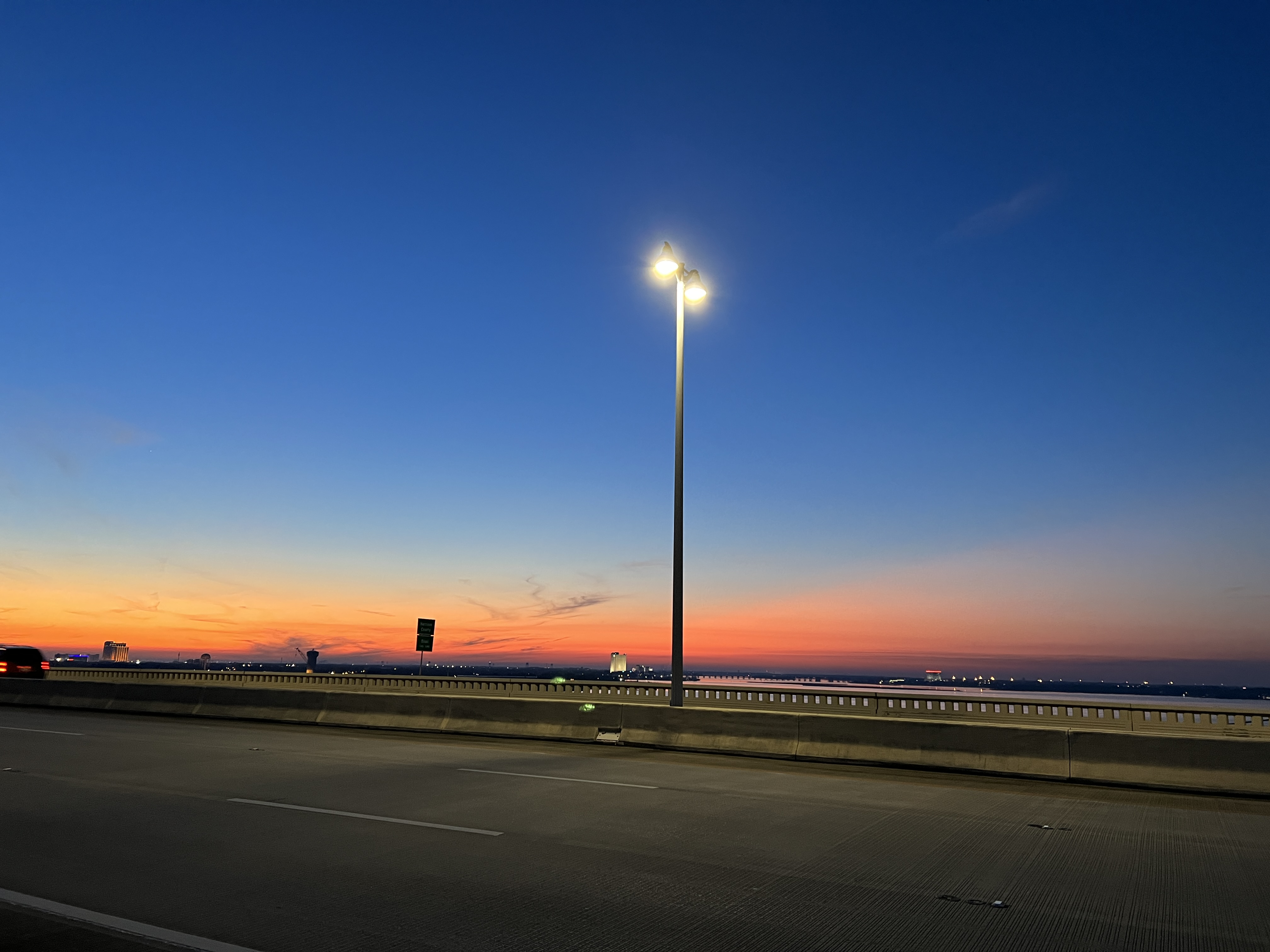
Sunset at the Biloxi Bay Bridge

The Biloxi Bay Bridge is a bridge in the U.S. state of Mississippi which carries U.S. Route 90 (US 90) over Biloxi Bay between Biloxi and Ocean Springs. Though the bridge's ballast and accompanying railroad track was heavily damaged by Hurricane Katrina in August 2005, the structure remained and subsequently underwent major repairs. It reopened to traffic on November 1, 2007. The span carries 6 lanes of traffic as well as a 12-foot (3.7 m) path for pedestrians and bicyclists on the Gulf side of the bridge.

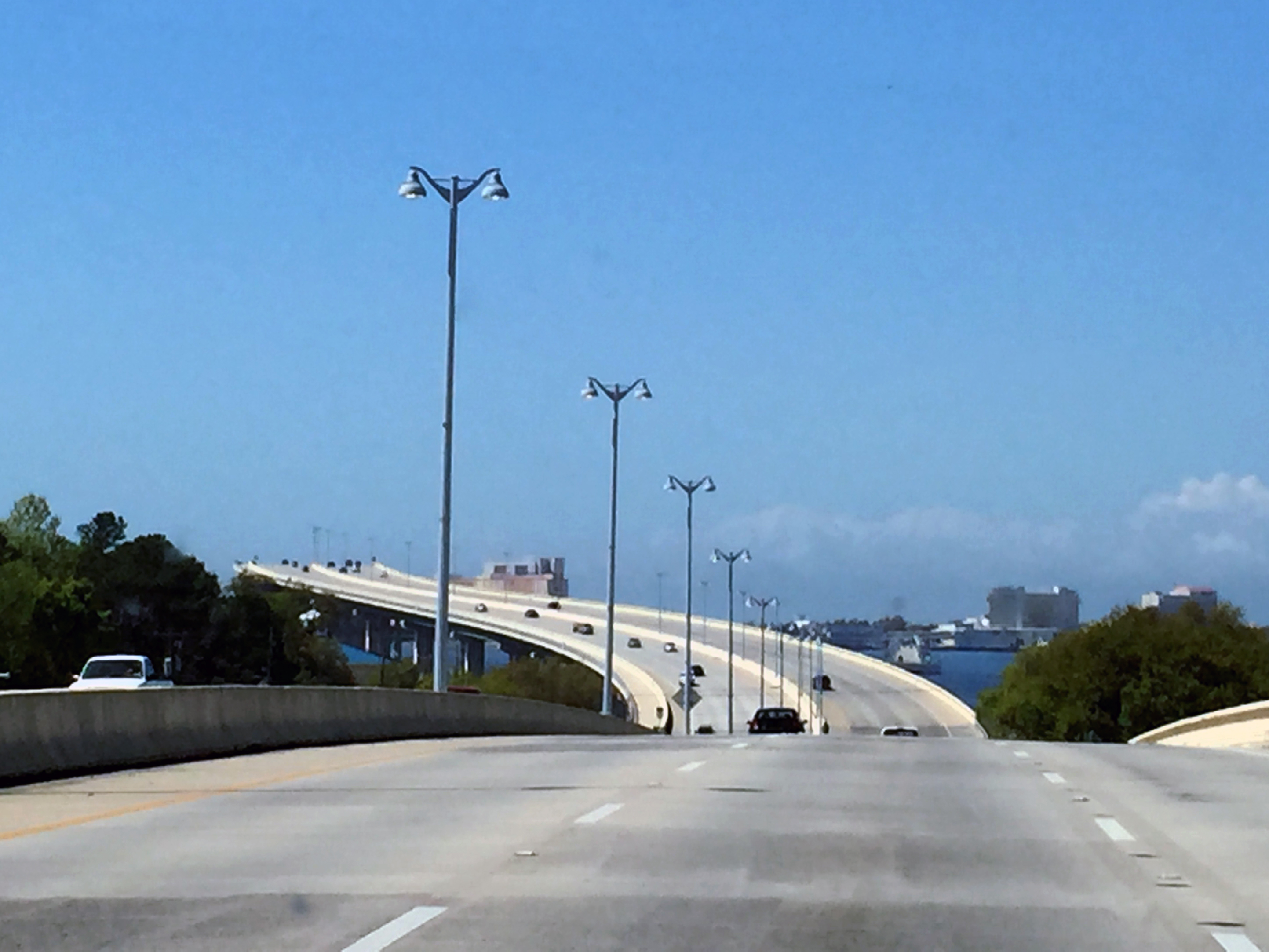
Eastbound approach to the Biloxi Bay Bridge

== Reconstruction after Hurricane Katrina ==
After the bridge's destruction from Hurricane Katrina in 2005, the MDOT tasked the reconstruction of the bridge to GC Constructors and its subcontractor Parsons for $339 million. Terms of the contract included that the bridge must have one lane of traffic in each direction open within 18 months, and all construction completed within 22 months. Construction was completed ahead of schedule, at 20 months. The new bridge is 129 feet wide, with three lanes of traffic in each direction, as well as a 12 ft pedestrian & cyclist path on the south facing side of the bridge. The new bridge is designed to withstand hurricane-force winds and waves similar to those of Katrina.
