= Alvin Endt =

American politician (1933–2016)

Member of the Mississippi House of Representatives from the 113th district
- In office 1984–1999

Personal details
- Born: September 28, 1933 Ocean Springs, Mississippi, U.S.
- Died: June 20, 2016 (aged 82) Ocean Springs, Mississippi, U.S.
- Party: Republican
- Other political affiliations: Democratic (until 1990)
- Spouse: Bettie Boyd
- Children: 4
- Parent(s): Albert Endt; Maude Crysell Endt
- Education: University of Southern Mississippi
- Profession: Politician, educator

Alvin Endt (September 28, 1933 – June 20, 2016) was an American politician and educator who served in the Mississippi House of Representatives from 1984 to 1999, representing the 113th legislative district of Mississippi as both a Democrat and Republican.

== Early life and education ==
Endt was born in Ocean Springs, Mississippi, on September 28, 1933, to Albert Endt and Maude Crysell Endt. He graduated from the University of Southern Mississippi.

== Career ==
Endt served in the Mississippi House of Representatives, representing the 113th legislative district of Mississippi from 1984 to 1999. Although he initially served as a Democrat, in 1990, Endt, along with three other Mississippi state legislators, left the party and became a Republican.

According to Endt, he had been considering switching parties for about a year, stating, "I'm not leaving the Democrats – they left me long ago. My thoughts are conservative, and being associated with the Republican Party is being associated with the more conservative political party."

Outside of the Mississippi Legislature, Endt was a history teacher at St. Martin High School. He also served two terms as an alderman of Ocean Springs from 1965 to 1973 and was appointed Jackson County Supervisor in 1982.

== Personal life ==
Endt was married to Bettie Boyd, with whom he had four children.

Endt died at the age of 82 at his home in Ocean Springs, Mississippi, on June 20, 2016.

Mississippi House of Representatives
Preceded by —	Member of the Mississippi House of Representatives from the 113th district 1984–1999	Succeeded by —
