= James McConnell Anderson =

American painter (1907–1998)

James McConnell "Mac" Anderson (August 9, 1907 in New Orleans – April 3, 1998 in Jackson County, Mississippi) was an American painter, muralist, and pottery designer and decorator, youngest of the three brothers (along with Walter Inglis Anderson and founder Peter Anderson) who collaborated at Shearwater Pottery, in Ocean Springs, Mississippi.

== Early life and education ==
A photo of James Anderson during his youth

Born in New Orleans, Anderson was the third and youngest son of Annette McConnell and George Walter Anderson. He attended military boarding school, (Isidore Newman School) and in Chattanooga (The McCallie School), graduating in 1926. He studied architecture at Tulane University with William Spratling from 1926 until 1928.

== Art and business career ==
Anderson's brother Peter opened the Shearwater Pottery Factory in Ocean Springs, Mississippi in 1928, on a 24-acre parcel of property his parents had purchased in 1918. In 1929 Anderson and his brother Walter built an extension adjacent to Peter's factory. The brothers began working at the Annex in 1930. Anderson made molds, fired the products, and supervised Shearwater's production.

In Shearwater's third year of existence (1931), he joined his brother Walter ("Bob") in a new business venture, "the Shearwater Annex", where, over the years, the two of them designed and produced inexpensive decorative objects ranging from sets of ceramic baseball and football players, to humorous figurines of Southern blacks and legendary pirates, to lamp bases, and smaller objects called "widgets", which "filled spaces in the kiln under the larger pieces to increase the value of the firing" (Lebow, "James McConnell Anderson"). Characteristic pieces included the baseball player series, woodpecker mugs, small fish and animals (Patti Carr Black, p. 200). The figurines, which appealed to Gulf Coast tourists, received national publicity in the early 1930s and helped Shearwater survive the Depression.

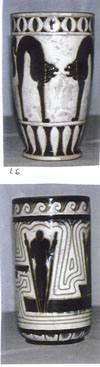
James McConnell Anderson, "Cat Vase", "Oyster Tongers"

== Adele Anderson Lawton ==
Years later, Adele Anderson Lawton worked as a decorator at Shearwater and as painter of the linoleum block prints cut by her uncle Walter Anderson (Carr, p. 201) as well as the silk screens made from those prints; assisted her father with the reproduction of his graphic works; and developed a family store in Ocean Springs "featuring fabrics, clothing and prints of Walter Anderson's designs".
