= Shearwater Pottery =

Mississippi Pottery

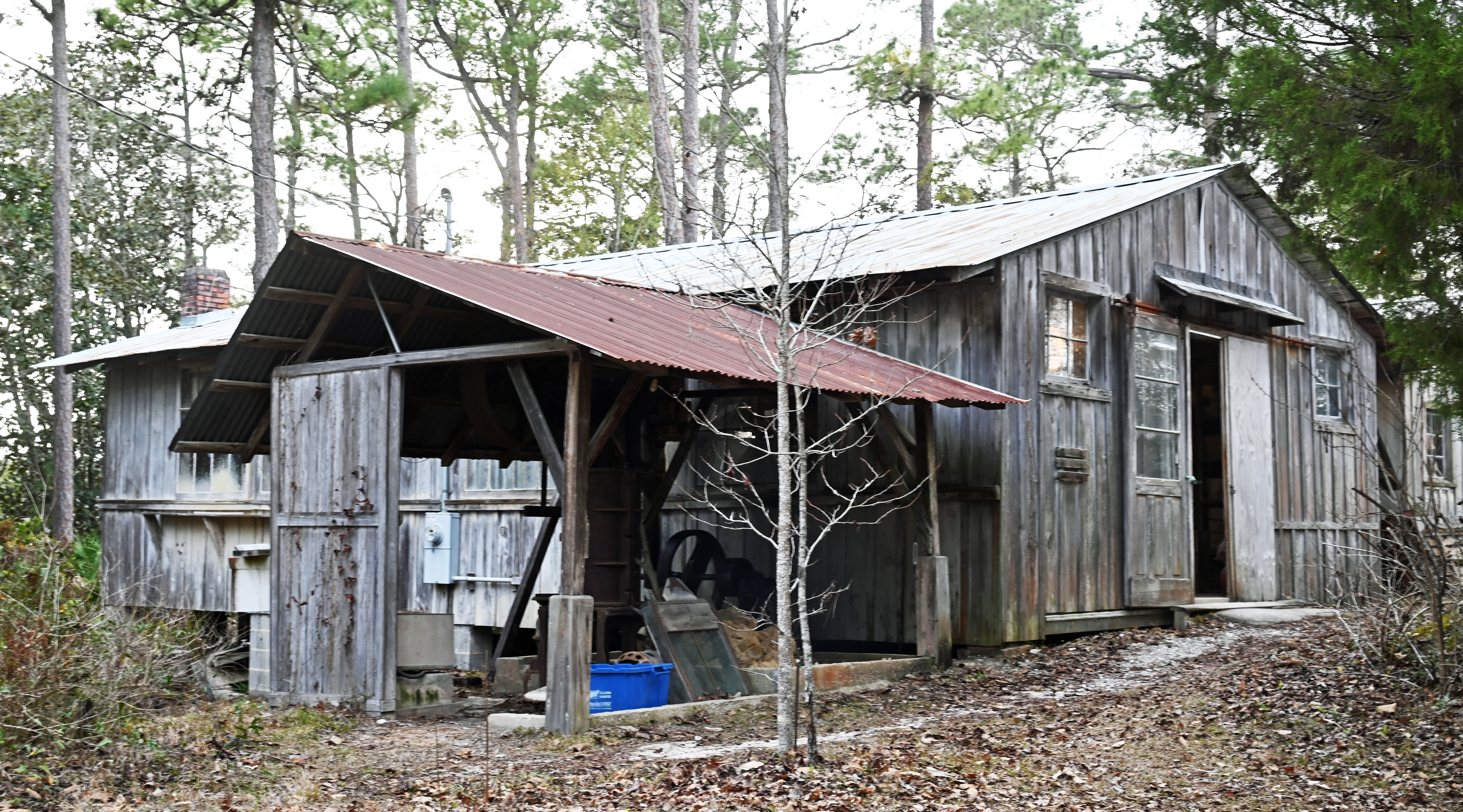
The workshop at Shearwater Pottery

Shearwater Pottery is a small family-owned pottery in Ocean Springs, Mississippi, United States founded in 1928 by Peter Anderson (1901-1984), with the support of his parents, George Walter Anderson and Annette McConnell Anderson. From the 1920s through the present day, the pottery has produced art pottery, utilitarian ware, figurines, decorative tiles and other ceramic objects. Two of its most important designers were Walter Inglis Anderson (1903-1965) and his brother James McConnell Anderson (1907-1998). Although Shearwater was severely damaged by Hurricane Katrina in 2005, the workshop was rebuilt and restored by Jason Stebly. Pottery continues to be thrown by Peter's son James Anderson and the latter's son Peter Wade Anderson, and decorated by Patricia Anderson Findeisen, Christopher Inglis Stebly, Adele Anderson Lawton and others. Michael Anderson heads the Shearwater Annex, and Marjorie Anderson Ashley is business manager.

== See also ==
- George E. Ohr, the "Mad Potter of Biloxi"
- Walter Anderson Museum of Art in Ocean Springs

== External sources ==
- Christopher Maurer, Dreaming in Clay on the Coast of Mississippi: Love and Art at Shearwater (Doubleday, 2001) Second edition, University Press of Mississippi, 2010.
- C. Maurer & M.E. Iglesias Research Collection on Walter Anderson and Shearwater Pottery at Special Collections, University of Mississippi
- Dod Stewart, Shearwater Pottery (privately printed, 2006)
- Shearwater Pottery
- Dreaming in Clay
- Art of James McConnell Anderson
- Ogden Museum of Southern Art exhibition notes on Walter Inglis Anderson
- Ocean Springs Archives by Ray L. Bellande
