= Walter Inglis Anderson =

American painter and writer (1903–1965)

- "Reflection in a Pool" by Walter Anderson
- Born: September 29, 1903; New Orleans, Louisiana, US
- Died: November 30, 1965 (aged 62); New Orleans, Louisiana, US
- Education: Pennsylvania Academy of the Fine Arts
- Known for: Painting

Walter Inglis Anderson (September 29, 1903 – November 30, 1965) was an American painter and writer.

Anderson died from cancer November 30, 1965, at the age of 62.

== Early life and education ==
Anderson was born in New Orleans to George Walter Anderson, a grain broker, and Annette McConnell Anderson, a prominent New Orleans family member who had studied art at Newcomb College. He was the second of three brothers, the eldest being Peter Anderson and the youngest James McConnell "Mac" Anderson.

As a child, Anderson attended St. John's School in Manilus, New York until his schooling was interrupted at age 14 by World War I. He then transferred to the Manual Training School in New Orleans, Louisiana.

In 1922 he enrolled at the New York School of Fine and Applied Art (now Parsons School of Design). After a year at Parsons, he won a scholarship to study at The Pennsylvania Academy of the Fine Arts. Here (1924–1928) he would study under iconoclastic modernists like Henry McCarter, Hugh Breckenridge, and Arthur Carles, winning a Packard Award for his animal drawing and a Cresson Traveling Scholarship, which allowed him to spend a summer in France. While in France, Anderson was particularly impressed with cave paintings, which noticeably influenced his drawing style.

== Ocean Springs ==
Anderson's older brother Peter opened the Shearwater Pottery Factory in Ocean Springs, Mississippi in 1928, on a 24-acre parcel of property his parents had purchased in 1918.

Anderson moved to Ocean Springs after his years at the Pennsylvania Academy of the Fine Arts and worked as a designer in the family business, Shearwater Pottery. In 1928-29 he designed his earliest ceramic pieces: pelican and crab bookends, lampstands, peculiar "Resting" and "Sitting Geometric Cat"; a "Horse and Rider" and innumerable plates and vases. His work as a designer and decorator at Shearwater Pottery from 1928 until his death, included incised pieces, sgraffito work, underglaze decoration, woodcarvings of saints, and designs for furniture.

Among his early projects, launched with his younger brother James ("Mac"), was a "Shearwater Pottery Annex" which produced inexpensive figurines, giving Anderson enough of an income in 1932 to marry Agnes Grinstead an art history graduate of Radcliffe College, who would later write a poignant memoir of their life together (Approaching the Magic Hour). During the early years, manufacturing of the figurines, which he called "widgets", prevented Anderson from painting and led to considerable tension.

In 1934, commissioned by a family friend, Ellsworth Woodward, Anderson painted an ambitious mural in the auditorium of the Ocean Springs Public School ("Ocean Springs Past and Present") as part of Public Works of Art Project. Paintings from this period include: "Indians Hunting"; "Jockeys Riding Horses"; four oil portraits of Sissy, 1933–37; "Black Skimmer"; "Androcles and Lion"; "Man on Horse"; and Birth of Achilles (Memphis Brooks Museum of Art); along with watercolors of flowers, animals, and birds; studies for a projected book on birds of the southeastern U.S.; and linoleum blockprints, including "Tourist Cards;" "Alphabet"; nursery rhymes; "On the River"; "Valkyries"; "Butterfly Book"; and scenes from Shearwater Pottery. Designs for a second mural, in the Jackson, Mississippi, Court House, were accepted by an illustrious committee then rejected by a Washington bureaucrat, causing Anderson considerable frustration. This disappointment, coupled with the death of his father in 1937, lingering bouts of both malaria and undulant fever, and the struggle to eke out a living with work he detested (manufacturing figurines) led to a mental breakdown, with psychotic episodes, in 1937 and treatment in the Henry Phipps Psychiatric Hospital and, in later years, the Sheppard and Enoch Pratt Hospital and the Mississippi State Hospital where he was diagnosed with schizophrenia.

== Oldfields ==
In 1941, Anderson moved to Gautier, Mississippi, to live on his wife's father's estate (Oldfields) with his family. An extraordinarily productive period followed. Freed from his work at the Pottery, he had time to draw, paint and make block prints; to illustrate some of his favorite books; to experiment with theories of dynamic symmetry and with the drawing methods of the Mexican artist and educator Adolfo Best Maugard; and to translate from Spanish part of Jose Pijoan's history of art (probably without realizing that the work had already been translated into English).

== Horn Island ==
The Oldfields period came to an end in 1945 when he left his family and moved back to a cottage at Shearwater. From then until his death in 1965 he lived a reclusive life, working as a decorator at the Pottery and making frequent excursions in a rowboat sometimes rigged with a sail, from Ocean Springs to Horn Island, Mississippi, where he lived in primitive conditions and portrayed the life around him - birds, sea creatures, animals, trees, landscapes - in radiant watercolors and in a series of logbooks. He also ventured abroad to Costa Rica and China, and made numerous bicycle trips, on some of which he traveled for thousands of miles. "The wheels are turning again", he once wrote. "A bicycle seems to leave no room for other evils, or goods for that matter. It is an inclusive and exclusive wheel."

One of his greatest works from this period is a series of murals in the Ocean Springs Community House. Along one wall, he painted the landing in Ocean Springs of the 17th-century French explorer Pierre Le Moyne d'Iberville. Along the opposite wall he painted what he called the "Seven Climates", in the sense of "a belt of the earth's surface contained between two given parallels of latitude." The Gulf Coast - Ocean Springs in particular - is seen as a microcosm of these climates, each of which Anderson associates with a corresponding celestial body and with a season of the year: Jupiter, Saturn, Mars, the Sun, Venus, Mercury and the Moon, beginning with Mercury and ending with Uranus. Anderson must also have been aware of the doctrine that the seven planetary spheres, with their different tones, produce a celestial music. Around the same time, Anderson painted murals along the wooden walls of a padlocked room in his cottage at Shearwater. These murals, now called the Shearwater Cottage Murals, were discovered after his death and are inspired by Psalm 104. They are a radiant hymn to light and to the beauty of one day on the Coast, beginning on the east wall with sunrise and continuing around the room through noon, sunset and night. Both murals may be seen at the Walter Anderson Museum of Art.

When the Brooklyn Museum invited him to an exhibition of his linoleum block prints in 1948, he chose instead to travel to China, where he hoped to gaze upon unknown landscapes and examine Tibetan murals (the China trip ended, deep inland, when his passport and other belongings were stolen and Anderson returned, partly on foot, to his point of departure in Hong Kong.)

== Walter Anderson as a writer ==
Among Anderson's most vivid writings are logbooks recording his travels by bicycle to New York City (1942); New Orleans (1943); Texas (1945); China (1949); Costa Rica (1951); and Florida (1960); an account of his life among the pelican colonies of North Key, in the Chandeleurs; and about 90 journals of his trips to Horn Island, off the Gulf Coast of Mississippi, in which he combines close observation of the natural world with reflection on art and nature. Another noteworthy log describes a walking tour to a colony of sand- hill cranes north of Gautier, Mississippi, in January 1944.

== After Hurricane Katrina ==
Anderson's work (his family's collection) was partially destroyed when Hurricane Katrina struck Ocean Springs in 2005, and the storm surge penetrated the small cinderblock building that had been built after Hurricane Camille to house safely those of his works owned by his family. There was extensive water damage to the watercolors, drawings, manuscripts, and other objects that were kept there, and much of this work, from the Anderson Family collection, was dried and removed to Mississippi State University. Some has been restored by conservator Margaret Moreland.

== Bibliography ==
Major works by and about Anderson are listed below. Most have been published by the University Press of Mississippi.

- One World, Two Artists: John Alexander and Walter Anderson, Essays by Annalyn Swan, Bradley Sumrall, and Jimmy Buffett, New Orleans: Ogden Museum of Southern Art, 2011, distributed by University of Mississippi Press
- Walter Anderson. A Symphony of Animals, Introduction by Mary Anderson Pickard, Jackson: University Press of Mississippi, 1996
- Walter Anderson, Pelicans, Preface by Mary Anderson Pickard, Afterword by Christopher Maurer, San Francisco: Cadmus Editions, 2004
- Agnes Grinstead Anderson. Approaching the Magic Hour. Memories of Walter Anderson Jackson and London: University Press of Mississippi, 1989
- Walter Anderson. Birds. Introductory essay by Mary Anderson Pickard. Jackson and London: University Press of Mississippi, 1990
- The Horn Island Logs of Walter Inglis Anderson. Edited by Redding S. Sugg Jr. Rev. ed., Jackson: University Press of Mississippi, 1985
- Walter Anderson's Illustrations of Epic and Voyage. Edited and with an introduction by Redding S. Sugg Jr. Carbondale and Edwardsville: Southern Illinois University Press; London and Amsterdam: Feffer & Simmons, 1980
- Redding S. Sugg Jr. A Painter's Psalm. The Mural from Walter Anderson's Cottage. Rev. ed. Jackson and London: University Press of Mississippi, 1992
- Walter Anderson: Realizations of the Islander. Selections of Paintings and Essay by John Paul Driscoll. The Walter Anderson Estate, 1985
- The Voluptuous Return. Still Life by Walter Inglis Anderson. Foreword by Patti Carr Black. Ocean Springs: Family of Walter Anderson, 1999
- Lisa Graley, ed. Interdisciplinary Humanities: Special Issue 2004-2005: Walter Inglis Anderson. National Association of Humanities Education. Vol. 21.1 2004
- Anne R. King. Walls of Light. The Murals of Walter Anderson. Jackson: University Press
- Christopher Maurer with Maria Estrella Iglesias, Dreaming in Clay on the Gulf of Mississippi. Life and Art at Shearwater. Jackson: University Press of Mississippi, 2010.
- Christopher Maurer, Fortune's Favorite Child: the Uneasy Life of Walter Anderson. Jackson: University Press of Mississippi, 2003
- Norma Tilden, "Walter Anderson, Zographos," Yale Review, April 2005 (No. 2).
- Dod Stewart, Shearwater Pottery, privately printed, 2005.
- Documentary film, 2005: Win Riley and David Wolf, Walter Anderson: Realizations of an Artist (with the participation of the Anderson family and critics Christopher Maurer, Paul Richards, and Patti Carr Black.)
- Mary Anderson Pickard and Patricia Pinson, editors, "Form and Fantasy: The Block Prints of Walter Anderson." Jackson: University Press of Mississippi, 2007.
- Patti Carr Black. American Masters of the Mississippi Gulf Coast : George Ohr, Dusti Bongé, Walter Anderson, Richmond Barthe. Jackson, Miss.: Mississippi Arts Commission; Starkville, Miss.: Department of Art, Mississippi State University, 2009.

Some of Anderson's best watercolors, oils, drawings, and decorated pottery may be seen at the Walter Anderson Museum of Art; the Memphis Brooks Museum; the Mississippi Museum of Art (Jackson); and the Lauren Rodgers Museum of Art (Laurel). In 2003, his work was featured in an exhibition at the Smithsonian Institution, titled "Everything I See is New and Strange."
