= Peter Anderson (artist) =

American artist

Peter Anderson gives shape to clay at the potter's wheel

Peter Anderson (December 22, 1901 – December 20, 1984) was an American ceramist and founder of Shearwater Pottery in Ocean Springs, Mississippi. He was born in New Orleans to George Walter Anderson, a grain broker, and Annette McConnell Anderson, member of a prominent New Orleans family, who had studied art at Newcomb College, where she had absorbed the ideals of the American Arts and Crafts movement.

== Career ==
In 1928, Anderson opened his business: Shearwater Pottery. The business turned, jiggered and cast pottery pieces which were then glazed. By 1931, the Shearwater pottery achieved national recognition in New York's Contemporary American Ceramics Exhibition. His pieces were also displayed at several museums including The Virginia Museum of fine Arts and the Old Capitol Museum in Jackson.

== Legacy ==
The Ocean Springs Chamber of Commerce - Main Street - Tourism Bureau in Ocean Springs, Mississippi has been hosting an annual Peter Anderson Arts and Crafts Festival for 43 years. In 2021 the two-day event hosted 150,000 visitors.
