= Ocean Springs, Mississippi =

City in the United States

Ocean Springs
- City
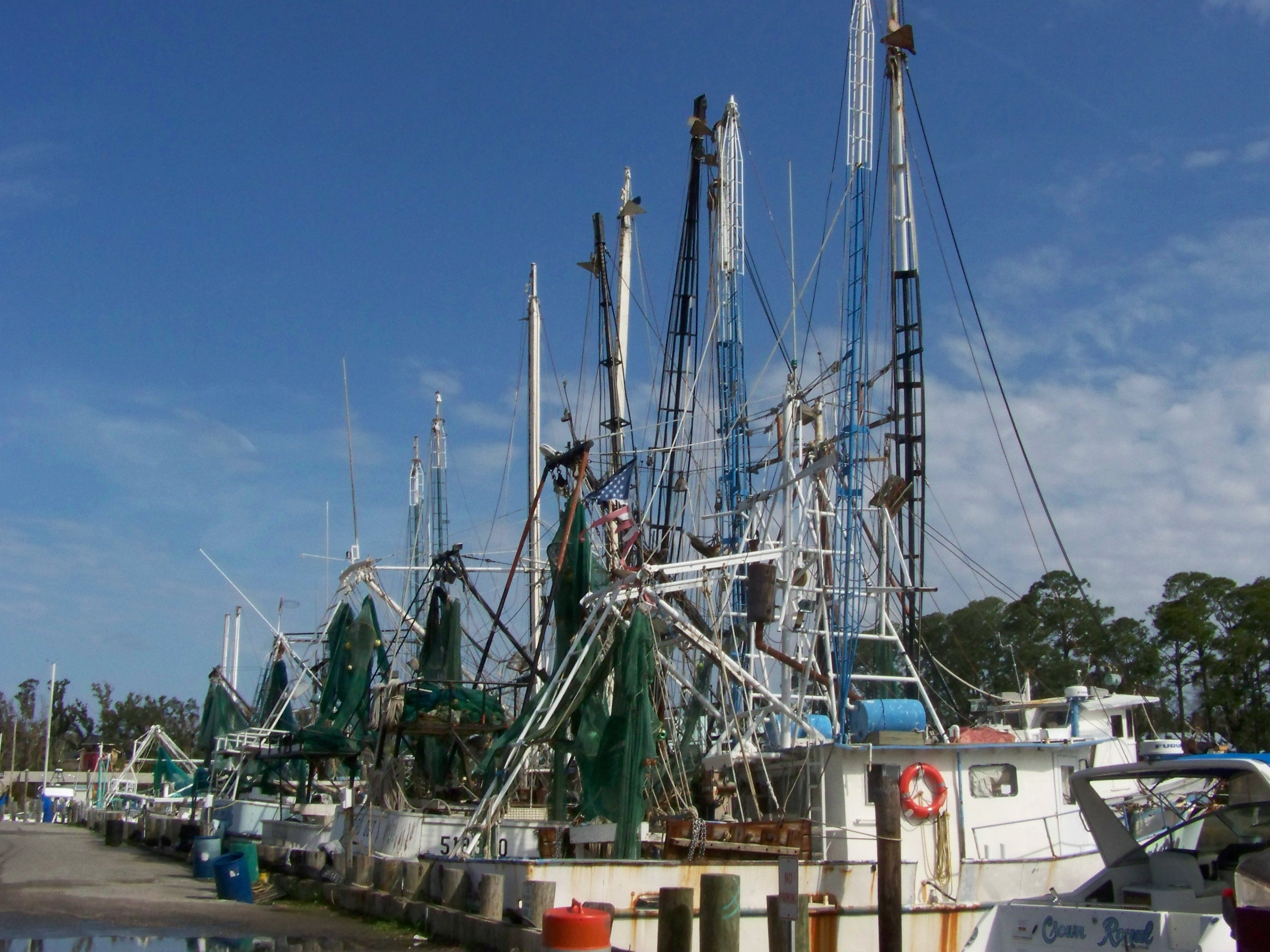
- Shrimp boats

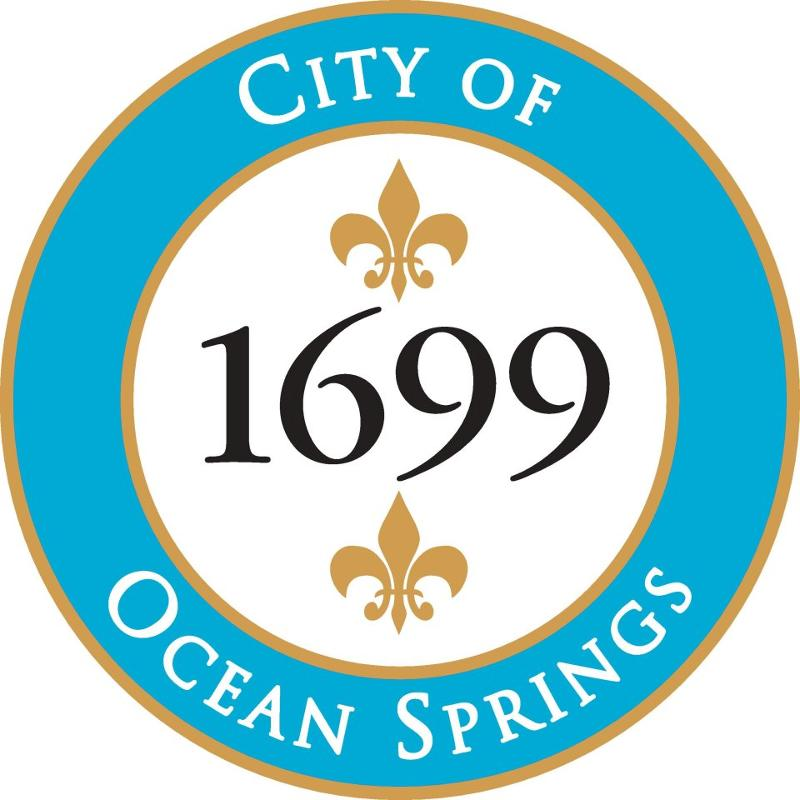
- Flag Seal Logo
- Nickname: City of Discovery
- Location of Ocean Springs, Mississippi

- Location in the contiguous United States
- Coordinates: 30°24′36″N 88°47′51″W
- Country: United States
- State: Mississippi
- County: Jackson
- Unofficially incorporated (settlement): April 1699
- Incorporated (village): 1843
- Incorporated (city): September 9, 1892

Government
  - Type: Mayor-council
  - Mayor: Bobby Cox (R)
  - Aldermen: Robert Blackmon; Matthew Hinton; Julie Messenger; Shannon Pfeiffer; Karen Stennis; Steve Tillis; Kevin N. Wade

Area
  - Total: 15.20 sq mi (39.38 km^{2})
  - Land: 11.55 sq mi (29.92 km^{2})
  - Water: 3.66 sq mi (9.47 km^{2})
- Elevation: 23 ft (7 m)

Population (2020)
  - Total: 18,429
  - Density: 1,595.5/sq mi (616.04/km^{2})
- Time zone: UTC−6 (Central (CST))
  - Summer (DST): UTC−5 (CDT)
- ZIP codes: 39564-39566
- Area code: 228
- FIPS code: 28-53520
- GNIS feature ID: 0675137
- Website: www.oceansprings-ms.gov

Ocean Springs is a city in Jackson County, Mississippi, United States, approximately 2 miles (3.2 km) east of Biloxi and west of Gautier. It is part of the Pascagoula metropolitan area. The population was 18,429 at the 2020 U.S. Census, down from 18,434 in 2010.

The town has a reputation as an arts community and is a popular tourist destination. The town was voted as a top 10 Happiest Seaside Town by Coastal Living in 2015 and was also voted as a top 10 Best Coastal Small Town by USA Today in 2022. Its historic and secluded down town area, with streets lined by live oak trees, is home to several art galleries, shops, restaurants, and bars.

Ocean Springs was the home town of the late Walter Inglis Anderson, a nationally renowned painter and muralist who drew inspiration from the natural coastal landscape and nearby barrier islands. The town hosts several festivals throughout the year, including its Peter Anderson Festival, one of the Southeast's premiere arts and crafts festivals.

Ocean Springs was severely damaged on August 29, 2005, by Hurricane Katrina, which destroyed many buildings along the shoreline, including the Ocean Springs Yacht Club, and the wooden replica of Fort Maurepas, and a local business owned by Luke Smith. Katrina's 28 ft (8.5 m) storm surge also destroyed the Biloxi Bay Bridge, which connected Biloxi to Ocean Springs. A new bridge was constructed and opened on November 1, 2007.

== History ==
The settlement of Fort Maurepas or Old Biloxi, in colonial French Louisiana (New France), began in April 1699 at present-day Ocean Springs, under the authority of King Louis XIV, as Fort Maurepas by Pierre Le Moyne d'Iberville. It was the first permanent French outpost in French Louisiana and was established as a foothold to prevent Spanish encroachment on France's colonial claims. The site was maintained well into the early 18th century.

The town was briefly called Lynchburg Springs when the first post office was established in 1853. The name Ocean Springs was coined by Dr. William Glover Austin in 1854. He believed the local springs had healing qualities. Ocean Springs became a prosperous resort town and after several years reinvented itself as a historically oriented residential community. The history of the town is celebrated annually in re enactments depicting d'Iberville's landing near a replica of Fort Maurepas. The authorities had authorized John Egan to construct and operate a public wharf near this ancient fort site at the foot of Jackson Avenue prior to the Civil War.

From colonial times to present day, seafood has been celebrated. The abundance of seafood allowed French and French-Canadian explorers and settlers to thrive within the Fort Maurepas/Old Biloxi area. In the late nineteenth century, the development of ice plant industries along the coast increased seafood sales. Locals and tourists can still purchase freshly harvested shrimp, fish, crabs, and oysters to this day because of this thriving industry.

The city is home to the Peter Anderson Festival, taking place the first weekend of November each year. The festival was first hosted in 1978 after local artist Klara Koock brought the idea to the Chamber of Commerce. The festival not only celebrates Anderson, but also the arts community.

Ocean Springs was in the international spotlight following Hurricane Katrina's landfall on August 29, 2005. The city, part of the Mississippi Gulf Coast directly hit by the storm, sustained significant damage. The Biloxi-Ocean Springs bridge, part of Highway 90 along the beach, was destroyed and was a widely broadcast visual testament to the hurricane's impact.

=== Biloxi Bay Bridge ===
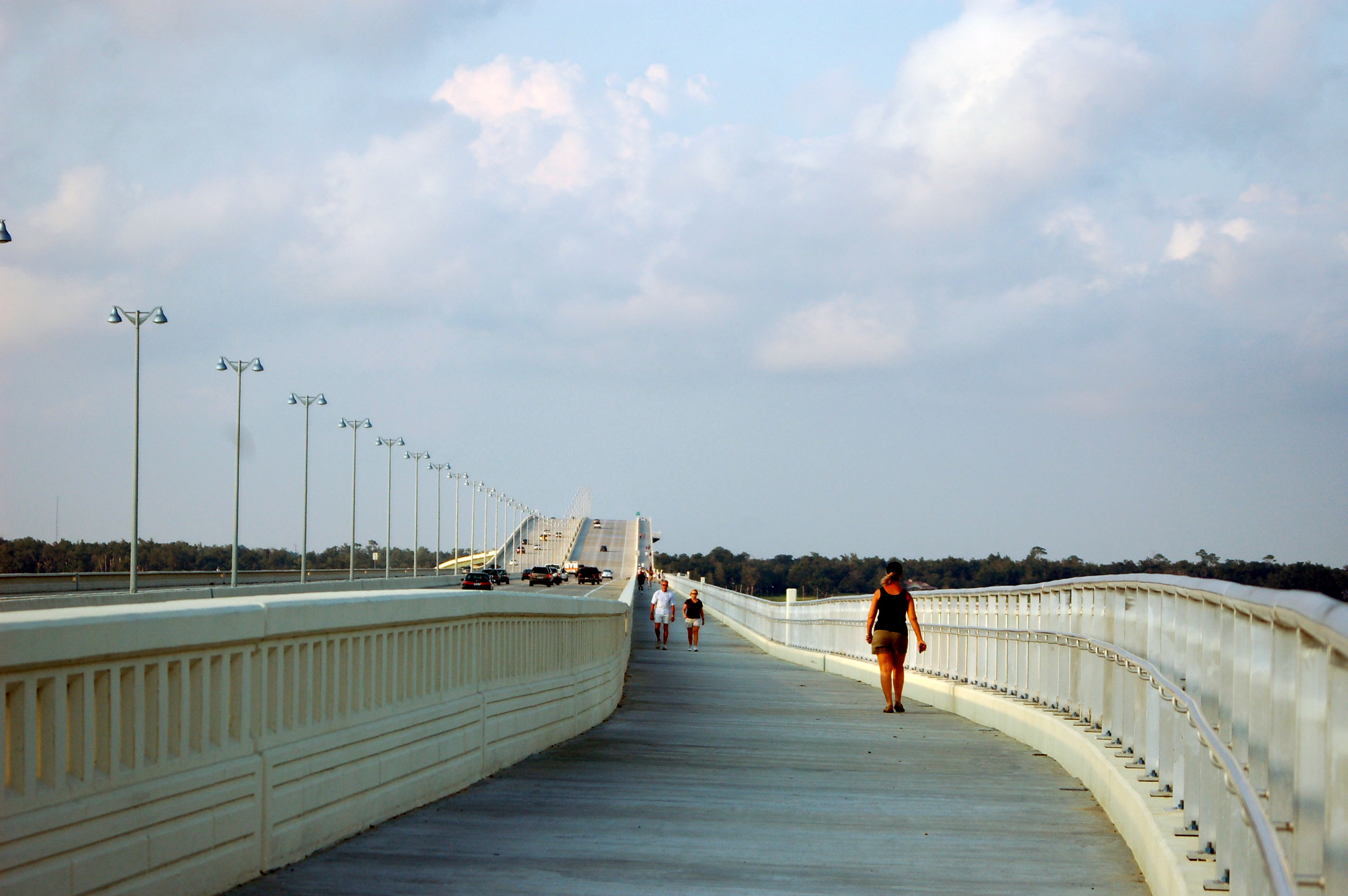
Biloxi Bay Bridge, post-Hurricane Katrina, opened in 2007

The first bridge to connect Biloxi to Ocean Springs was the War Memorial Bridge which opened on June 3, 1930. The War Memorial bridge was replaced by the 1962 Biloxi Bay Bridge, which sustained some damage in 1969 by Hurricane Camille. On August 29, 2005 Hurricane Katrina's 28-foot (8.5 m) storm surge destroyed the 1962 Biloxi Bay Bridge. As of 2007, the majority of the bridge's remains have been removed via cranes based on barges located next to the bridge debris. The bridge ruins, capturing the breathtaking results of the force of Hurricane Katrina, had become a popular spot of photographers both professional and amateur. The construction for the new bridge was completed in April 2008. The new Biloxi Bay Bridge is 95' in height at its main span, and supports six lanes of traffic. Two lanes of the six-lane bridge opened November 1, 2007. The new bridge has a curving roadway due to the implemented design-build process. In order to speed the process of rebuilding, the main body of the bridge was moved outside of the previous bridge's debris area. The landing points for each side of U.S. Route 90 correspond with the previous bridge.

== Geography ==
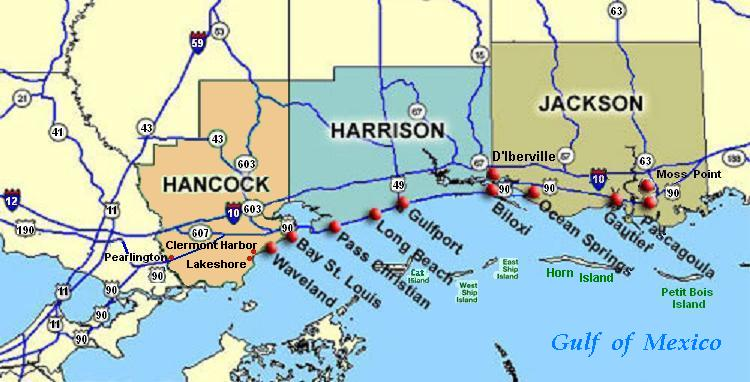
Ocean Springs, Mississippi (right center) is east of Biloxi, west of Gautier, along the Gulf of Mexico

According to the U.S. Census Bureau, the city has a total area of 15.2 square miles (39 km^{2}), of which 11.6 square miles (30 km^{2}) is land and 3.6 square miles (9.3 km^{2}) (23.57%) is water.

=== Climate ===
The city is classified as having a subtropical climate. This has a hot, humid monsoon season, beginning in late spring and ending in early autumn, with frequent afternoon and evening thunderstorms with torrential downpours. Thunderstorms usually don't last long but can be strong or even severe. The area is also prone to tropical weather such as tropical depressions, tropical storms, and hurricanes. Autumns and springs are usually cool to warm. Winters typically are warm with cool spells. Cool spells are accompanied with strong, Northerly dry winds which are unexpectedly chilly but do not typically last more than just a couple of days. Summers are consistently hot and humid both day and night with high temperatures usually in the low nineties and low temperatures oftentimes just barely below 80 degrees.

Climate data for Ocean Springs, Mississippi
Month	Jan	Feb	Mar	Apr	May	Jun	Jul	Aug	Sep	Oct	Nov	Dec	Year
Record high °F (°C)	81 (27)	80 (27)	90 (32)	93 (34)	97 (36)	102 (39)	100 (38)	104 (40)	98 (37)	93 (34)	87 (31)	80 (27)	104 (40)
Mean daily maximum °F (°C)	60 (16)	63 (17)	69 (21)	76 (24)	83 (28)	88 (31)	89 (32)	90 (32)	86 (30)	79 (26)	69 (21)	63 (17)	76 (25)
Mean daily minimum °F (°C)	45 (7)	47 (8)	53 (12)	61 (16)	68 (20)	74 (23)	76 (24)	75 (24)	71 (22)	61 (16)	53 (12)	47 (8)	61 (16)
Record low °F (°C)	10 (−12)	14 (−10)	22 (−6)	30 (−1)	45 (7)	55 (13)	60 (16)	61 (16)	45 (7)	32 (0)	25 (−4)	9 (−13)	9 (−13)
Average precipitation inches (mm)	5.07 (129)	5.45 (138)	6.11 (155)	4.48 (114)	4.57 (116)	7.07 (180)	7.13 (181)	6.23 (158)	5.58 (142)	3.82 (97)	4.75 (121)	4.76 (121)	65.02 (1,652)

== Demographics ==
Historical population
Census	Pop.	Note	%±
1870	560		—
1880	849		51.6%
1890	1,148		35.2%
1900	1,255		9.3%
1910	1,478		17.8%
1920	1,732		17.2%
1930	1,663		−4.0%
1940	1,881		13.1%
1950	3,058		62.6%
1960	5,025		64.3%
1970	9,580		90.6%
1980	14,504		51.4%
1990	13,327		−8.1%
2000	17,225		29.2%
2010	17,442		1.3%
2020	18,429		5.7%
U.S. Decennial Census

=== Racial and ethnic composition ===
Ocean Springs city, Mississippi – Racial and ethnic composition Note: the US Census treats Hispanic/Latino as an ethnic category. This table excludes Latinos from the racial categories and assigns them to a separate category. Hispanics/Latinos may be of any race.
Race / Ethnicity (NH = Non-Hispanic)	Pop 2000	Pop 2010	Pop 2020	% 2000	% 2010	% 2020
White alone (NH)	14,842	14,479	14,415	86.17%	83.01%	78.22%
Black or African American alone (NH)	1,203	1,281	1,331	6.98%	7.34%	7.22%
Native American or Alaska Native alone (NH)	66	57	64	0.38%	0.33%	0.35%
Asian alone (NH)	450	542	561	2.61%	3.11%	3.04%
Native Hawaiian or Pacific Islander alone (NH)	13	11	7	0.08%	0.06%	0.04%
Other race alone (NH)	16	34	53	0.09%	0.19%	0.29%
Mixed race or Multiracial (NH)	205	310	927	1.19%	1.78%	5.03%
Hispanic or Latino (any race)	430	728	1,071	2.50%	4.17%	5.81%
Total	17,225	17,442	18,429	100.00%	100.00%	100.00%

=== 2020 census ===
As of the 2020 census, there were 18,429 people, 7,609 households, and 4,423 families residing in the city.

The median age was 43.7 years. 21.7% of residents were under the age of 18 and 21.4% of residents were 65 years of age or older. For every 100 females there were 90.6 males, and for every 100 females age 18 and over there were 86.6 males age 18 and over.

99.0% of residents lived in urban areas, while 1.0% lived in rural areas.

There were 7,609 households in Ocean Springs, of which 29.9% had children under the age of 18 living in them. Of all households, 48.0% were married-couple households, 17.0% were households with a male householder and no spouse or partner present, and 29.5% were households with a female householder and no spouse or partner present. About 29.9% of all households were made up of individuals and 15.2% had someone living alone who was 65 years of age or older.

There were 8,264 housing units, of which 7.9% were vacant. The homeowner vacancy rate was 1.3% and the rental vacancy rate was 7.8%.

Racial composition as of the 2020 census
Race	Number	Percent
White	14,685	79.7%
Black or African American	1,351	7.3%
American Indian and Alaska Native	80	0.4%
Asian	567	3.1%
Native Hawaiian and Other Pacific Islander	10	0.1%
Some other race	316	1.7%
Two or more races	1,420	7.7%

=== 2010 census ===
As of the 2010 census, there were 17,442 people, 6,393 households, and 4,717 families residing within the city. The population density was 1,513.5 people per square mile. There were 7,814 housing units at an average density of 678.3 per square mile. The ethnic makeup of the city was 85.4% White, 7.4% African American, 0.40% Native American, 3.1% Asian, 0.1% Pacific Islander, 1.3% from other races, and 2.2% from two or more races. Hispanic or Latino of any race were 4.2% of the population.

Of the 6,393 households, 31.8% had children under the age of 18 living with them, 51.2% were married couples living together, 11.8% had a female householder with no husband present, and 32.5% were non-families. 27.1% of all households had householders living alone, and 12.5% consisted of someone living alone who was 65 years of age or older. The average household size was 2.48 and the average family size was 3.01.

In the city, the population was spread out, with 5.6% under the age of 5, 6.7% from 10 to 14, 6.6% from 15 to 19, 4.8% from 20 to 24, 5.1% from 25 to 29, 11.8% from 30 to 39, 15.4% from 40 to 49, 14.8% from 50 to 59, 11.1% from 60 to 69, and 11.6% from 70 and above. The median age was 42.1 years.

The median income for a household in Ocean Springs was $59,516, and the per capita income was $33,107. About 9.7% of the population was below the poverty line.

== Education ==
Ocean Springs is served by the Ocean Springs School District.

=== Elementary schools ===
- Pecan Park Elementary School
- Oak Park Elementary School
- Magnolia Park Elementary School
- Ocean Springs Upper Elementary

=== Middle schools ===
- Ocean Springs Middle School

=== High schools ===
- Ocean Springs High School

=== Alternative schools ===
- E. H. Keys Alternative School
- The 3-D School, Gulf Coast Campus- A special-purpose school for children with dyslexia.

== Media ==
Ocean Springs is served by the Gulfport–Biloxi–Pascagoula media market. Its primary daily newspapers is the Sun Herald. Three local television stations also serve the area: WLOX, WXVO and WXXV.

Writer Jim Beaugez, an Ocean Springs native, described the town's early 1990s vibe in an essay for Outside (magazine), detailing the "laid-back home of the late watercolorist and naturalist Walter Inglis Anderson, an eccentric who would row his skiff to uninhabited Horn Island (Mississippi), a dozen miles offshore, to paint landscapes and wildlife ... Before Ocean Springs became a destination for artsy types and vacationers staying at casinos on the other side of Biloxi Bay, all drawn by a downtown lined with shops and bars and restaurants."

== Notable people ==
- James McConnell Anderson, artist
- Peter Anderson, artist and potter
- Walter Inglis Anderson, artist
- Garrett Crochet, Major League Baseball player
- Alvin Endt, Mississippi legislator and educator
- Jeremy England, member of the Mississippi State Senate
- Ellen Gilchrist, author
- Raúl González, professional soccer player
- Jeffrey Guice, Mississippi legislator
- Gordon Gunter, scientist
- Eric L. Harry, lawyer and writer
- Osborne Helveston, former football player
- Jai Johanny Johanson, musician
- Brett Leland McLaughlin, Golden Globe nominated songwriter
- Connie Moran, former mayor of Ocean Springs
- Jeremiah Joseph O'Keefe, businessman, Mississippi state legislator, and mayor of Ocean Springs
- Laurin Pepper, football player and former Major League Baseball pitcher
- Luke Stewart, musician
- Stephen Whiting, United States Space Force lieutenant general. First commander of the Space Operations Command
- Al Young, educator and writer
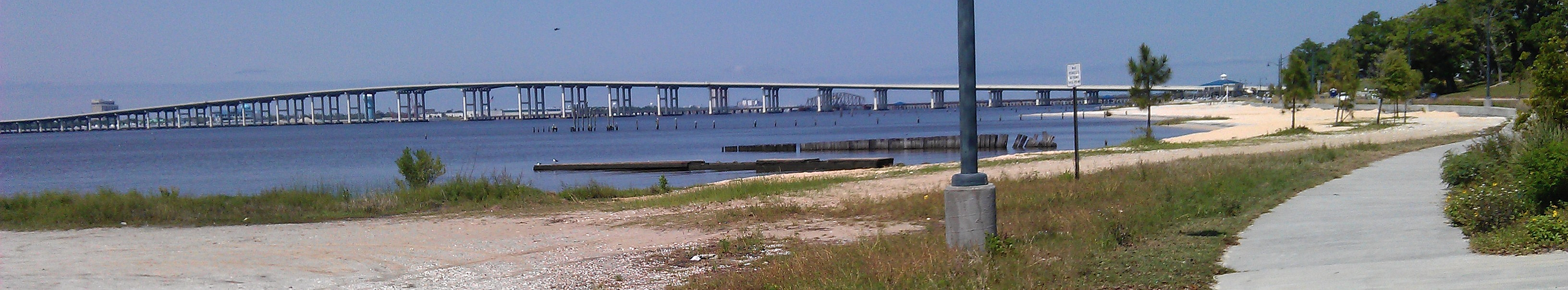
A view of Biloxi Bay and the new Biloxi Bay Bridge from Fort Maurepas State Park in Ocean Springs, 2013
