= OSSD =

OSSD may refer to:

- Ocean Springs School District
- Ontario Secondary School Diploma
- Output Signal Switching Device
- Open-source software development
