= Pilz (disambiguation) =

Pilz is a German occupational surname, which means a gatherer of mushrooms.

Pilz may also refer to:

- Pilz (company), a German automation technology company
- Pilz (record label), a German record label
- Pilz Glacier, Washington, US

== See also ==
- Pils (disambiguation)
