= Safety Network International e.V. =

Safety Network International e.V. is an association that is based in Ostfildern and is registered at Esslingen district court.

== Origin ==
Safety Network International e.V. was established by eight founding companies: ASK Systems GmbH, Dürr AG, Daimler AG, EMG Automation GmbH, Festo AG & Co.KG., SICK AG, Pilz GmbH & Co.KG. and Volkswagen AG. It was established in 1999 under the name SafetyBUS p Club International e.V. In 2006 the association changed its name to Safety Network International e.V. Almost 70 companies and institutions are now members of Safety Network International e.V. (as of 2013).

In addition to the headquarters in Germany, there are also the following regional organisations of the Safety Network International e.V.

- Safety Network Japan – established in 2000
- Safety Network International, USA – established in 2001

== Objectives ==
The purpose of the association is to promote the use and dissemination of the safety-related bus system SafetyBUS p and the industrial communication system SafetyNET p. A further objective of the association is to promote integration of the safety-related bus system SafetyBUS and the industrial communication system SafetyNET into existing and future automation technologies. Members of the association work together in the Security Workgroup, Infrastructure Committee and Implementation Committee. This is where members discuss common viewpoints, define standards and formulate recommendations. Since 2007 Safety Network International e.V. has been a "Liaison D" member of the IEC and is committed to working on standards. The association publishes its own magazine on safety and automation under the name “Connected”.
