= SafetyBUS p =

Industrial automation technology

SafetyBUS p is a standard for failsafe fieldbus communication in automation technology. It meets SIL 3 of IEC 61508 and Category 4 of EN 954-1 or Performance Level "e" of the successor standard EN 13849-1.

== Origin ==
SafetyBUS p was developed by Pilz GmbH & Co. KG between 1995 and 1999. The objective was to provide a fieldbus for data communication in terms of machinery safety .

Since 1999 the technology of SafetyBUS p has been managed by the user organisation Safety Network International e.V. (formally SafetyBUS p Club International e.V.), whose members work on the further development of SafetyBUS p.

== Application ==
The main application of SafetyBUS p lies in the communication of data with safety-related content. SafetyBUS p can be used anywhere that communicated data has to be consistent in terms of time and content, in order to safeguard against danger. This danger may concern hazards to life and limb, but may also involve the protection of economic assets.

Typical application areas are:

- Factory automation (e.g. car production, presses)
- Transport technology (e.g. cable cars, fairground rides)

SafetyBUS p can be used on applications with safety-related requirements up to SIL 3 of IEC 61508 or Cat. 4 of EN 954-1.

== Technology ==
Technically, SafetyBUS p is based on the fieldbus system CAN. In addition to OSI Layers 1 and 2, which are already defined in CAN for bit rate and security, SafetyBUS p adds additional mechanisms to safeguard transmission in Layers 2 and 7.

=== Fault mechanisms ===
The following mechanisms are used on SafetyBUS p to detect transmission errors and device errors:

- Sequential numbers
- Timeout
- Echo
- ID for transmitter and receiver
- Data security (cyclic redundancy check)

=== Technical details ===
The SafetyBUS p frame data, as determined by the technology, is as follows:

- Maximum 64 bus subscribers per network
- Up to 4000 I/O points per network
- Transmission rates 20 to 500 kbit/s, depending on the network extension
- Individual network segments can extend to up to 3500 m
- Multiple network segments can be connected
- Guaranteed error reaction times of up to 20 ms can be achieved
- Suitable for applications in accordance with SIL 3 of IEC 61508 and Cat. 4 of EN 954-1
- Option to supply voltage to the devices via the bus cable
- Subnetworks can be implemented in wireless technology, with fibre-optic cables and as an infrared connection.

=== Devices ===
Only safety-related devices are used in SafetyBUS p networks. In general these are designed to be multi-channel internally. Safety-related use of the devices normally requires safety to be certified by authorised testing laboratories, who test the devices in accordance with the applicable standards and provisions. A functional inspection is carried out by the user organisation Safety Network International e.V.

== Organisation ==
The user organisation SafetyBUS p Club International e.V. combines manufacturers and users of SafetyBUS p and has been in existence since 1999. In 2006 the organisation was renamed Safety Network International e.V. In addition to the international organisation there are also two other regional organisations: Japan was established in 2000, while USA was established in 2001. The organisation continues to develop the system, resulting in its successor, SafetyNET p.

== Literature ==
- Winfried Gräf: Maschinensicherheit. Hüthig GmbH & Co. KG, Heidelberg 2004, ISBN 3-7785-2941-2
- Armin Schwarz und Matthias Brinkmann: Praxis Profiline – SafetyBUS p – Volume D/J/E. Vogel Industrie Medien GmbH & Co. KG, Würzburg 2004, ISBN 3-8259-1919-6
- Armin Schwarz und Matthias Brinkmann: Praxis Profiline – SafetyBUS p – Volume D/E. Vogel Industrie Medien GmbH & Co. KG, Würzburg 2002, ISBN 3-8259-1915-3
- EU machinery directive: 98/37/EG
- IFA Report 2/2017: Funktionale Sicherheit von Maschinensteuerungen – Anwendung der DIN EN ISO 13849
- BG ETEM, Prüfgrundsatz GS-ET-26: Bussysteme für die Übertragung sicherheitsrelevanter Nachrichten
- Reinert, D.; Schaefer, M.: Sichere Bussysteme für die Automation. Hüthig, Heidelberg 2001. ISBN 3-7785-2797-5
