= Light barrier =

Light barrier may refer to:

- Speed of light, the upper limit for the speed at which information, matter, or energy can travel through space
- Light curtain, a safety device that detects when a beam of infrared light has been broken
