= SafetyNET p =

SafetyNET p is a standard for Ethernet-based fieldbus communication in automation technology. SafetyNET p is suitable as a drive bus due to its real-time behaviour, with cycle times of up to 62.5 μs. In accordance with the standard requirements from EN 61508 and EN 61511, it can be used in safety circuits up to and including Category 3, SIL 3.

== Origin ==
SafetyNET p is a registered trademark of Pilz GmbH & Co. KG and was presented in public for the first time in 2006. Its objective was to enable fieldbus communication on Ethernet in real-time and to simultaneously provide data communication in terms of machinery safety. SafetyNET p combines safety and automation: it is both a safety and an automation fieldbus and as such is the successor to SafetyBUS p.

The SafetyNET p technology is managed through the umbrella organisation Safety Network International e.V.

== Application ==
In addition to its use as an Ethernet-based fieldbus, a key component in the application of SafetyNET p is the communication of data with a safety-related content. SafetyNET p can be used anywhere that communicated data has to be consistent in terms of time and content, in order to safeguard against danger. This danger may concern hazards to life and limb, but may also involve the protection of economic assets.

A second application area is the communication of data in real-time. With bus cycle times of up to 62,5 μs, SafetyNET p can even be used in extremely time-critical areas.

Typical application areas are:

- Factory automation (e. g. car production, presses)
- Transport technology (e. g. cable cars, fairground rides)
- Drive technology (e. g. sensor/actuator control loop in drives or industrial robots)

In general, all automation and process engineering applications are possible.

== Technology ==
SafetyNET p is based on Ethernet. There are two different but compatible versions of SafetyNET p.

=== RTFN ===
RTFN (Real time frame network) uses conventional Ethernet IP frames for communication. The mechanisms for security and real-time are located on OSI levels 3 and above. A producer-consumer model is used as the communication principle. A central process controller (PLC) is not required. This enables concepts such as modular engineering, for example.

SafetyNET p RTFN is fully compatible with all IP-based Ethernet protocols and can be combined on the same medium. Conventional switches, routers and Wireless access points can also be used.

A system cycle time of around 1 ms can be achieved, depending on potential competing services. If higher performance is required, SafetyNET p RTFL can be used.

=== RTFL ===
RTFL (Real time frame line) uses Ethernet MAC frames for communication. A producer-consumer model is also used at logical level on RTFL. In order to achieve the required performance, communication takes place in optimised Ethernet MAC frames. The first subscriber in the logical line sends an Ethernet MAC frame to its logical neighbour, which completes its part of the frame and then passes the frame along the logical line to its nearest neighbour. This way all subscribers fill in the frame in succession. The last subscriber in the line sends the completed frame back to the first subscriber using the same channel (via all the subscribers). In the process, individual subscribers can remove the data they need as the frame passes through.

System cycle times in the area of 62.5 μs can be achieved. SafetyNET p subscribers can pack miscellaneous IP-based traffic within an RTFL frame as part of real-time communication.

=== Technical details ===
The SafetyNet p frame data, as determined by the technology, is as follows:

- Compatible with Ethernet IP protocols
- Networks can be designed in a linear, star or tree topology
- Networks with variable subscribers can be used thanks to the continuous topology scan
- The maximum distance between two subscribers corresponds to that of conventional Ethernet (this is 100 m when copper cables are used)
- With RTFN, the number of bus subscribers is limited only by the IP address space
- With RTFL you can have 512 bus subscribers per segment
- Guaranteed system cycle times of up to 62.5 μs can be achieved
- Suitable for applications in accordance with SIL 3 of IEC 61508

SafetyNET p is assigned port number 40000 on IANA’s "List of assigned port numbers".

== Organisation ==
The user organisation Safety Bus p Club International e.V. combines manufacturers and users of SafetyBUS p and has been in existence since 1999. In 2006 the organisation was renamed Safety Network International e.V. In addition to the international organisation there are also two other regional organisations: Japan was established in 2000, while the United States was established in 2001.

== Literature ==
- Winfried Gräf: Maschinensicherheit. Hüthig GmbH & Co. KG, Heidelberg 2004, ISBN 3-7785-2941-2
- Arbeitspapier der BIA: Prüfgrundsätzen für sichere Bussysteme.
- EU Maschinenrichtlinie: 98/37/EG
- Safety Network International: SafetyNET p Systembeschreibung Version 2.0
