= Output signal switching device =

Safety engineering device

An output signal switching device (OSSD) is an electronic device used as part of the safety system of a machine. When monitored safety conditions (e.g. optically scanned opening) transition from safe to unsafe condition state (are tripped) - OSSD immediately signals the machine to shut down via hardwired safety output channel signals. As a further layer of redundancy protection, it provides a current-sourcing PNP safety output signals with built-in test pulses (or other method of detecting faults) on two parallel channels to detect any combination of shorting or miswiring. This is accomplished by converting the standard direct current supply, usually 24 volts, into two pulsed and out-of-phase safety output signals. The benefit of this is to avoid the possibility of a stray signal keeping the machine operating while actually in an unsafe condition.

== Typical Application ==
The typical application is a machine guard or light curtain that is protecting an automated manufacturing cell containing a robot, press or some other type of dangerous machinery. If the machine guard is open, it is possible that someone is attempting to access the machinery. In this case, the sensor is "tripped", and power is removed from the robot. The tripped state is the 0 VDC state.

If the guard is closed, then the machine is allowed to operate. This is the "active" state or "non-tripped" condition, normally 24 VDC.

OSSD resolves a specific problem. If the wires connecting to the sensor become shorted, then an open guard could read closed. This is hazardous if someone is present. OSSD prevents a short circuit from detecting as a guard closed.

In many applications OSSD sensors are used in a dual-channel configuration. The likelihood of an accidental short circuit can be very low. However, electronics can fail shorted. In some applications, the possibility of a deliberate short circuit exists. Correctly utilized, OSSD prevents the guard from reading as closed due to any electrical short circuit in the sensor wiring or electronic circuit.

== Technical description ==
The device usually acts as the interface of a sensor (such as a light curtain), designed to signal a safety-related event, typically when the light curtain beam's being "broken". OSSD signals are the outputs from the protective device (light curtain or scanner) to a safety relay. OSSD outputs are typically semiconductor or transistor outputs, as opposed to relay or contact type outputs. There are usually two independent channels, so-called OSSD1 and OSSD2.

The non-tripped state is typically 24 VDC, and the tripped state (when the safety barrier has been violated) 0 VDC. If a wire were to break between the light curtain and the safety relay, the safety relay would trip to the safe state.

The OSSD outputs are self-checked. In the non-tripped state, the outputs periodically pulse low. The protective device checks the output, to make sure it does indeed go low when commanded. If not, the output may have failed or has shorted to 24V somewhere else. Between OSSD1 and OSSD2 the pulse intervals are staggered to check for crisscrossed wiring between the two.

The technology relies on two independent channels carrying the same information output by the device:

The OSSD technology and a classification of timing and other properties are described in the "Position Paper CB24I" issued by ZVEI - German Electrical and Electronic Manufacturer's Association. OSSD signals are typically of Interface type C as described in CB24I.

- Idle signal is 24 V, periodically shortly pulsed to 0 V (pulses are not synchronous) in order for the receiver to ensure no shortcut to either 0 V or 24 V.
- Active signal is issued when both lines present 0 V; a single line presenting 0 V for a duration longer than the test pulses is sufficient to signal an event.

Some related terms:

- Electrosensitive protective equipment (ESPE) - a device such as a light curtain, safety scanner, or gate position sensor. The ESPE has OSSD outputs.
- External Device Monitor (EDM). The device issuing the OSSD signals may have an EDM input. The EDM is used to verify that the controlled device (safety relay) did indeed open when the OSSD signals were dropped. The safety relay has normally closed contacts, which close when the relay is de-energized, thereby turning on the EDM input.

== See also ==
- Automation
- Safety engineering
