= Pils =

Pils may refer to

- Pilsner, a type of beer

== People ==
- Bernhard Pils (born 20 October 1961), Austrian tennis player
- François Pils (1785–1867), French soldier and painter, father of Isidore
- Isidore Pils (1813/15-1875), French painter

== See also ==
- Rīgas pils or Riga Castle
- Rigas Sporta Pils, an ice hockey arena
- Pilz (disambiguation)
