= Death of Nolan Wells =

2026 death in Mississippi

- Wells (second from right) depicted boating with friends on July 4, 2026, the day of his disappearance
- Date: July 4, 2026 (missing); July 6, 2026 (body discovered)
- Location: Horn Island, Mississippi, U.S.; 30°14′N 88°40′W
- Cause: Undetermined; circumstances consistent with accidental drowning
- Deaths: Nolan Wells, aged 18
- Inquiries: Official: Jackson County Sheriff's Office; Mississippi Department of Public Safety; Independent: Wells family
- Charges: None (Note: A grand jury declined to bring criminal charges related to Wells' death after finding no evidence of wrongdoing.)

On July 4, 2026, 18-year-old Nolan Wells went missing after attending an Independence Day gathering on Horn Island, a barrier island off the Mississippi Gulf Coast, with a group of friends. His body was discovered on the shoreline of the island two days later. Investigators initially reported that there was no evidence of foul play and that drowning was suspected. In September 2026, a grand jury declined to bring criminal charges in the case, deeming Wells' death consistent with drowning and finding no evidence of criminal conduct.

The Wells family and their attorney, Benjamin Crump, questioned the circumstances surrounding the death and alleged that the investigation was racially biased. The Wells family and their independent inquiry have received support from the Black community, several celebrities, and activists. Allegations of misconduct have been denied by public officials, and Crump's involvement has been criticized by some officials, pundits, and at least one of Wells' friends and another friend's father. The case has also been subject to misinformation, conspiracy theories, harassment, and threats directed at those involved in the event.

== Nolan Wells ==
Nolan Xavier Wells was born on August 19, 2007, to Christine Wells-Wonsley and was raised in Ocean Springs, Mississippi. He graduated from Ocean Springs High School in 2025. At the time of his disappearance and death, he was attending and playing football as a wide receiver at Southwest Mississippi Community College.

== Background ==
The precise circumstances surrounding Wells' disappearance and death remain unclear.

On July 4, 2026, Wells and his friends went on a boat trip to Horn Island, an isolated, federally protected barrier island that sits about 5 miles (8 km) off the Mississippi coast in the Gulf of Mexico, where roughly 300 people, many of them former high school classmates, were gathering for the holiday. The island is accessible only via private boat, and according to the National Park Service, "there is no staff, drinking water, shelter, facilities, or communication on the island". GPS data from the boat shows its departing from the dock at the mainland at 9:56 a.m. (CST) and arriving at Horn Island at 11:14 a.m.

Wells had known his friends since high school, and the group was racially and ethnically diverse and described as tight-knit by Wells' friend Tracestin Shepherd, who is biracial. According to the Wells family, it was not unusual for Wells and his friends to venture to this island. A photograph from that day shows Wells on a boat with his arms casually over the shoulders of friends, and he was also depicted consuming alcohol. Witnesses told authorities he had been drinking heavily on the island. A friend described the party on the island as getting rowdier as time went on.

== Disappearance ==
Wells was recorded on a boat with two older adults at 2:23 p.m., which is the last known image or video of Wells. Ashlee Cole, a local judge, spoke on behalf of her stepson Warren Hudson, who was friends with Wells and with him on the day of his disappearance. She stated Hudson last saw Wells at 3 p.m. and that Hudson returned to the mainland around 4:30 p.m., after the boat he was on experienced problems with the bilge pump and taking on water. NBC News obtained audio showing a call to Sea Tow, a towing company, around 4 p.m., requesting assistance with the boat. The caller stated that the boat had "like seven" passengers, and when the dispatcher asked about the well-being of the passengers, he said, "Yeah, yeah everybody is on board". Hudson stated that they received assistance from another boater nearby; another of Wells' friends identified himself as having provided that assistance and as having towed the boat a short distance, after which it functioned normally. The Mississippi Department of Marine Resources (MDMR) states the boat was towed 2.75 miles (4.43 km) before resuming normal operations. Sea Tow stated they did not tow the boat after the caller informed them the issue had been resolved. GPS data shows the boat departed the island at 4:31 p.m., returned to Fort Bayou at 5:52 p.m., and docked at 6:06 p.m.

Cole stated that Wells decided to stay back on the island and return with a different group of friends. This account was corroborated by another friend, Tracestin Shepherd, who stated Wells stayed back because of a young woman he had met and become acquainted with. Wells' parents and another friend who was present on the island, Jayvon Williams, have suggested that Wells' separating from the friends group would be out of character. According to TMZ, sources connected with the official investigation have said Wells was seen on the island after the boat departed, and Hudson stated on The Officer Tatum Show that he had "talked to somebody personally" who saw Wells on the island around 6 p.m.

At 7:19 p.m., the boat exited the water and traveled to the owner's residence in Biloxi, Mississippi. Hudson called Wells' parents later that night, at 11 p.m., and Wells' parents reported him missing to authorities that night. The U.S. Coast Guard reported receiving a phone call from one of Wells' friends around 11 p.m. as well but that it did not "require Coast Guard assistance". Wells' parents used a tracking app to locate Wells' cell phone and his car keys with a friend on the mainland. His car was located at a different location.

== Search and investigation ==
On July 5, the Jackson County sheriff's office announced its coordination with the U.S. Coast Guard and Mississippi's Department of Marine Resources to search for Wells in the area surrounding the island. The National Park Service and the United Cajun Navy also assisted in the search.

On the morning of July 6, Wells' body was discovered along the shoreline of the island by a park ranger, and he was identified using dental records. Jackson County sheriff John Ledbetter stated there were no signs of foul play and he suspected drowning as a possible circumstance of death. It has been noted that the area is known for strong and potentially dangerous currents. Todd Terrell, president of the United Cajun Navy, stated Wells was discovered "face down" and "fully clothed" in an area not far from rip currents. Terrell later clarified that Wells was clothed only in his swim trunks after Crump questioned why Wells would be fully clothed, considering he was last pictured shirtless, shoeless, and with swim trunks on. Jackson County coroner Bruce Lynd said there were no obvious signs of physical injury, though the official autopsy and toxicology report, performed by the Mississippi Medical Examiner's Office, had not been completed at that time. On July 30, it was reported that the autopsy had been completed.

The Jackson County District Attorney's Office stated that the autopsy and the results of the investigation, once completed, would be presented to a grand jury, which is standard for most unnatural or suspicious deaths. District Attorney Angel Myers McIlrath has stated key pieces of evidence regarding the case, including the autopsy, would not be publicly disclosed until after being presented to the grand jury to ensure the integrity of the legal process.

On September 22, 2026, it was reported that that grand jury had found no evidence of criminal conduct and declined to bring charges related to Wells' death. The cause of death was undetermined by the state medical examiner, but the grand jury found Wells' death to be consistent with drowning, a "diagnosis by exclusion," considering the absence of evidence for other causes. Wells' body had two bruises, including one on the back of the head, but neither was deemed fatal.

=== Wells family concerns and independent investigation ===
On July 7, the Wells family retained Benjamin Crump, a civil rights attorney, to represent them as the investigation unfolds. In August, the NAACP joined the legal team for the family. The family has stated they believe race is factoring into how the death is being investigated, and Crump has stated the family is skeptical about Wells staying on the island without his cell phone, and insist he was a strong swimmer. Crump has stated there are contradictions in what has been reported by those at the party. He states the young woman Wells had been with at the party said he had returned to the boat with the other boys, which he believes contradicts the boys' account of the day.

The family retrieved Wells' cell phone on the night of July 4 from a friend of his on the mainland, after using a tracking app. Wells' aunt looked through the phone and found no photographs or videos on Wells' Snapchat from that day, which they considered unusual because of his typical social media activity. They speculated that things may have been deleted from the phone. Regarding Wells leaving behind his phone while on the island, Crump questioned this narrative. However, Tracestin Shepherd told ABC News that it was not unusual for people to leave their phones behind in boats in parties of this nature, saying, "All our friends are out there. Who are we communicating with? And we're in salt water. We're not in fresh water" and that Wells had left his phone on the "[boat] dash with probably 15 other phones".

Crump has circulated a video appearing to show an argument that had taken place on the island and a separate photograph of Wells in a swimming pool with a group of people on the mainland. On a social media post, Crump suggested that Wells could have returned to the mainland early on July 5, then died, and his body disposed of in the ocean to be discovered on July 6. He also says he has received tips that Wells was involved in a confrontation on the island. However, Shepherd stated that the photograph in the pool was taken on June 27, not July 4. Crump states that in the video Wells says, "Give me my freaking phone! What are you freaking doing?". Sheriff Ledbetter has said the video is being considered in the investigation.

Tracestin Shepherd told ABC News the voice that appears in the video is him, not Wells, and that Wells does not appear in the video. Furthermore, Shepherd stated the confrontation involved himself, not Wells, and another man over Shepherd's girlfriend, and Rolling Stone says Shepherd's account of the confrontation has been corroborated by Shepherd's girlfriend and by his uncle, both of whom were present on the island. Shepherd further stated the figure identified as Wells in the video is not him (Wells was nearby, off frame), while Jayvon Williams said the voice in the video was not Wells but he was unable to determine if the figure was Wells or not. Both Williams and Shepherd are black or biracial.

Crump and the family ordered a second, independent autopsy in Washington, D.C. and hired an expert to determine if anything was deleted from his cell phone.

On July 20, Wells' family sent spoliation letters, stating an intention to sue and demanding certain categories of evidence be preserved, to many of Wells' friends and their parents.

On July 22, the results of the independent autopsy were published. The autopsy was performed by forensic pathologist Dr. Roger A. Mitchell Jr., the president of Howard University Hospital. He found no signs of bone fracture or deep tissue injuries, but noted "red discoloration" on the back of Wells' skull, of which he could not determine the cause. He was unable to determine the manner of death, and could not rule out "non-accidental factors" without further investigation. The autopsy had limiting factors due to the state of decomposition and the fact that a past autopsy had already been performed. Wells' lungs and neck structures had already been removed from the state autopsy, which is not unusual practice. Nonetheless, it made it impossible for Mitchell to determine if he had injuries to his neck or if water had entered his lungs.

On September 24, Wells' family released the Mississippi State Medical Examiner’s autopsy report, three days after the grand jury’s findings. Crump and his team held a news conference, highlighting the state autopsy's findings that there was no fluid or debris in Wells’ airways and there was an empty stomach. The absence of water in Wells' stomach, lungs, and throat raised questions about the grand jury’s findings of accidental drowning.

Andrew Garrett, a digital forensics expert hired by Crump's team and the CEO of Garrett Discovery, was able to recover nearly 300 Snaps between Wells and his friend group. Crump referred to the messages as "telling", with some of Wells' friends being concerned about how people on Horn Island can be racist. Crump did not identify the individuals who wrote the messages. In a Sept. 23 letter to Crump, Garrett established that certain messages sent to Wells were unsent or deleted by their senders. At the news conference, Garrett reiterated that "there were things that were deleted from the phone" and added that "there were interactions with the phone before and after [Wells'] death up until the time that his family retrieved the phone from the other young men that were with him that day".

District Attorney McIlrath responded to the news conference by defending the grand jury investigation, noting that neither the state autopsy nor independent examination ruled out drowning, and maintaining that the user activity discussed during the news conference came from other Snapchat users, not Wells’ phone. Edward Paltzik, an attorney representing some of Wells' friends, also reiterated that they never had the phone. Crump held another event calling for a federal investigation on October 5, accompanied by Wells' parents and Stop AAPI Hate co-founder Cynthia Choi. Representative Maxine Waters planned to speak but was unable to attend.

== Reactions ==
Wells' death has led to speculation of malfeasance amongst black activists, social media users, and internet sleuths. Commentary has also veered into misinformation and conspiracy theories. The response is, in part, because of Mississippi's history of racial tension and the fact that Wells, who was black and Filipino, disappeared in a majority-white space.

His death has received a response in the black community, and the Congressional Black Caucus has called for an independent investigation, which they doubled down on in August 2026 by requesting the U.S. Department of Justice to launch a federal review of the case. A GoFundMe page for the Wells family has raised $320,000, as of July 16. Several celebrities, such as Tyler Perry, who agreed to pay for Wells' funeral, former NFL quarterback Colin Kaepernick, who paid for an independent autopsy to be done on Wells, and other celebrities such as musicians Eric Benet, MC Lyte, and film director Spike Lee, all agreed to support the Wells family, and help them with the case. Whoopi Goldberg and Sunny Hostin both indicated there are potentially legitimate questions surrounding race because of the circumstances of his death and the history of Mississippi. Al Sharpton stated, "We're not bringing in race, but we're not discounting race either". Wells' funeral was held on July 20, and was officiated by Sharpton. Sharpton said there are "many unanswered questions" and promised $100,000 for any information about the circumstances of Wells' death. On July 27, a march was held for Wells in Gulfport, Mississippi, and a vigil was held in his honor on August 19, on what would have been his 19th birthday.

Mississippi Governor Tate Reeves criticized Crump on social media site X for his statements concerning the investigation, and reiterated his confidence in the integrity of the investigation by the Jackson County Sheriff's Office and the Mississippi Department of Public Safety. Likewise, State Senator Jeremy England expressed confidence in the official investigation. Charles Ramsey, a law enforcement analyst for CNN, said it is a "disservice to the family" to jump to conclusions before the autopsy is released and said there was nothing unusual about the timeline of the investigation. Jason Whitlock, in a BlazeTV segment, denounced Crump for racializing Wells' death, stating, "All of these leaders, they've all been installed. They've all been installed to promote chaos. And there's no bigger example than Ben Crump" and "he’s been allowed to parachute in like a carpetbagger, to parachute into Mississippi, and just to stir racial animus". Shepherd, who is biracial, has criticized Crump for framing the case about race, saying "They're trying to spin a narrative that's not there" and "We all cared and loved Nolan, and nobody wanted to see Nolan die. Nobody wanted his life taken so short". Sarah Fields criticized Crump for sharing the unverified image of Wells in the pool, and said misinformation and rumors can lead to innocent people being targeted.

Ben Hudson, the father of Warren Hudson, stated in an interview with the New York Post that he intended on suing Crump for comments made while representing the Wells family, saying that Crump has "slandered and falsely accused my son and his friends of murder and he's pursued what's an obvious false narrative". Crump responded saying, "We're not trying to cast aspersions on anybody, we want the truth" and "If it was your child, you'd want the same thing". Three of Wells' friends—Warren Hudson, Jax Pitalo, Morgan Seymour—launched a GiveSendGo to defend themselves against potential lawsuits and to pursue "slander and libel" against them. As of August 3, the fundraiser has raised over $90,000. They later filed an intent-to-sue letter accusing Al Sharpton of defamation.

On July 16, Representative Henry Zuber III of Jackson County made a motion of adjournment to honor Wells in the Mississippi House of Representatives.

=== Harassment and threats ===
Some of those connected with the case have received threats, which are being investigated by the FBI. Shepherd stated that he and others he knows have received threats online, and Cole stated that she and her son had to delete their social media profiles over this issue. Christine Wonsley said she has received hate mail. Responding to rumors online, Cole released a timeline provided to her by her son, Christine Wonsley debunked an AI generated video of her, and Wells' grandfather Christopher Wells Sr. made a social media post condemning rumors, a sentiment also expressed by the Jackson County NAACP President Curley Clark.

A man from Sacramento, California was arrested on July 30 after being indicted by a federal grand jury on one felony count for allegedly sending threatening messages to Cole on Facebook. The next day, a woman from Ohio was arrested for allegedly making bomb threats to the George County Chancery Clerk and the Jackson County Sheriff's Office. On August 4, an Illinois man was arrested and later indicted by a federal grand jury for allegedly threatening witnesses in the Wells case. All three face charges of making interstate threatening communications. On August 12, a Florida man was arrested and accused of making threats to kidnap and injure a witness.

== See also ==
- List of solved missing person cases (2020s)
