= Multi Autonomous Ground-robotic International Challenge =

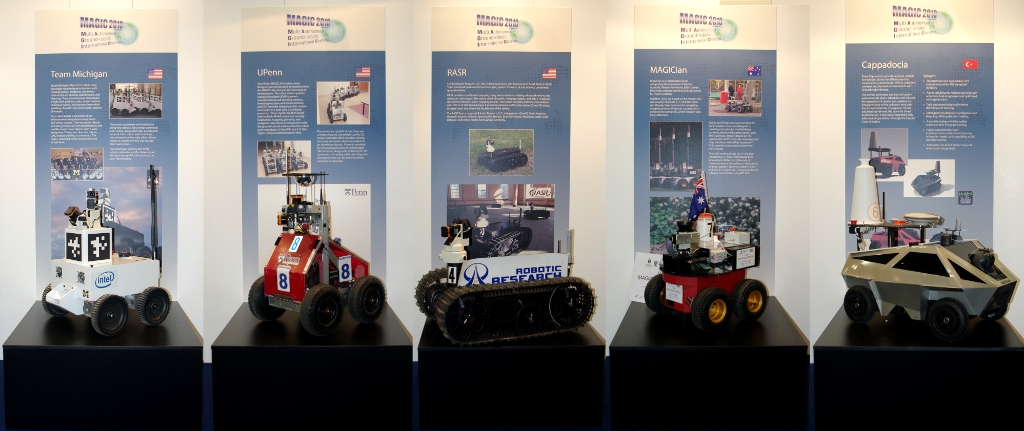
Left to right: first Team Michigan, second U. Penn, third RASR, fourth MAGICian WAMbot, fifth Cappadocia

The Multi Autonomous Ground-robotic International Challenge (MAGIC) is a 1.6 million dollar prize competition for autonomous mobile robots funded by TARDEC and the DSTO, the primary research organizations for Tank and Defense research in the United States and Australia respectively. The goal of the competition is to create multi-vehicle robotic teams that can execute an intelligence, surveillance and reconnaissance mission in a dynamic urban environment. The challenge required competitors to map a 500 m x 500 m challenge area in under 3.5 hours and to correctly locate, classify and recognise all simulated threats. The challenge event was conducted in Adelaide, Australia, during November 2010.

== Competitors ==
Initially 12 teams were selected for the competition in November 2009, of which 10 teams received funding. These included:

- MAGICian – Adelaide/Perth, Australia (UWA, ECU, Flinders, Thales)
- Strategic Engineering – Adelaide, Australia (U. Adelaide)
- Northern Hunters – Canada (Royal Military College of Canada)
- Chiba Team – Japan (Chiba University)
- Cappadocia – Ankara, Turkey (ASELSAN, Ohio State University)
- RASR – Gaithersburg, Md. (Robotics Research, LLC; QinetiQ; Embry-Riddle Aeronautical University)
- Team Cornell – US (Cornell University)
- Team Michigan – Ann Arbor, Mich. (University of Michigan)
- Virginia Tech – US (Virginia Tech)
- University of Pennsylvania – Philadelphia (University of Pennsylvania)
- Numinence – Brisbane, Australia (Numinence Pty Ltd, La Trobe University)
- UNSW – Sydney, Australia (UNSW)

The first downselection trial required teams to map an indoor area and outdoor area, and to demonstrate distributing and handing over tasks between robots. During the first downselection trial, the top six teams were selected:

- Cappadocia – Ankara, Turkey
- MAGICian – Adelaide/Perth, Australia
- RASR – Gaithersburg, Md.
- Team Michigan – Ann Arbor, Mich.
- University of Pennsylvania – Philadelphia
- Chiba Team – Japan

Before the finals were held, Chiba Team withdrew from the competition, leaving five competitors.

== Event ==
Ultimately the overall goal of fully autonomous operations without human intervention was not achieved, however, the Secretary for Defence stated "The competing vehicles demonstrated new advances in robotics technology, which are very promising for their potential deployment in combat zones where they can replace our troops in carrying out life-threatening tasks" and considered the competition a success.

== Results ==
The official results of the competition were:

- First – Team Michigan ($750,000 prize)
- Second – University of Pennsylvania ($250,000 prize)
- Third – RASR ($100,000 prize)
- Fourth – MAGICian & Cappadocia

The "Old Ram Shed Challenge" was a single-day competition held after the completion of MAGIC. It was smaller in scale, allowing all of the teams to demonstrate their systems during a single day. The University of Pennsylvania won this challenge, having found a greater number of the target objects than the other teams.

== Technology ==
Key technology used by all teams was computer vision, sensor fusion, human-robot interaction, and simultaneous localization and mapping (SLAM).

- Team Michigan, a collaboration between the University of Michigan's APRIL Lab and Soar Technology, Inc., had the largest fleet of 14 robots, developed their own Inertial Measurement Unit, and created their skid steer robot chassis out of Baltic birch plywood. Additionally, they had minimal reliance on GPS and used bandwidth limited 900 MHz radios for all telemetry, imaging, and status communications between all robots and the ground station. The code was written primarily in Java and each robot was equipped with an actuated 2D LIDAR, along with a unique 2D barcode for inter-robot recognition.
- The University of Pennsylvania team consisted of only four members. All code was written using Matlab. The robots were equipped with omnidirectional vision.
- RASR used the Foster-Miller TALON vehicle.
- MAGICian used the WAMbot robots developed by The University of Western Australia, Edith Cowan University and Thales Australia. Code was written in C++ and Java. The robots were equipped with SICK laser scanners.

See the September/October 2012 special issue of the Journal of Field Robotics for contest highlights, technical approaches taken by several of the teams, and an explanation of the evaluation metrics used by organizers.
