= Gulf Park Estates, Mississippi =

- Census-designated place
- Location of Gulf Park Estates, Mississippi

- Location in the United States
- Coordinates: 30°22′37″N 88°45′38″W
- Country: United States
- State: Mississippi
- County: Jackson

Area
  - Total: 2.79 sq mi (7.22 km^{2})
  - Land: 2.66 sq mi (6.88 km^{2})
  - Water: 0.14 sq mi (0.35 km^{2})
- Elevation: 16 ft (5 m)

Population (2020)
  - Total: 5,972
  - Density: 2,249.5/sq mi (868.55/km^{2})
- Time zone: UTC-6 (Central (CST))
  - Summer (DST): UTC-5 (CDT)
- ZIP code: 39564
- Area code: 228
- FIPS code: 28-29660
- GNIS feature ID: 0689021

Gulf Park Estates is an unincorporated community and census-designated place (CDP) located south of Ocean Springs in Jackson County, Mississippi, United States. It is part of the Pascagoula Metropolitan Statistical Area. As of the 2020 census, Gulf Park Estates had a population of 5,972.

== Geography ==
Gulf Park Estates is located in southwestern Jackson County at 30°22′37″N 88°45′38″W (30.376932, -88.760579). It is 13 miles (21 km) west of Pascagoula, the county seat, and 9 miles (14 km) east of Biloxi.

According to the United States Census Bureau, the CDP has a total area of 2.8 square miles (7.2 km^{2}), of which 2.7 square miles (6.9 km^{2}) are land and 0.1 square miles (0.3 km^{2}), or 4.78%, are water.

== Demographics ==
Historical population
Census	Pop.	Note	%±
2000	4,272		—
2010	5,719		33.9%
2020	5,972		4.4%
U.S. Decennial Census

=== Racial and ethnic composition ===
Gulf Park Estates CDP, Mississippi – Racial and ethnic composition Note: the US Census treats Hispanic/Latino as an ethnic category. This table excludes Latinos from the racial categories and assigns them to a separate category. Hispanics/Latinos may be of any race.
Race / Ethnicity (NH = Non-Hispanic)	Pop 2000	Pop 2010	Pop 2020	% 2000	% 2010	% 2020
White alone (NH)	3,864	4,688	4,423	90.45%	81.97%	74.06%
Black or African American alone (NH)	154	447	580	3.60%	7.82%	9.71%
Native American or Alaska Native alone (NH)	16	22	28	0.37%	0.38%	0.47%
Asian alone (NH)	66	156	164	1.54%	2.73%	2.75%
Native Hawaiian or Pacific Islander alone (NH)	1	2	1	0.02%	0.03%	0.02%
Other race alone (NH)	3	8	18	0.07%	0.14%	0.30%
Mixed race or Multiracial (NH)	70	134	316	1.64%	2.34%	5.29%
Hispanic or Latino (any race)	98	262	442	2.29%	4.58%	7.40%
Total	4,272	5,719	5,972	100.00%	100.00%	100.00%

=== 2020 census ===
As of the 2020 census, there were 5,972 people, 2,145 households, and 1,607 families residing in the CDP.

The median age was 37.5 years. 26.0% of residents were under the age of 18 and 13.0% of residents were 65 years of age or older. For every 100 females, there were 93.3 males, and for every 100 females age 18 and over, there were 90.7 males age 18 and over.

100.0% of residents lived in urban areas, while 0.0% lived in rural areas.

Of all households, 38.8% had children under the age of 18 living in them. 51.4% were married-couple households, 16.3% were households with a male householder and no spouse or partner present, and 24.3% were households with a female householder and no spouse or partner present. About 20.3% of all households were made up of individuals, and 7.8% had someone living alone who was 65 years of age or older.

There were 2,359 housing units, of which 7.2% were vacant. The homeowner vacancy rate was 0.9% and the rental vacancy rate was 13.5%.

=== 2000 census ===
As of the census of 2000, there were 4,272 people, 1,537 households, and 1,188 families residing in the CDP. The population density was 1,610.1 inhabitants per square mile (621.7/km^{2}). There were 1,624 housing units at an average density of 612.1 per square mile (236.3/km^{2}). The racial makeup of the CDP was 91.90% White, 3.60% African American, 0.37% Native American, 1.54% Asian, 0.02% Pacific Islander, 0.75% from other races, and 1.80% from two or more races. Hispanic or Latino of any race were 2.29% of the population.

There were 1,537 households, out of which 44.4% had children under the age of 18 living with them, 62.6% were married couples living together, 10.5% had a female householder with no husband present, and 22.7% were non-families. 17.0% of all households were made up of individuals, and 2.7% had someone living alone who was 65 years of age or older. The average household size was 2.78 and the average family size was 3.14.

In the CDP, the population was spread out, with 30.2% under the age of 18, 8.0% from 18 to 24, 36.4% from 25 to 44, 19.7% from 45 to 64, and 5.8% who were 65 years of age or older. The median age was 34 years. For every 100 females, there were 98.6 males. For every 100 females age 18 and over, there were 97.1 males.

The median income for a household in the CDP was $47,647, and the median income for a family was $49,211. Males had a median income of $32,138 versus $26,503 for females. The per capita income for the CDP was $17,978. About 6.0% of families and 6.7% of the population were below the poverty line, including 10.0% of those under age 18 and 3.2% of those age 65 or over.

== Education ==
Gulf Park Estates is served by the Ocean Springs School District.

=== Elementary schools (grades PreK-3) ===
- Magnolia Park Elementary School

=== Upper elementary schools (grades 4-6) ===
- Ocean Springs Upper Elementary

=== Middle schools (grades 7-8) ===
- Ocean Springs Middle School

=== High schools (grades 9-12) ===
- Ocean Springs High School
