= Ocean Springs High School =

Location
- 6701 Old Spanish Trail; Ocean Springs, Mississippi 39564; United States; 30°23′42″N 88°43′10″W

Information
- Motto: Arts, Academics, Athletics
- School district: Ocean Springs School District
- Superintendent: Michael Lindsay
- CEEB code: 252205
- Principal: Jacob Dykes
- Staff: 126.66 (on an FTE basis)
- Grades: 9–12
- Enrollment: 1,951 (2023–2024)
- Student to teacher ratio: 15.40
- Colors: Blue and grey
- Nickname: Greyhounds
- Website: oshs.ossdms.org

Ocean Springs High School is an IB-certified public high school in Ocean Springs, Mississippi. The school serves students in grades 9–12 and is part of the Ocean Springs School District.

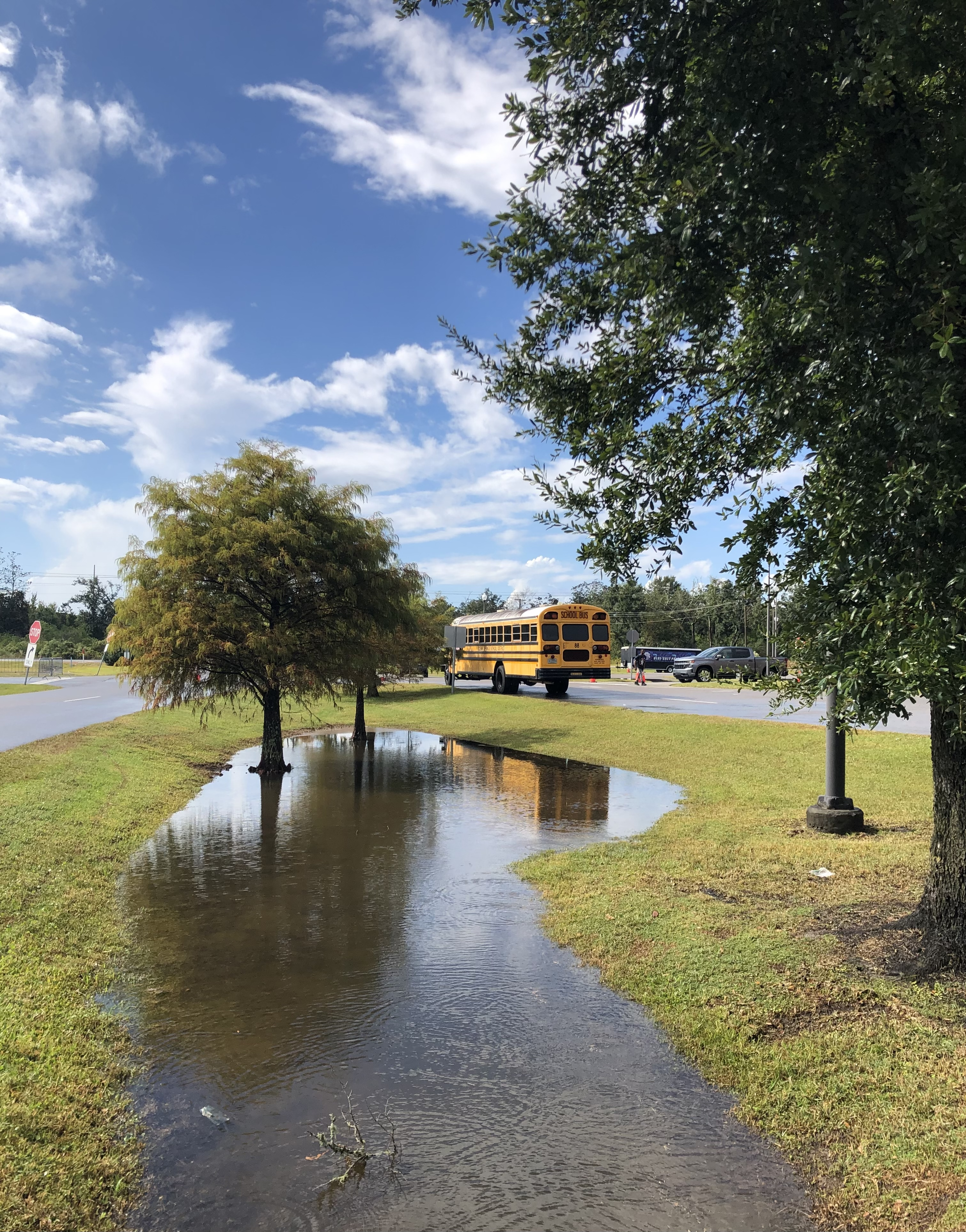
School bus at Ocean Springs High School

In addition to Ocean Springs it serves Gulf Park Estates and a portion of Gautier.

== Athletics ==
The Ocean Springs High School sports team mascot is the Greyhound. OSHS' sports teams include football, track and field, swimming, cross country, fast and slow pitch softball, soccer, volleyball, basketball, golf, tennis, baseball, and wrestling.

== School Programs ==
- JROTC, a citizenship program with a mission statement "To motivate people to become better citizens"
- The Blue-Grey Pride band

== Notable alumni ==
- DeAndre Brown, NFL wide receiver
- Garrett Crochet, MLB pitcher and 2x All-Star selection
- Richard Dickson, former professional football player, won 2007 BCS national championship with LSU Tigers
- Raul Gonzalez, professional soccer player, played for Puerto Rico national team
- Bray Hubbard, college football safety for the Alabama Crimson Tide
- Irving Spikes, NFL running back
- Nolan Wells, disappeared on Horn Island during a party with several OSHS students and graduates. His body was discovered several days later in the water.
