= Adrien Moreau =

French painter

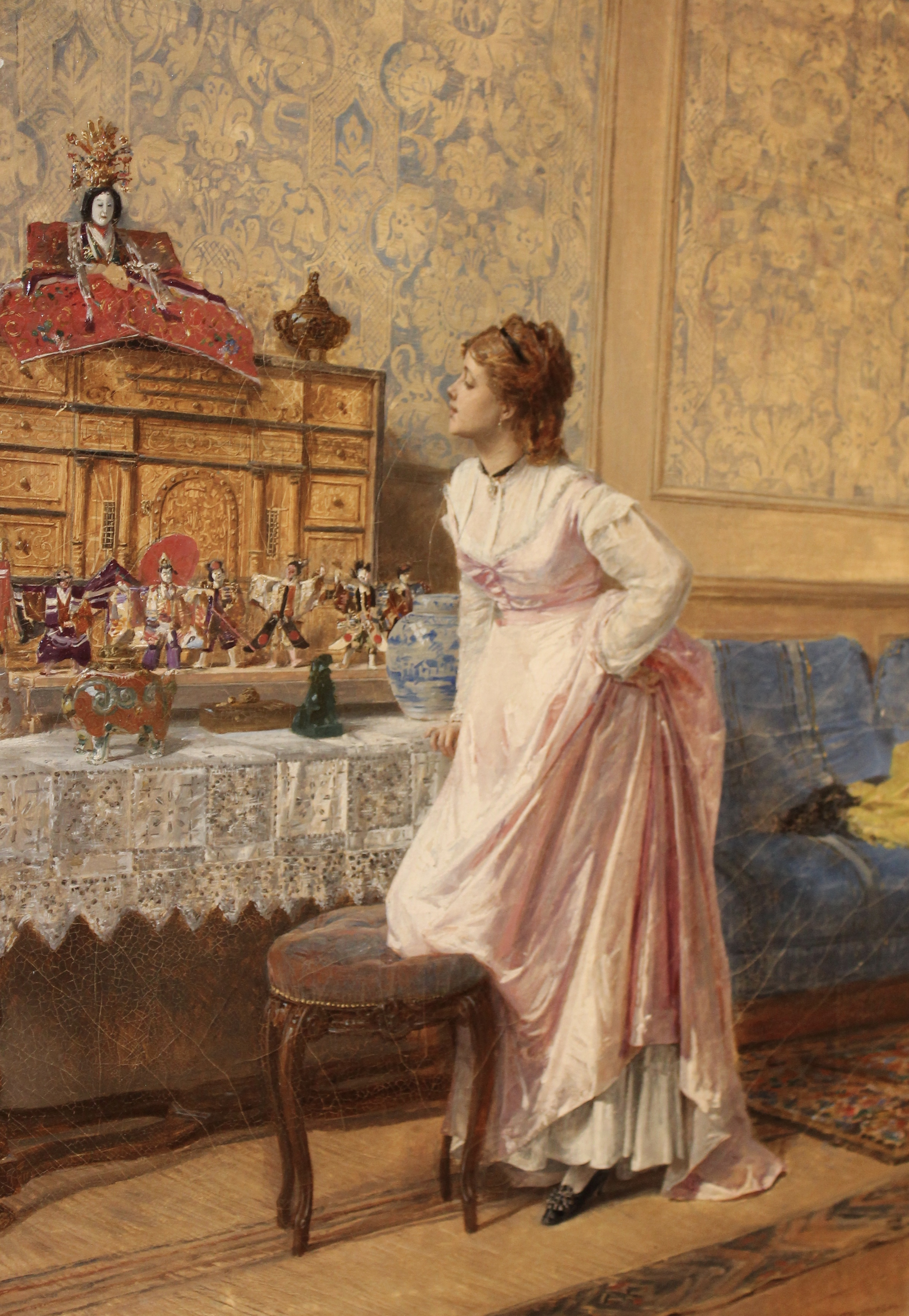
Her Japanese Dolls (1872)

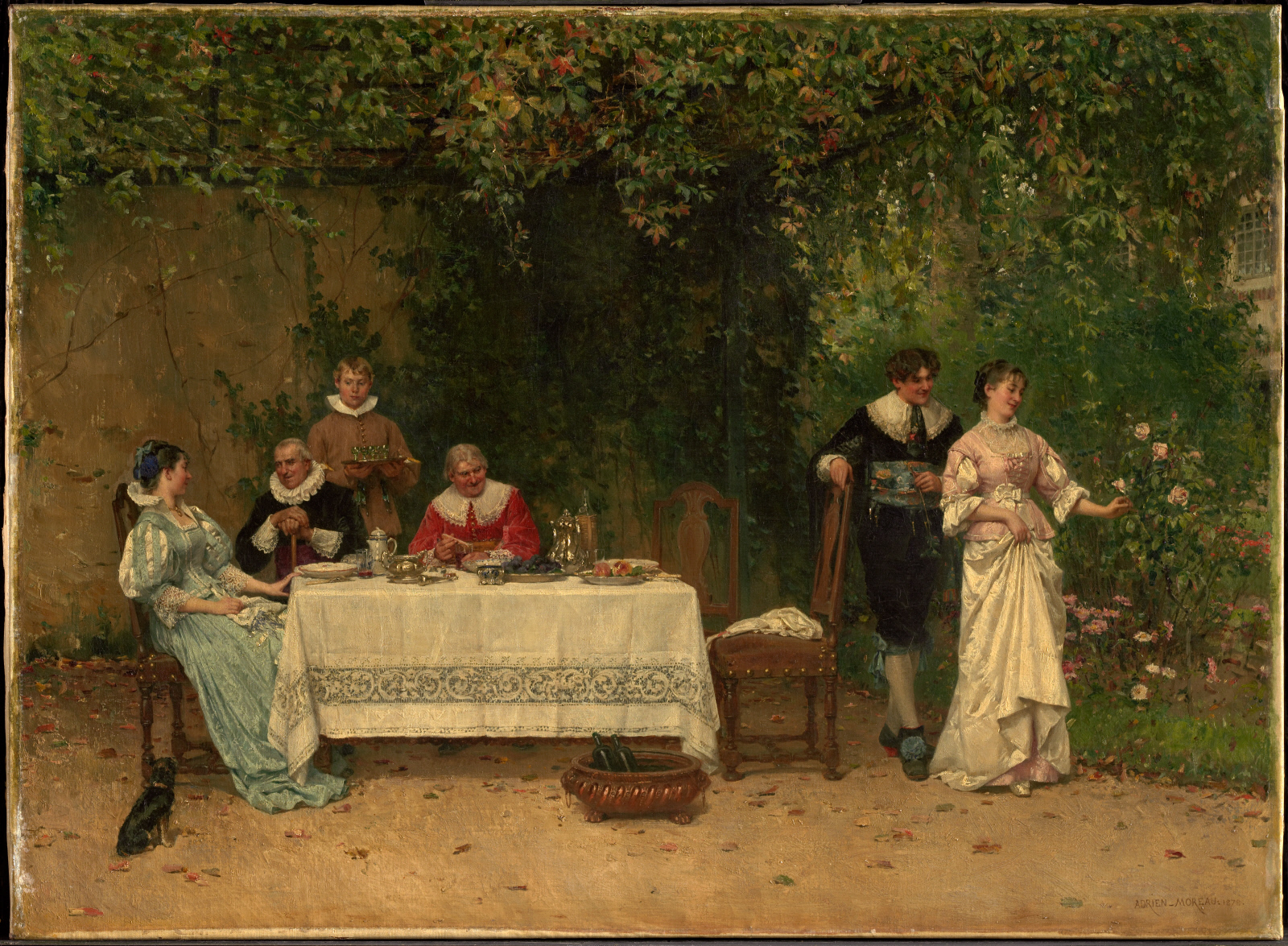
The Proposal, 1878, oil on canvas. Clark Art Institute, Williamstown, Massachusetts

Adrien Nicolas Moreau (18 April 1843 – 22 February 1906) was a French genre and historical painter, sculptor and illustrator.

Moreau was born on 18 April 1843 in Troyes in Aube department. He was the son of Adolphe Augustin Moreau, a stove maker, and Adrienne Leautey. He began his artistic training as an apprentice glassmaker, but left for Paris in 1863 to study at the École des Beaux-Arts under Léon Cogniet and Isidore Pils. He first exhibited at the Paris Salon of 1868, being described by fellow artist and critic, Joseph Uzanne, as "among the ranks of the greatest painters of contemporary genre". After a break occasioned by the Franco-Prussian War, it was his 1873 work, "Concert d’Amateurs dans un Atelier d’Artiste" which really established him in the public eye, and his art became in great demand, particularly in America.

He continued to exhibit at the salon until the end of his life, being awarded a silver medal in 1876 for "Repose at the farm". He also won silver medals at the 1889 and 1900 Exposition Universelle in Paris. Moreau became a Chevalier of the Légion d'honneur in 1892.

Moreau painted in oil (including Grisaille) and watercolour, and during his life became well known for his historical depictions of the French upper classes in past centuries, though he was equally at home in genre landscape paintings featuring peasants and their everyday life. He provided watercolor illustrations and drawings for books by authors such as Voltaire, Victor Hugo, Alphonse Daudet and Honoré de Balzac. He also wrote a book on the history of his family called "Les Moreau" (1893).

He died in Paris in 1906. Most of his paintings were purchased by French museums and foreign collectors in the 19th and 20th centuries. His work is represented in museums in Carcassonne, Nantes and Troyes. Part of his workshop was destroyed during a fire in 1871 following the explosion of the powder magazine in the Luxembourg Garden. A large number of drawings, sketches and studies were lost on this occasion. In 1996, his work "Gypsy dancer" sold for over 260,000 Euros at auction, while, in America, in April 2010, "Concert d'amateurs dans un atelier d'artiste" realised over $70,000.

== External links and references ==
- 19th-Century French Oil Painting Emerges After 130 Years, Sells Immediately Amid Genre's Hot Demand
- Moreau biography (Rehs Gallery inc.)
- Moreau biography (FADA)
- The Archer of Charles IX (Grisaille painting)
