= Erwin Sick =

German inventor

Erwin Sick (3 November 1909 – 3 December 1988) was a German inventor and entrepreneur who was born in Heilbronn.

== Life and career ==
Erwin Sick began his professional career in 1924 with an apprenticeship in optometry and then attended the College of Optics and Precision Mechanics in Göttingen. In 1932 he got a job at Siemens & Halske, where he initially worked in the computer lab. From 1934 to 1939 Erwin Sick held various positions at Siemens, Bosch and Askania Werke AG initially as a designer and later as an engineer. There he was involved in development projects on color film, cinema technology, astronomical and physical devices.

In 1939 he became head of the Laboratory of Optical Works A&C Steinheil & Söhne, Munich. In 1945 he quit the job and ventured into self-employment. Because he was politically unencumbered, Erwin Sick received his license to "Practice his profession as an engineer" on 26 September 1946 by the American military government. That was the birth of the company that later became known as Sick AG.

In June 1951 "German Inventors and Innovations Fair" was held in Munich where Sick presented his first finished wooden model of a photoelectric sensor and received a certificate "for creative performance". The successful patent application of the invented photoelectric sensors and autocollimation on 20 October was a breakthrough in technical devices and lead to the development of an entire equipment program.

In 1972 Sick patented the light curtain, a factory safety device.

Sick died on 3 December 1988 of a heart attack.

== Honors and awards ==
- In 1971, Erwin Sick received Federal Cross of Merit 1st Class at the 25th anniversary of Sick AG.
- In 1980, the Department of Mechanical Engineering of the Technical University of Munich awarded Erwin Sick an honorary Doctor of Engineering in recognition of his contribution "to scientific and constructive development of optical devices with electronic signal evaluation".
- In 1982, he was awarded the Rudolf-Diesel-Medaille "for his numerous inventions in optoelectronics".

== Literature ==
- Anita Kuisle (2010). "Sick, Erwin Karl". Neue Deutsche Biographie (in German). Vol. 24. Berlin: Duncker & Humblot. pp. 308–309. (full text online).
