= Pilz =

Pilz, Piltz
Origin
- Language: German
- Meaning: mushroom
- Region of origin: Germany, Poland, Austria

Other names
- Variant forms: Pilc (Slavic), Pilzer; Pils, Pelz (Peltz), Pels

Pilz is a German occupational surname, which means a gatherer of mushrooms, derived from the German Pilz "mushroom". Variants of the name include Piltz and Pilzer. The name may refer to:

- Adolf Piltz (1855–1940), German mathematician
- Anders Piltz (born 1943), Swedish scholar
- Andrea Pilzer (born 1991), Italian curler
- Christiane Pilz (born 1975), German athlete
- Gerhard Pilz (born 1965), Austrian luger
- Günter Pilz (born 1945), Austrian mathematician
- Hans-Uwe Pilz (born 1958), German footballer
- Jessica Pilz (born 1996), Austrian sport climber
- Karol Piltz (1903–1939), Polish chess player
- Michel Pilz (1945–2023), German bass clarinetist
- Otto Piltz (1846–1910), German painter
- Paul Zane Pilzer (born 1954), American economist
- Peter Pilz (born 1954), Austrian politician
- Rick S. Piltz (1943–2014), American policy analyst
- Wendy Piltz (born 1956), Australian athlete
