= Ludovic Piette =

French painter (1826–1878)

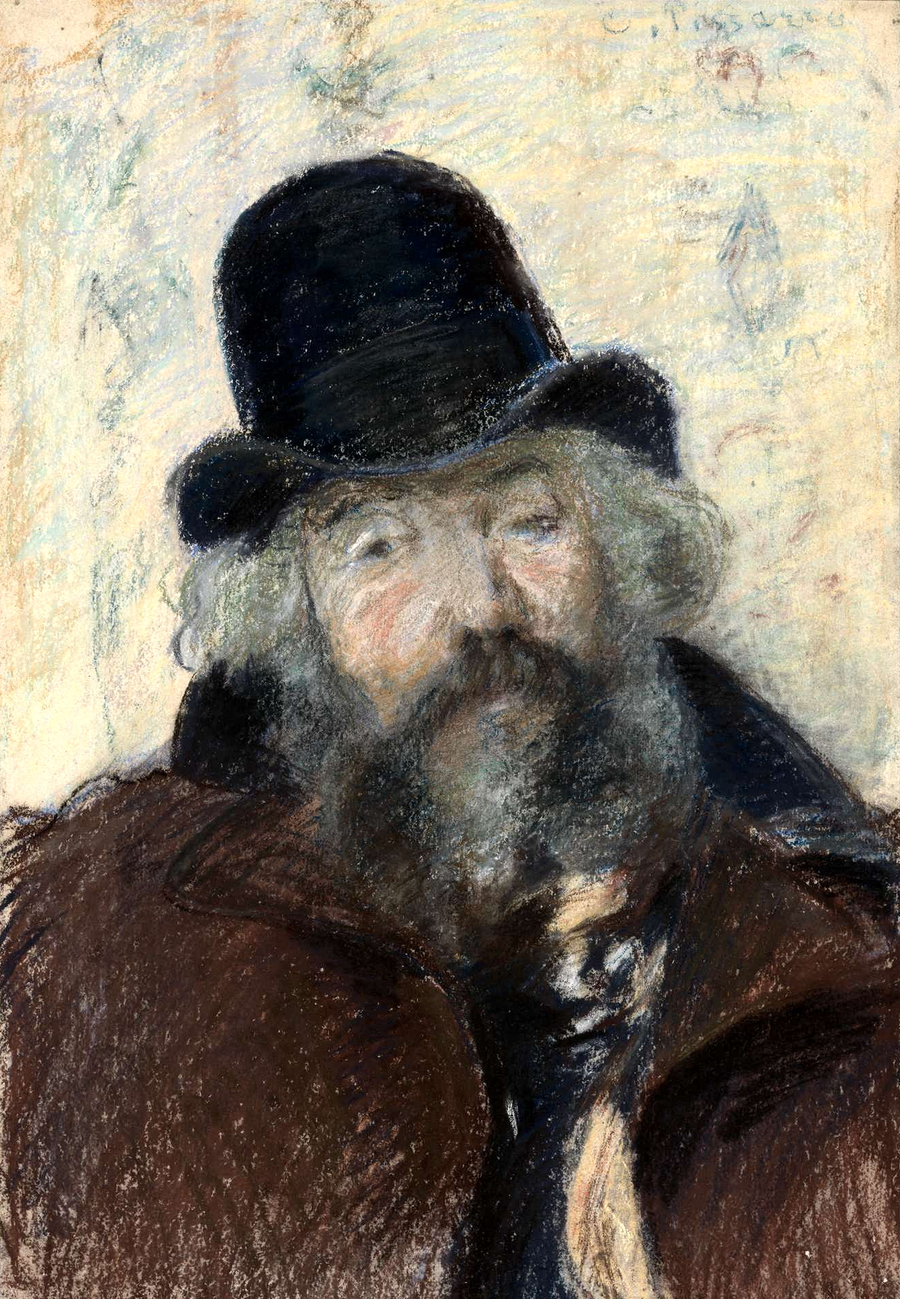
- Ludovic Piette; portrait by Camille Pissarro (c.1875)
- Born: 11 May 1826; Niort
- Died: 14 April 1878 (aged 51)
- Occupation: Painter

Ludovic Piette-Montfoucault (11 May 1826, Niort – 14 April 1878, Paris) was a French Impressionist painter.

== Biography ==
Piette came from a family of the minor nobility, and his father was the Registrar of Melleray. His first art lessons came from the Academic painters Thomas Couture and Isidore Pils. It was while studying with Couture that he met Édouard Manet, who was already experimenting with new styles. Then, while at the Académie Suisse, he became good friends with Camille Pissarro who, although younger than him, would have a decisive influence on Piette's work. He and other friends of Pissarro would often paint together, en plein-air. In 1857, he had his first show at the Salon. He is said to have received a commission from Napoleon III to provide decorations for the apartments of Empress Eugénie, but there is no official record of this.

In 1864, because of poor health (possibly cancer), he and his wife settled at his family's farm, which he had inherited after his father's death, near Lassay-les-Châteaux in Brittany. At that time, he began writing regularly to Pissarro, whose correspondence is an important record of the formative years of Impressionism, a period with little other documentation. While there, he served on the Municipal council as part of the Liberal Conservative faction.

As with many Impressionists, he tended to focus on landscapes with figures and cityscapes. Among his favorite areas for painting were Pontoise and Louveciennes. In 1877, at Pissarro's invitation, he participated in the third Impressionist Exhibition. After his death, a retrospective of his work was presented at the fourth Exhibition in 1879. A street in Pontoise is named in his honor.

== Selected paintings ==
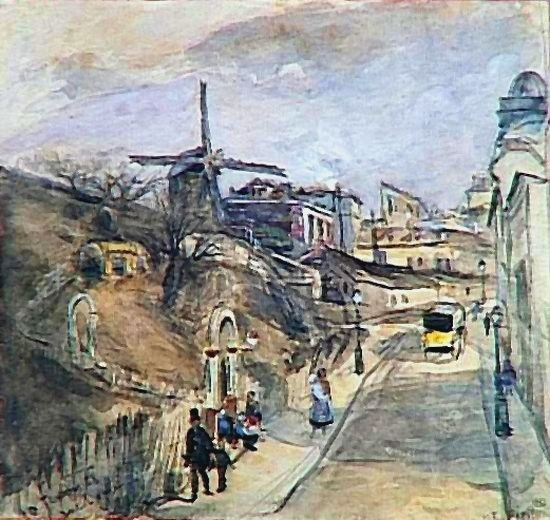
Moulin de la Galette (1860)

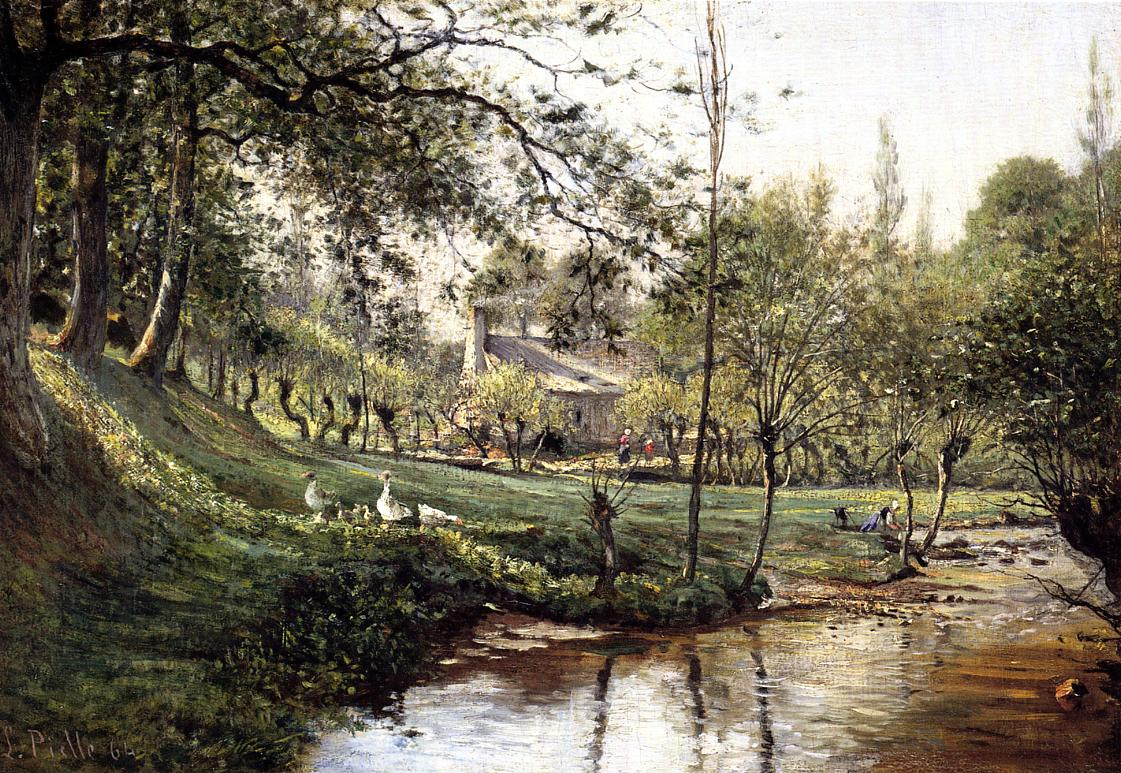
Landscape with Laundress (1864)

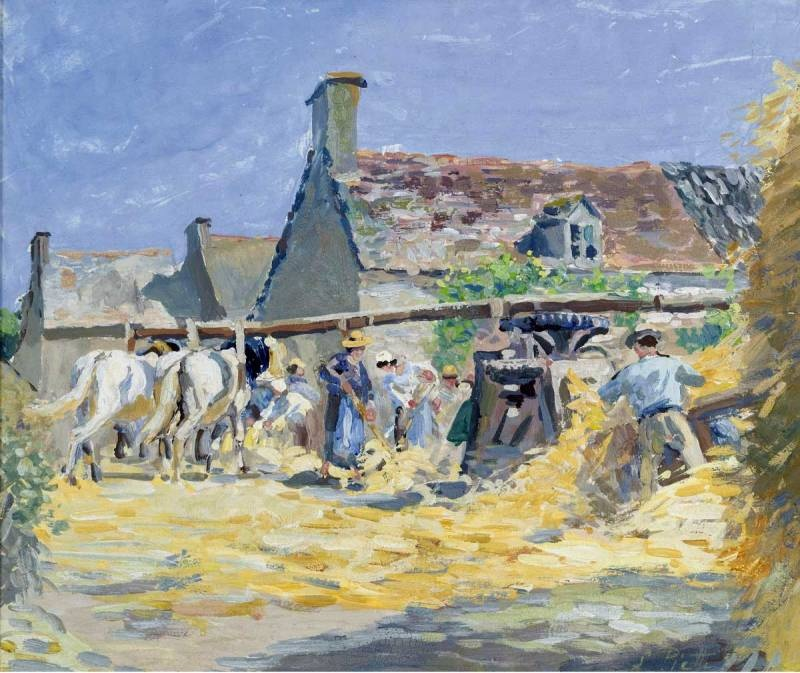
Hay Moving (1876)

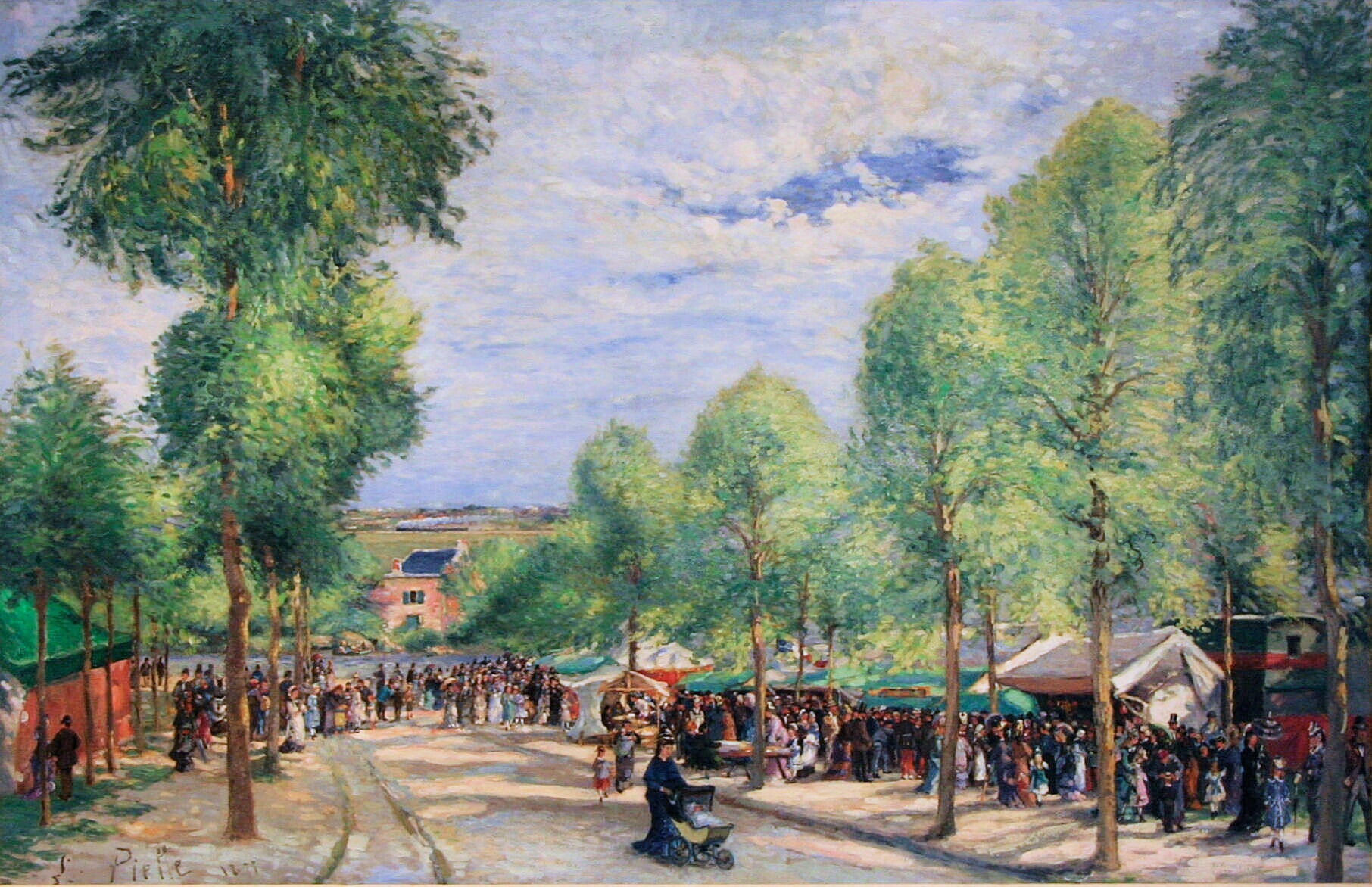
Festival on the Boulevard des Fossés in Pontoise (1877)
