= Garrett Discovery =

American digital forensics company

Garrett Discovery Inc.
- Industry: Digital forensics
- Founded: 2007
- Founder: Andrew Garrett
- Website: GarrettDiscovery.com

Garrett Discovery Inc. is an American digital forensics company founded in 2007. It is best known for analyzing a phone conversation between former Pakistani Chief Justice Mian Saqib Nisar and an unknown person.

== History ==
The company was founded as Technology Consultants of America in 2003 by Andrew Garrett who previously worked at Naval Research Laboratory and Stennis Space Center. In 2007, Garrett renamed the company to Garrett Discovery Inc. and registered it as an Illinois Corporation. A decade later in 2020, the company's headquarters was moved to Orlando, Florida.

In 2021, FactFocus.com hired Garrett Discovery to analyze a phone conversation between former Pakistani Chief Justice Mian Saqib Nisar and an unknown person. After FactFocus published the results of the conversation which Garrett Discovery claimed to be unedited, the company started to receive legal and criminal threats from various people.

The alleged conversation roughly translated into English as quoted by the Pakistani newspaper Dawn:

"Let me be a little blunt about it. Unfortunately, here it is the institutions that dictate judgements. In this case, we will have to punish Mian sahab (Nawaz Sharif). [I] have been told 'we have to bring Khan sahab (Imran Khan) [into power].'"

In 2022, Garrett Discovery was involved in American rapper Mystikal's alleged rape case. The company conducted mobile forensics to find relevant data present in the mobile phone and social media. In the same year, it also verified that the viral video of Elon Musk firing Vijaya Gadde of Twitter on AIR was fabricated and made up of several of Musk's clips.
