= Ocean Springs School District =

School District in Mississippi, United States

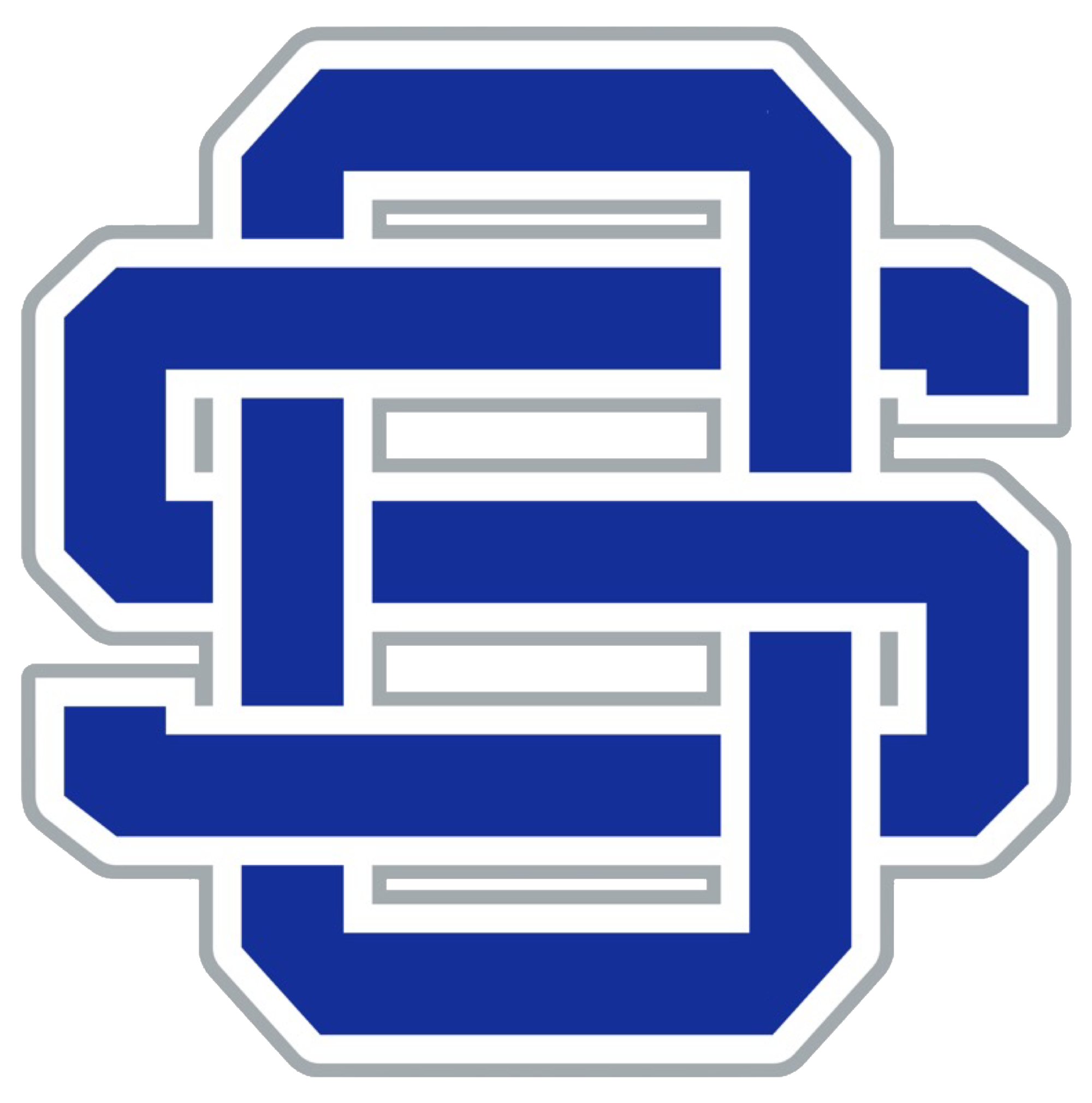

Address
- 2300 Government Street Ocean Springs, Mississippi, 39564; United States
- Coordinates: 30.413109°N 88.809701°W

District information
- Type: Public
- Motto: Academics. Arts. Athletics.
- Grades: Pre K–12
- Established: 1927; 99 years ago
- Superintendent: Michael Lindsey

Students and staff
- Students: 6,000
- Faculty: 700
- District mascot: Greyhounds
- Colors: Royal Blue, Grey, White

Other information
- Website: www.ossdms.org

The Ocean Springs School District is a public school district based in Ocean Springs, Mississippi (USA). The Mississippi Department of Education ranked it as the #1 performing district in the state of Mississippi for the 2022-2023 and 2023-2024 school years.

In addition to Ocean Springs, the district also serves the Gulf Park Estates community and a small section of Gautier.

== Schools ==
=== High School (Grades 9-12) ===
- Ocean Springs High School

=== Middle School (Grades 7-8) ===
- Ocean Springs Middle School

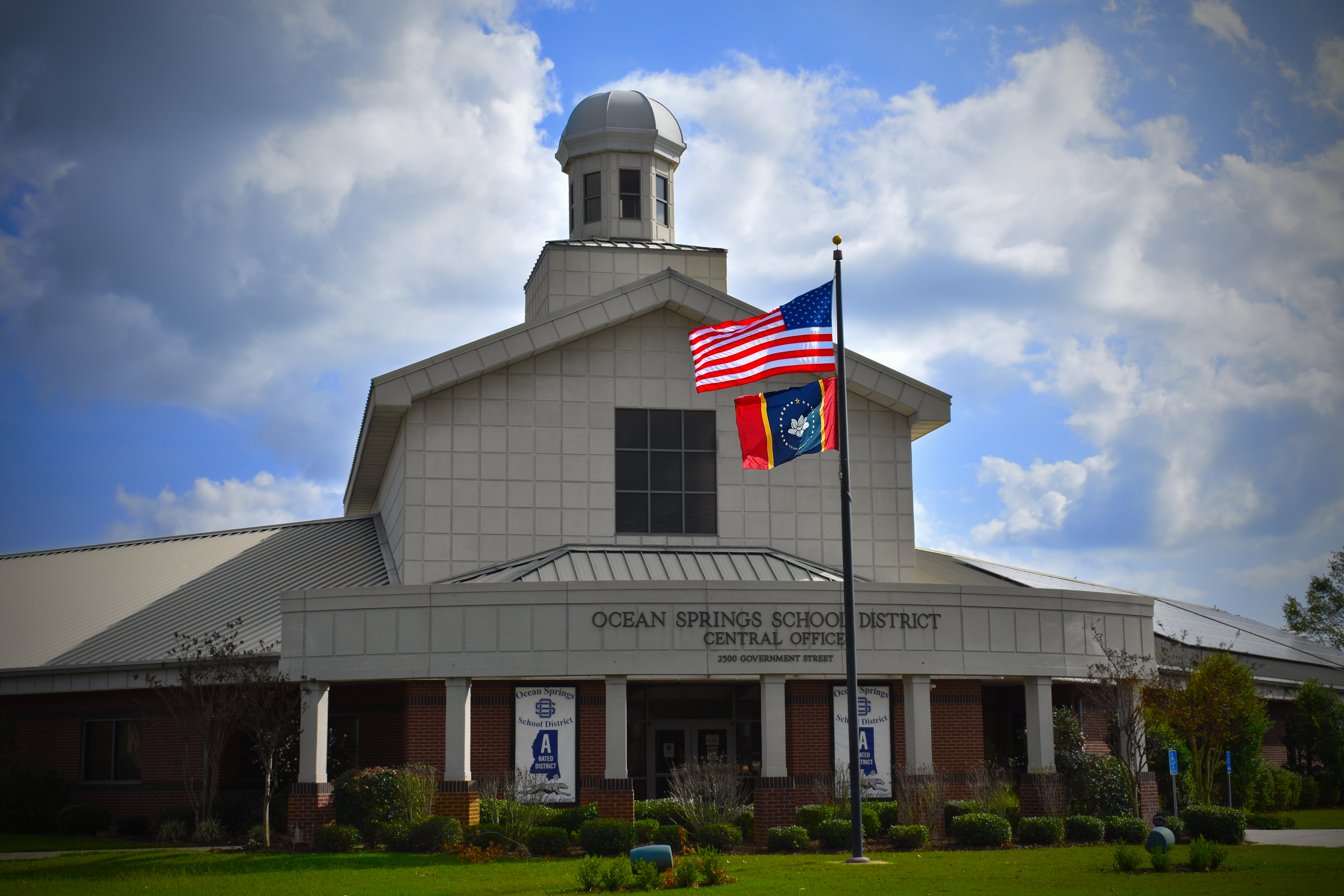
OSSD Central Office in Ocean Springs, Mississippi.

=== Upper Elementary School (Grades 5-6) ===
- Ocean Springs Upper Elementary

=== Elementary Schools (Grades PreK-4) ===
- Magnolia Park Elementary (Grades K-4)
- Oak Park Elementary (Grades PreK-4)
- Pecan Park Elementary (Grades K-4)

=== District Campuses ===
- Ocean Springs Career and Technical Education Center (On High School Campus)
- Elizabeth H. Keys Alternative Education Center

== Demographics ==
=== 2019-20 school year ===
There were a total of 6,036 students enrolled in the Ocean Springs School District during the 2019–2020 school year.

=== Previous school years ===
School Year	Enrollment	Gender Makeup		Racial Makeup				
School Year	Enrollment	Female	Male	Asian	African American	Hispanic	Native American	White
2005-06	4,737	50%	50%	3.82%	9.73%	2.45%	0.36%	83.64%
2004-05	5,418	49%	51%	3.34%	9.86%	2.33%	0.35%	84.13%
2003-04	5,252	49%	51%	3.07%	9.08%	1.96%	0.19%	85.70%
2002-03	5,061	48%	52%	3.12%	8.16%	1.70%	0.18%	86.84%

== Accountability statistics ==
	2006-07	2005-06	2004-05	2003-04	2002-03
District Accreditation Status	Accredited	Accredited	Accredited	Accredited	Accredited
School Performance Classifications
Level 5 (Superior Performing) Schools	5	6	6	6	5
Level 4 (Exemplary) Schools	1	0	0	0	1
Level 3 (Successful) Schools	0	0	0	0	0
Level 2 (Under Performing) Schools	0	0	0	0	0
Level 1 (Low Performing) Schools	0	0	0	0	0
Not Assigned	0	0	0	0	0

== See also ==
- List of school districts in Mississippi
