= Pelz =

Pelz is a surname. It may refer to:

- Bruce Pelz (1936–2002), American science fiction fan
- Dave Pelz, American golf coach
- Dwight Pelz (born 1951), American politician who served as the Chair of the Washington State Democratic Party
- Josef Pelz von Felinau (1895–1978), Austrian writer
- Paul J. Pelz (1841–1918), German-American architect

== See also ==
- Pelze, a short river of Saxony-Anhalt, Germany
