= Safety relay =

Safety equipment

Safety relays are devices that generally implement safety functions.

== History ==
Relays and contactors were used to control plant and machinery in the early days of control technology. In the event of a hazardous situation, the actuator was simply isolated from the energy supply. This type of protection system could be manipulated in the event of a malfunction, disabling the protective function. Special relay circuits, such as the three-contactor combination, were the first designs to come out of deliberations into how this could be avoided. These device combinations led to the development of the first safety relay from the German automation manufacturer Pilz, the PNOZ.

== Description ==
In the event of a hazard, the task of safety functions (e.g. E-STOP, safety gate or standstill monitoring) is to use appropriate measures to reduce the existing risk to an acceptable level. These many safety functions include:

- Emergency stop pushbuttons
- Safety gates
- Light beam devices
- Pressure sensitive mats
- Two-hand controls
- Time delay

As such, safety relays monitor a specific function. When connected to other safety relays, they guarantee full monitoring of a plant or machine. They meet the requirements of EN 60947-5-1, EN 60204-1 and VDE 0113-1. Furthermore, there are many variants of safety relays, which are suitable for various machinery applications. Time Delay Safety Relays allow for a controlled sequence of operations before activating or deactivating outputs. This is useful when an immediate shutdown could cause damage or additional hazards. Undervoltage relays, provides protection for sensitive systems by detecting undervoltage conditions. It is essential for ensuring smooth operation in environments with fluctuating power supplies.

== Design and function ==
The design technology is the main difference between the safety relays:

- Classic contact-based relay technology "force-guided contacts relay"
- With electronic evaluation and contact-based volt-free outputs
- Fully electronic devices with semiconductor outputs

Safety relays must always be designed in such a way that, if wired correctly, neither a fault in the device nor an external fault caused by the sensor or actuator will lead to the loss of the safety function.

A normal relay uses a wire coil and the mechanical movement of the metal contacts to switch the load on and off. The metal contacts may weld shut after repeated operation cycles. If this happens, the machine would continue running if the operator pressed the emergency stop pushbutton. This would be hazardous for the operator. For this reason, many European, American, national and international norms and safety standards prohibit the use of simple relays or contactors on hazardous machines.

The typical design of a first-generation safety relay is based on the classic three-contactor combination. The redundant design ensures that wiring errors do not lead to the loss of the safety function. Two relays (K1, K2) with positive-guided contacts provide the safe switching contacts. The two input circuits CH1 and CH2 each activate one of the two internal relays. The circuit is activated via the start relay K3. There is another monitoring circuit between the connection points Y1 and Y2 (feedback loop). This connection is used to check and monitor the position of actuators, which are activated or shut down via the safety contacts. The device is designed in such a way that any faults in the input circuit are detected, e.g. contact welding on an emergency off/emergency stop pushbutton or on one of the safety contacts on the output relay. The safety device stops the device switching back on and thereby stops the activation of relays K1 and K2.
