= Isidore Pils =

French painter

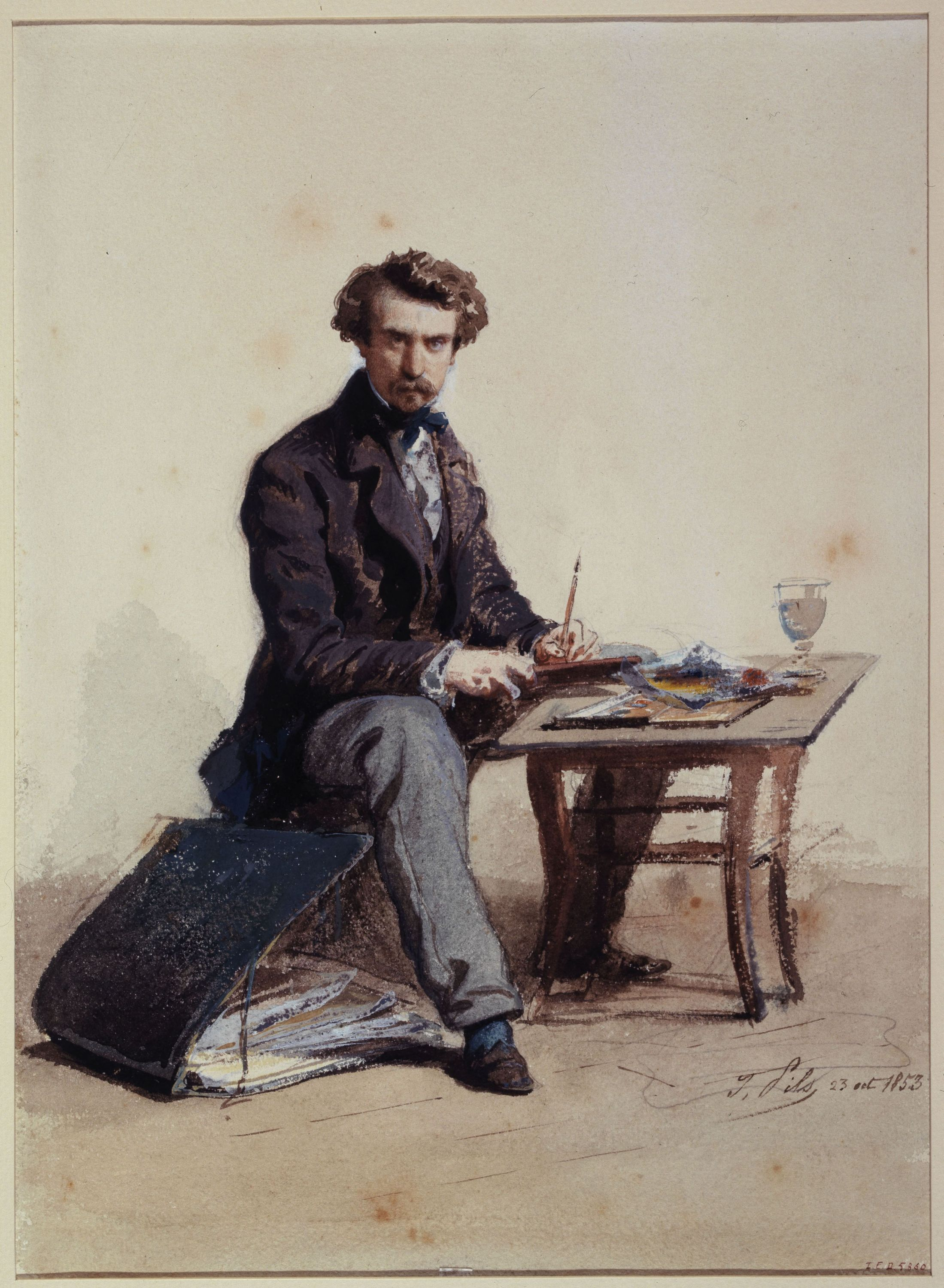
Portrait of the artist, self portrait, 1853

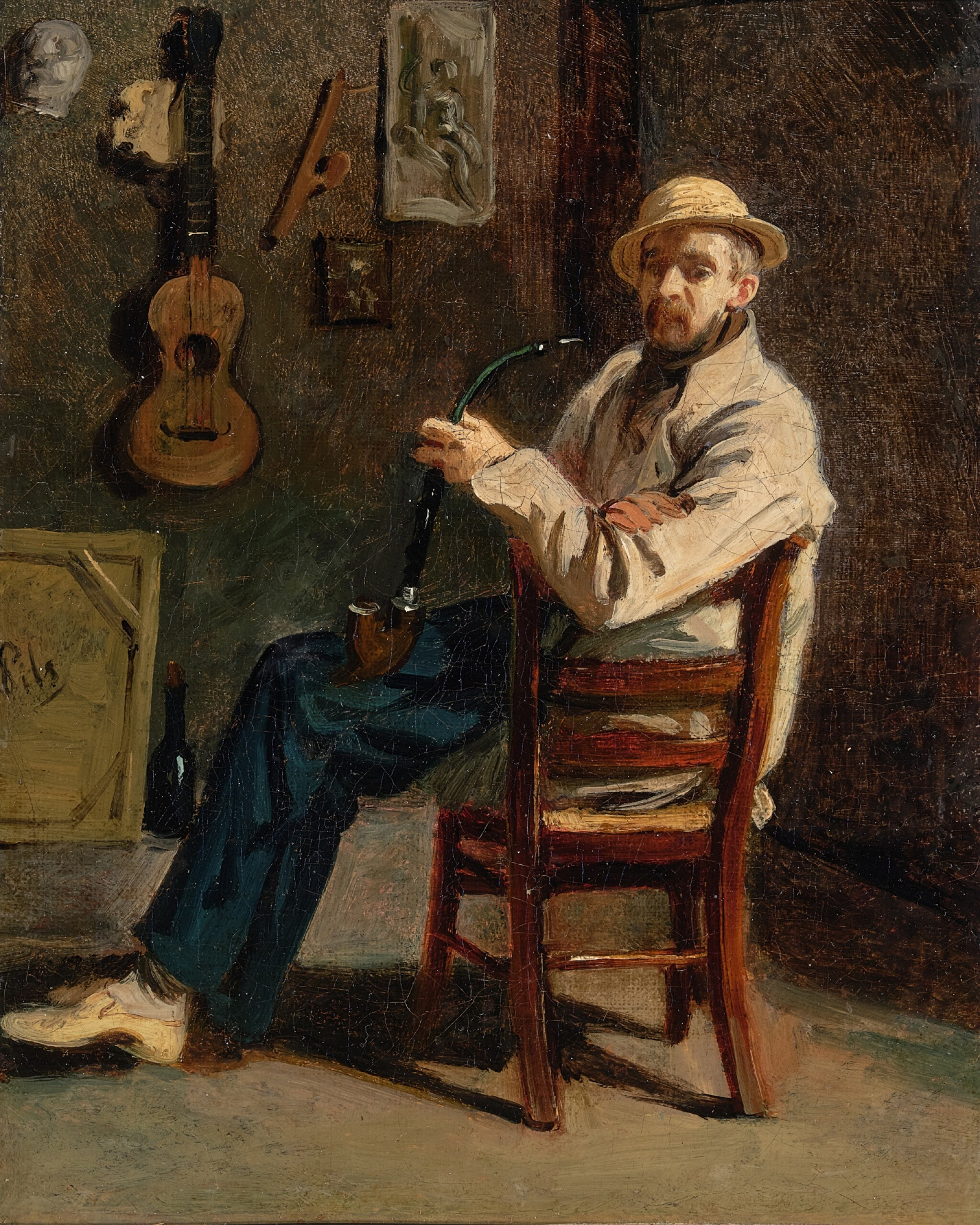
Isidore Pils late self-portrait

Isidore-Alexandre-Augustin Pils (1815–1875) was a French academic painter of religious and military subjects.

== Biography ==
Pils was born in Paris as the son of a soldier François Pils. At the age of twelve, he studied with Guillaume Guillon-Lethière for four years.

In 1831 he became a student at the École des Beaux-Arts and studied under François-Édouard Picot. He competed for the Prix de Rome, which he won in 1838 for a history painting, St. Peter Healing a Lame Man at the Door of the Temple. Although in poor health, Pils then spent the customary three years at the French Academy in Rome at the Villa Medici, which then had Jean Auguste Dominique Ingres as its director. While in Italy he visited Naples, Venice, and Florence.

Pils's earlier paintings have religious themes. In 1849 he completed his most famous work, Rouget de L'Isle Singing La Marseillaise, which now resides at the Musée historique de Strasbourg. After experiences travelling with French troops through the Crimea, his themes took on military and nationalistic subjects. He later produced many military scenes during the siege of Paris during the Franco-Prussian War of 1870.

Pils was appointed professor of painting at the École des Beaux-Arts in 1863 but left the same year for two years in Algeria. In 1868 he was elected to seat #14 of the Académie des Beaux-Arts. Among his students were Adrien Moreau, Paul Adolphe Rajon, Julien Dupré, Luc-Olivier Merson, Ludovic Piette, Édouard Joseph Dantan and László Mednyánszky Henry-Lionel Brioux.

Among his other work, Pils painted part of the ceiling of the grand staircase of the Palais Garnier, in four panels titled The Gods of Olympus, Apollo in His Chariot, Triumph of Harmony, and Apotheosis of the Opera, completed the year of his death. The following year he was the subject of a biography by Louis Becq de Fouquières.

Pils died in Douarnenez and is buried in section 54 of Père Lachaise Cemetery.

== Gallery ==
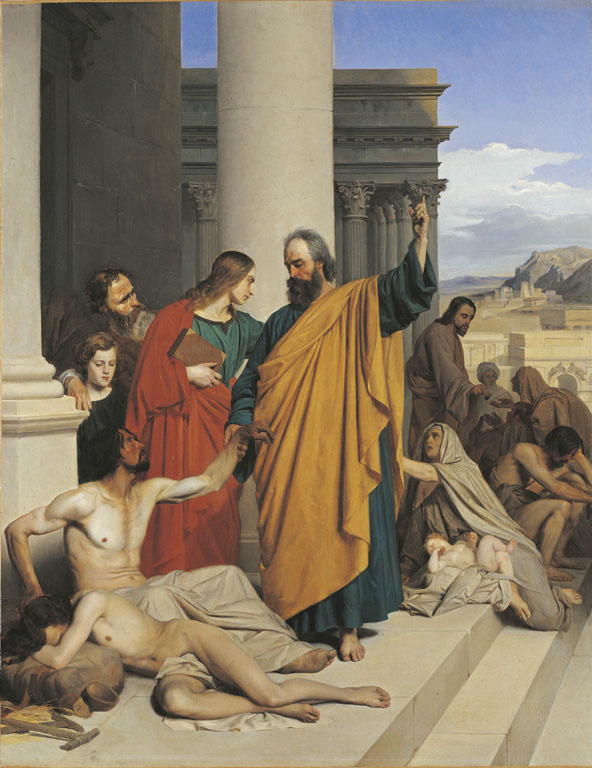
St. Peter Healing a Lame Man at the Door of the Temple, 1838

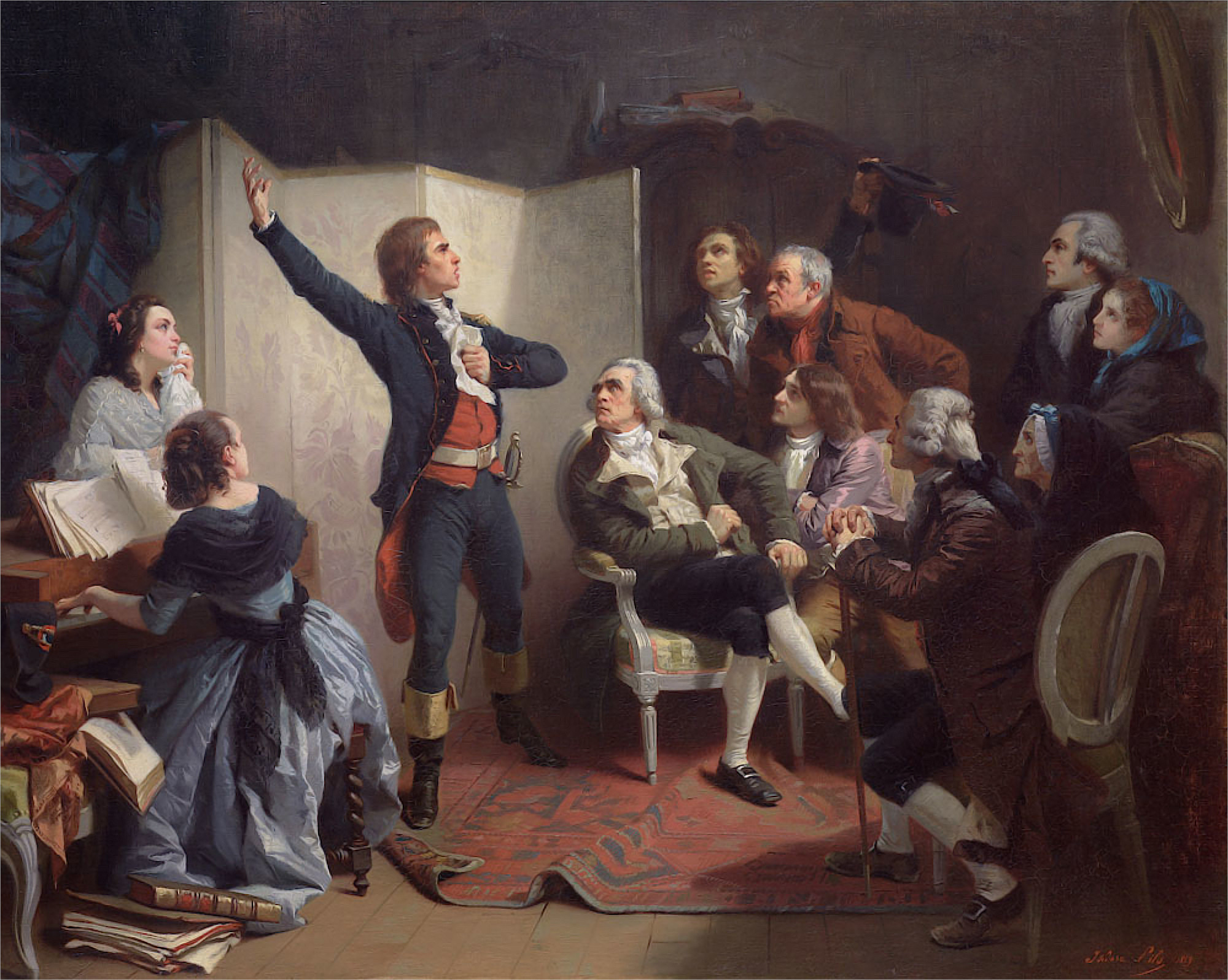
Rouget de L'Isle Singing La Marseillaise, 1849

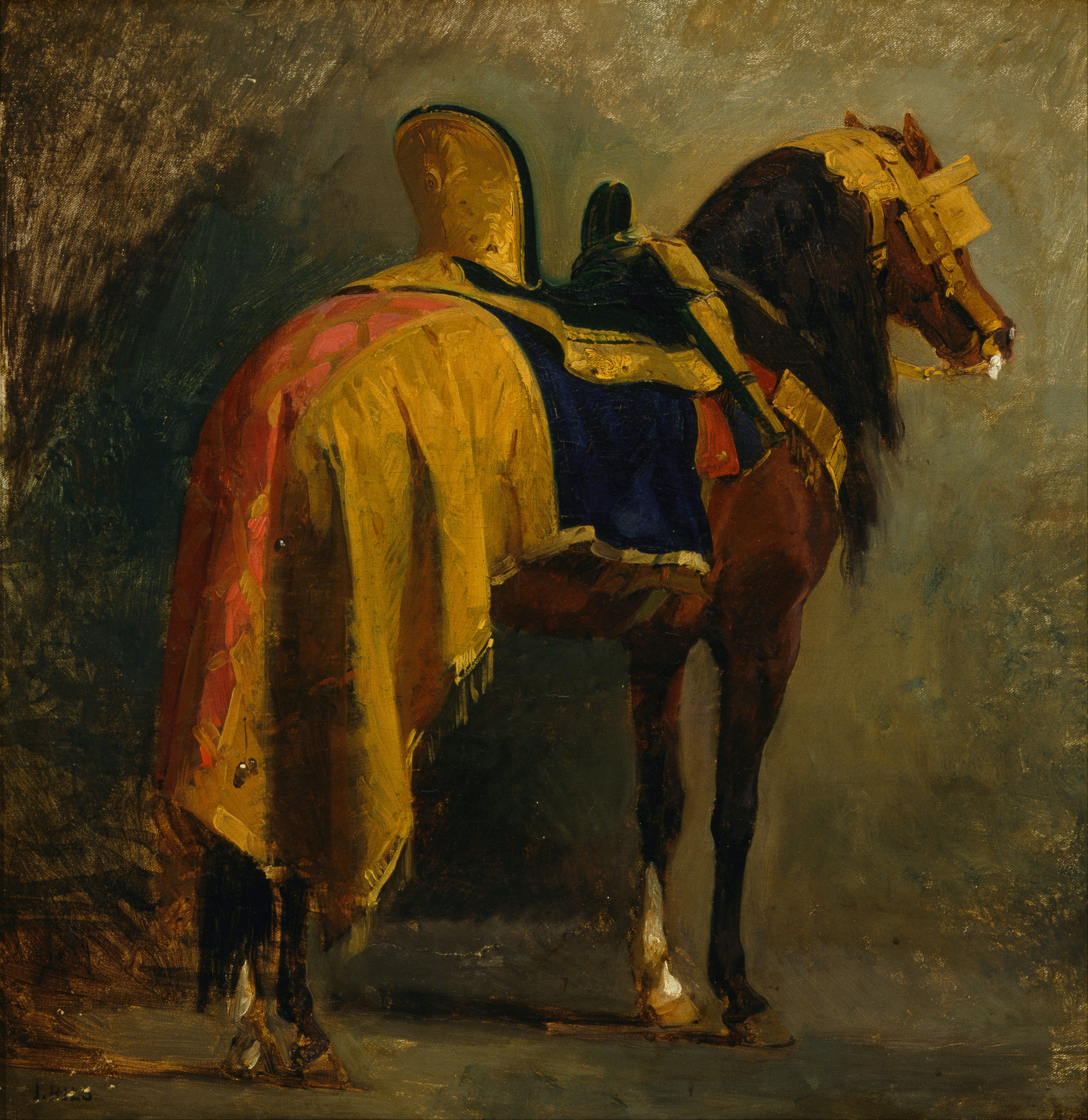
Horse caparisoned, c. 1860, Art Gallery of New South Wales

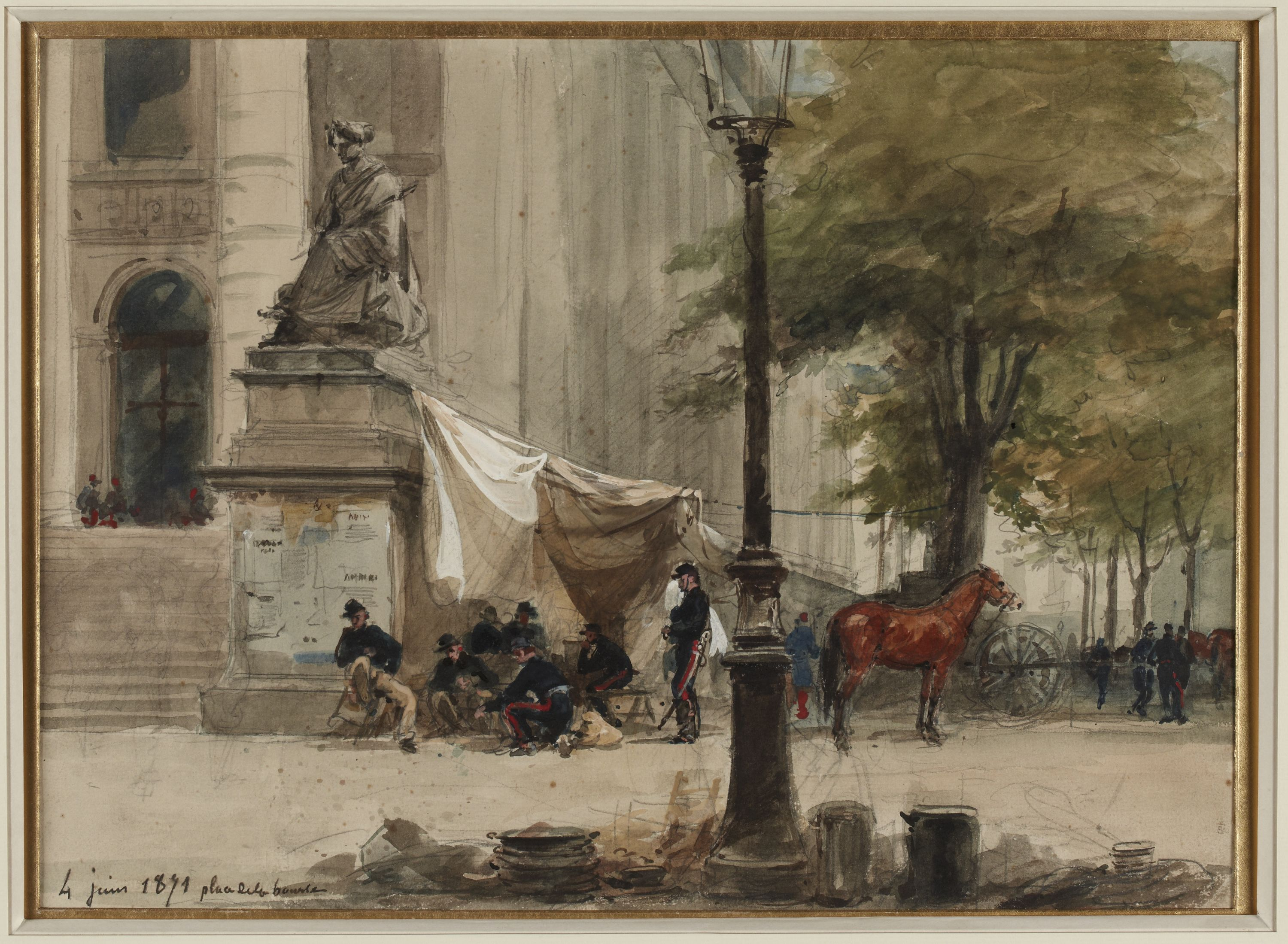
Campement d'artilleurs sur la place de la Bourse, 4 juin 1871

Study of a Reclining Nude 1836

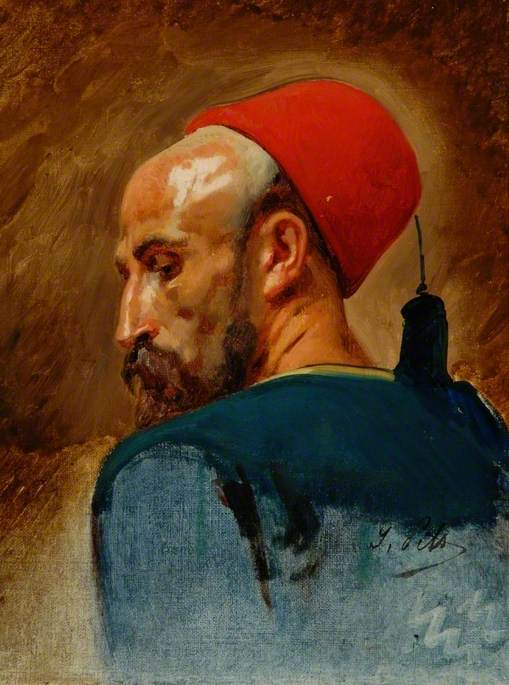
Head of an Arab in a Fez c 1856

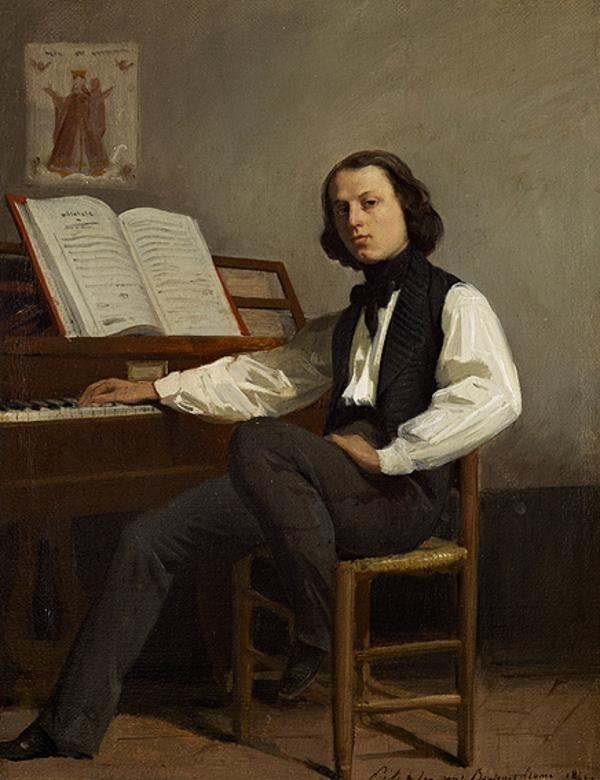
Portrait of Georges Bousquet c 1841-3

== Notes ==
- Some content on this page is translated from its French equivalent. Accessed 3/11/2010
