= François Pils =

French painter

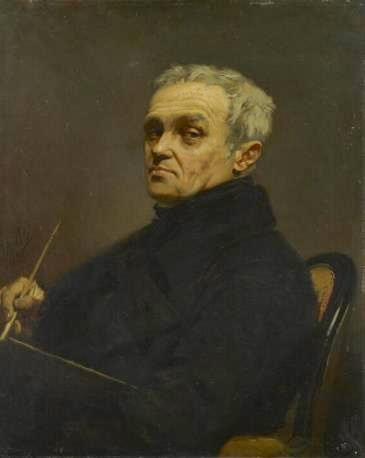
Image of François Pils

François Pils (1785–1867) was a French soldier and painter.

Grenadier Pils served on the staff of Marshal Oudinot as his batman and emergency medic (1804–1814) during which time he made many sketches and drawings of the Napoleonic Wars, especially the War of the Fifth Coalition and the Russian campaign, which form one of the rare contemporary pictures of Napoleonic warfare. Pils’ work was later grouped and published in annotated bookform.

François Pils was the father of French painter Isidore Pils.
