= Sick AG =

German company

SICK AG

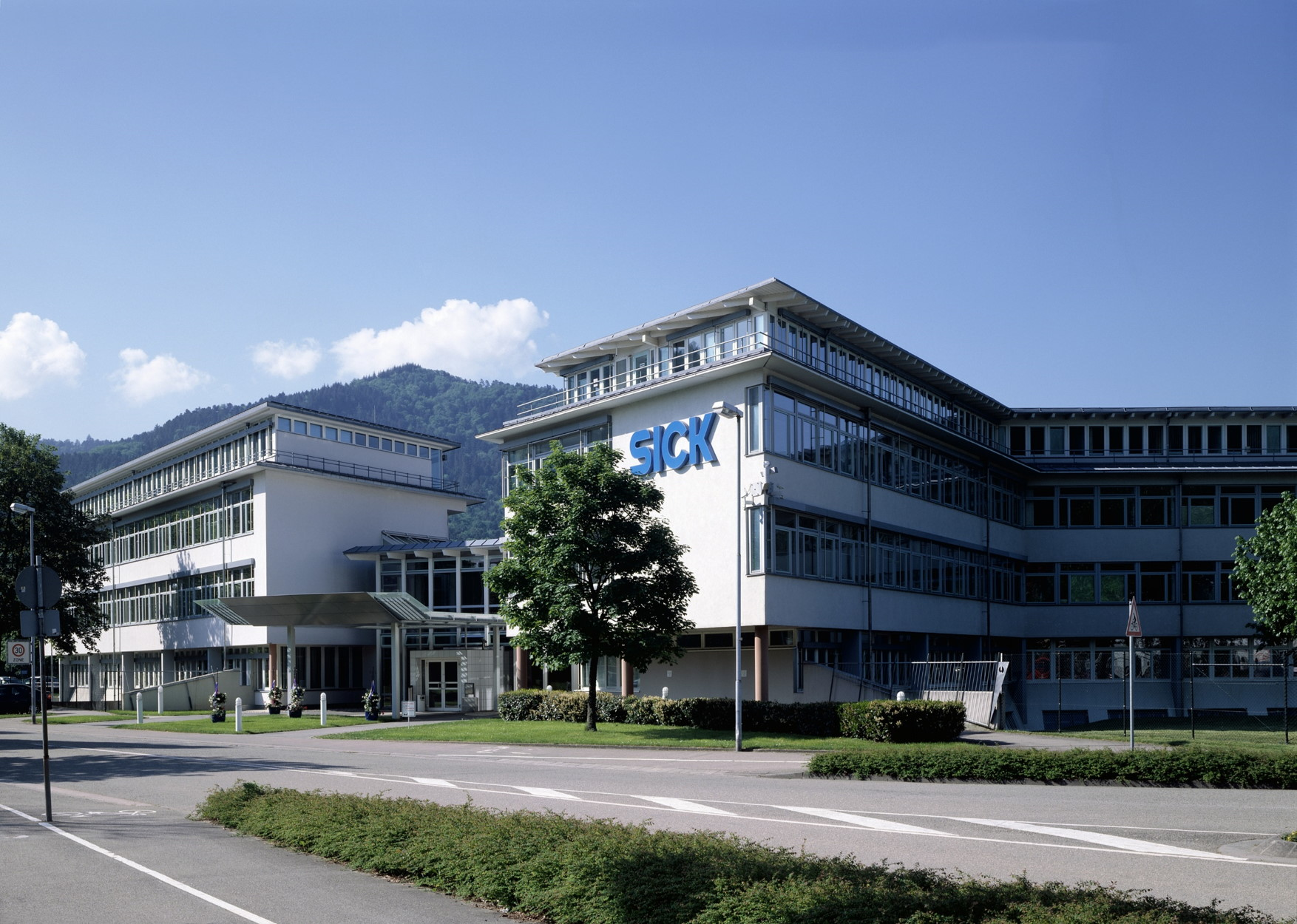
- The headquarters of Sick in Waldkirch
- Company type: Aktiengesellschaft
- Industry: Industrial sensors
- Founded: 1946; 80 years ago
- Headquarters: Waldkirch, Germany
- Revenue: ▲2.1 billion euro (2024)
- Net income: ▲€92 million euro (2024)
- Number of employees: 11,804 (2024)
- Website: www.sick.com

Sick AG (stylized in all capital letters), based in Waldkirch (Breisgau), Germany, is a global manufacturer of sensors and sensor solutions for industrial applications. The company is active in the areas of factory and logistics. The company employs 11,804 employees worldwide and achieved sales of EUR 2.1 billion in 2024.

The company is particularly well known for its laser scanners, which are used as sensors in the fields of facility protection (security), ports, and robotics. Five LIDARs produced by the Sick AG were used for short-range detection on Stanley, the autonomous car that won the 2005 DARPA Grand Challenge; they can be seen on the roof of the vehicle. SICK/IBEO LIDARs were also used for obstacle avoidance, mapping, and pedestrian tracking on WAMbot, the autonomous vehicle that came 4th in the MAGIC 2010 competition. SICK AG has ranked among Germany's best employers for several years.

== History ==
Sick AG was founded in 1946 by Erwin Sick (1909–1988); he had received a license from the then-US-managed local government to operate his engineering firm.

The economic breakthrough came in 1952 with the volume production of the accident-prevention light curtain, presented at the International Machine-Tool Trade Fair in Hanover. In 1956, the company moved from Vaterstetten to Waldkirch (Breisgau). Sick AG has a global presence with 63 subsidiaries and participations, as well as numerous sales agencies. According to the company’s own statements, it invests about 12.2% of its sales revenue in research and development in 2024.

== Products ==
The company’s product portfolio includes photoelectric sensors, light grids, inductive, capacitive and magnetic sensors, opto-electronic protective devices, vision sensors, detection, ranging and identification solutions such as bar code scanners and RFID readers, analyzers for gas and liquid analysis, and gas flow measuring devices.
