= Light curtain =

Opto-electronic safety device

A light curtain. When a beam of infrared light is broken, a safety function is activated.

A light curtain is a safety device that detects when a beam of infrared light has been broken by a person passing through an area.

Light curtains, now more commonly known as Electro-sensitive protective equipment (ESPE), are used to safeguard personnel in the vicinity of moving machinery with the potential to cause harm such as presses, winders and palletisers. Light curtains can be used as an alternative to mechanical barriers and other forms of traditional machine guarding. By reducing the need for physical guards and barriers, light curtains can increase the maintainability of the equipment they are guarding. The operability and efficiency of machinery can also be improved by the use of light curtains by, for example, allowing easier access for semi-automatic procedures.

== History ==
The concept was first introduced as a "light barrier" by German inventor Erwin Sick in 1972 when he formally described this device in a patent application as:

Safety devices acting in conjunction with the control or operation of a machine. Control arrangements requiring the simultaneous use of two or more parts of the body with means, e.g. feelers, which in case of the presence of a body part of a person in or near the danger zone influence the control or operation of the machine the means being photocells or other devices sensitive without mechanical contact using light grids

A year later, he followed up by also applying his patent idea in China, Italy, Japan, United States, Sweden and Great Britain.

This invention substantially lowered the costs of safeguarding personnel without adversely affecting the high requirements of reliability and safety which were until than relied upon such screens. The "Light Barrier" screen was also of compact, neat design and easy to manufacture and introduced the present Light curtain concept of a single energy source in quick temporal succession.

== Description ==
Light curtains fall into a category of equipment known as presence detection devices. Other common presence detection devices are pressure-sensitive safety mats and laser scanners (often used on Remotely Operated Vehicles (ROV) when in industrial settings). Most important applications of safety relays are in automation industries dealing with robotic cell setup.

Light curtains are supplied as a pair with a transmitter and receiver. The transmitter projects an array of parallel infrared light beams to the receiver which consists of a number of photoelectric cells. When an object breaks one or more of the beams a stop signal is sent to the guarded equipment machine.

The light beams emitted from the transmitter are sequenced, one after the other, and pulsed at a specific frequency. The receiver is designed to only accept the specific pulse and frequency from its dedicated transmitter. This enables the rejection of spurious infrared light and thus enhances their suitability as components within a safety system.

Typically, light curtains are connected to a safety relay which will remove motive power from the hazard in the event that an object is detected. Safety relays can be provided with muting functionality which enables the temporary disabling of the safety function to allow objects to pass through the light curtains without tripping the safety relay. This is particularly useful for machinery which has some semi-automatic procedures.

== Types of Light Curtains ==
Type 2 light curtain: These devices must meet SIL1(Safety Integrity Levels) and PLc(Performance levels). They are intended for low risk applications where faults may result in minor injuries. Type 2 light curtains are used in environments where the hazard level is low and where additional safeguarding measures are already in place. These devices have a less fault detection requirements than higher types. Because of this, certain faults may go undetected until a demand is placed on the system. The effective aperture angle (EAA) on these devices must be ±5 degrees or narrower. Because of the wider EEA, proper alignment and installation must be ensured

Type 3 light curtain: These devices must meet SIL 2 and PL d. They must be designed to not fail to danger due to a single fault, but can fail to danger due to an accumulation of faults. These are less commonly used in modern industrial safety systems, as most applications requiring higher protection typically move directly to type 4. While these systems include improved diagnostics compared to type 2, they do not achieve the full redundancy and self monitoring required for the highest safety classifications.

Type 4 light curtain: These devices represent the highest safety classification and require SIL 3 and PLe. They must be designed to not fail to danger due to a single fault or an accumulation of faults. They achieve this through redundant architectures, continuous self checking, and advanced fault detection mechanisms.The EAA of these devices are ±2.5 degrees. This results in tighter optical control, and reduces the likelihood of interference form external light sources, such as reflections and ambient lighting.

== Applications ==
Modern light curtains are widely used in a variety of industrial automation environments to prevent people from entering dangerous areas and reduce the risk of industrial accidents. Common application scenarios include:

Presses and shears: In the metal forming industry, light curtains are used to set up safety barriers in front of the operating area and immediately stop the machine operation when human entry is detected.

Automated packaging lines: Light curtains ensure that operators do not accidentally contact high-speed moving parts during cleaning, line changes or maintenance.

Robotic workstations: In the action area of collaborative robots, light curtains provide flexible safety protection, which can detect the approach of people in a specific area and automatically reduce the speed of the robot or stop it.

Logistics conveyor system: Light curtains are used to detect the passage of objects, trigger sorting or stop conveyor belts, and prevent people from being drawn into the equipment.

Automated assembly lines: Light curtains are often used in links such as the entrance, packaging or welding of dangerous equipment to ensure physical isolation between equipment operation and human activities.

Dimensioning and profiling: Objects that pass through the beam break light streams up to a certain height, this information is used to measure the size of the object.

== Standards ==
The following partial list of standards should be used for guidance when implementing light curtains:

- ANSI B11.19
- IEC61496-1/-2
- IEC/TS 62046;
- ISO13855 (EN 999);
