= Pilz (company) =

German automation technology company

Pilz GmbH & Co. KG
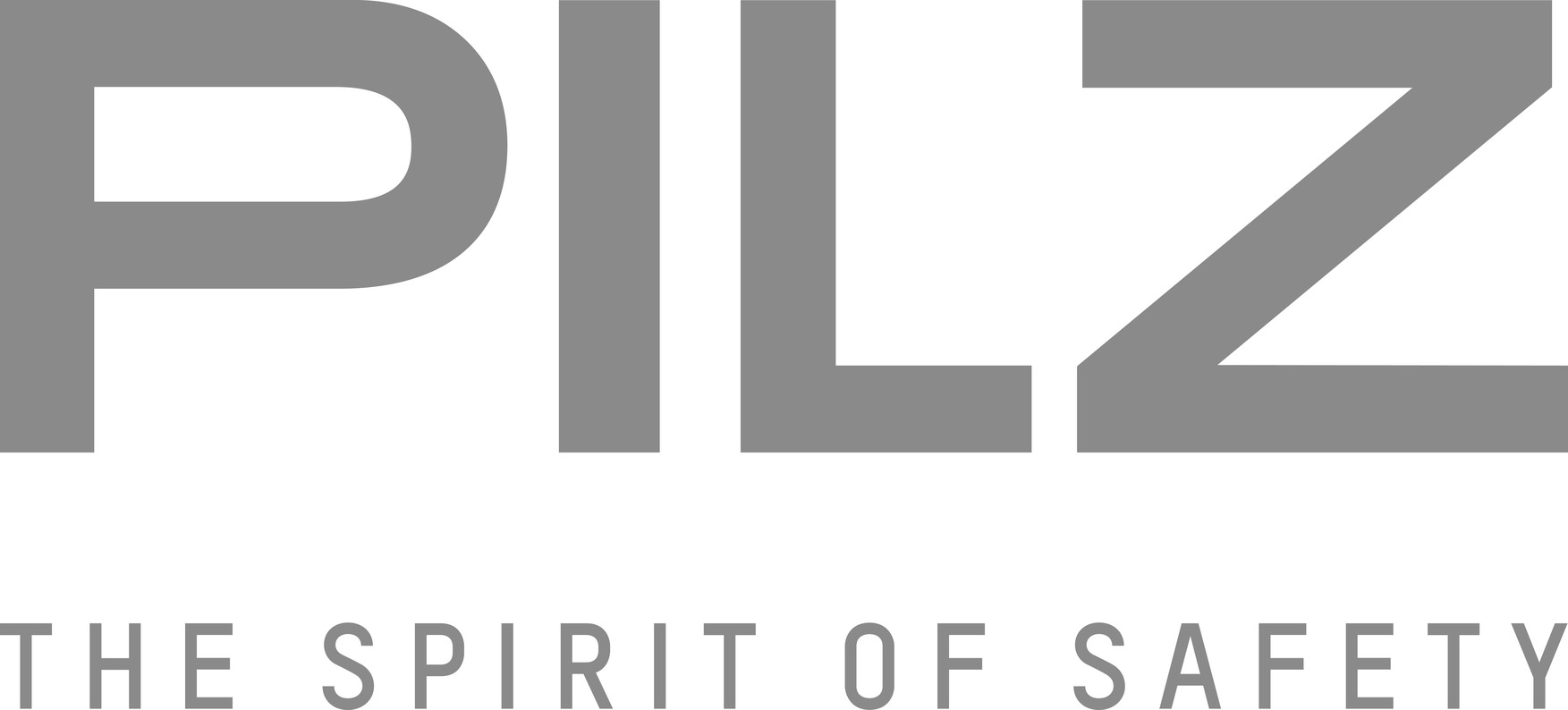
- Company type: GmbH & Co. KG
- Industry: Automation technology
- Founded: 1948
- Founder: Hermann Pilz
- Headquarters: Ostfildern, Germany
- Key people: Susanne Kunschert, Thomas Pilz
- Products: Sensor technology, motion control, safety relays, programmable safety and control systems, automation systems
- Revenue: 341 Mio. EUR (2024)
- Number of employees: 2,504 (2024)
- Subsidiaries: 42
- Website: www.pilz.com

Pilz GmbH & Co. KG is a German automation technology company headquartered in Ostfildern, Germany, with 42 subsidiaries and branches on all continents.

The company was founded as a glass-blowing business by Hermann Pilz in Esslingen in 1948. Initial products included glass apparatus for medical technology and mercury relays for industrial applications.

In the 1960s control passed to Pilz' son Peter, who developed the company into a supplier of electronic control and monitoring devices and programmable logic controllers. In 1987 he launched safety relay PNOZ, an emergency stop system. PSS control systems were developed in the 1990s. Other products and services include sensor technology, bus and industrial wireless systems, risk assessments and machinery safety training courses.
