= 2000 United States presidential election in Mississippi =

- November 7, 2000

Nominee	George W. Bush	Al Gore
Party	Republican	Democratic
Home state	Texas	Tennessee
Running mate	Dick Cheney	Joe Lieberman
Electoral vote	7	0
Popular vote	572,844	404,614
Percentage	57.62%	40.70%

Bush
40–50%
50–60%
60–70%
70–80%
80–90%
90–100%
Gore
50–60%
60–70%
70–80%
80–90%
90–100%
President before election
Bill Clinton
Democratic
Elected President
George W. Bush
Republican

The 2000 United States presidential election in Mississippi took place on November 7, 2000, and was part of the 2000 United States presidential election. Voters chose seven representatives, or electors to the Electoral College, who voted for president and vice president.

Mississippi was won by Governor George W. Bush with a double-digit margin of victory of 16.92%. Bush won most of the counties and congressional districts of the state. Bush dominated the east part of the state and Gore did well in the west. As of the 2024 presidential election, this is the last election in which Yalobusha County voted for the Democratic candidate. This is also the last election in which Mississippi voted to the right of neighboring Alabama. Bush became the first Republican to win the White House without carrying Adams or Hinds Counties since Richard Nixon in 1968.

== General election ==
=== Predictions ===
Source	Rating	As of
The Orlando Sentinel	Safe R	September 10, 2000
The News and Observer	Likely R	October 18, 2000
Richmond Times-Dispatch	Safe R	October 29, 2000
The Central New Jersey Home News	Solid R	November 2, 2000
Los Angeles Times	Safe R	November 3, 2000

=== Polling ===
Poll source	Date(s)	Sample size	Margin of error	George W. Bush (R)	Al Gore (D)	Other / undecided (Note: Calculated by taking the difference of 100% and all other candidates combined.)
Mason-Dixon Polling & Strategy	November 3, 2000	625	—	52%	41%	7%
Ethridge & Associates LLC	October 31, 2000	341	—	55%	33%	12%

=== Results ===
2000 United States presidential election in Mississippi
Party	Candidate	Votes	Percentage	Electoral votes
Republican	George W. Bush	572,844	57.62%	7
Democratic	Al Gore	404,614	40.70%	0
Green	Ralph Nader	8,122	0.82%	0
Constitution	Howard Phillips	3,267	0.33%	0
Reform	Patrick Buchanan	2,265	0.23%	0
Libertarian	Harry Browne	2,009	0.20%	0
Socialist Workers	James Harris	613	0.06%	0
Natural Law	John Hagelin	450	0.05%	0
Totals		994,184	100.00%	7
Voter turnout (Voting age/registered)				48%/57%

==== By county ====
County	George W. Bush Republican		Al Gore Democratic		Various candidates Other parties		Margin		Total
County	#	%	#	%	#	%	#	%	Total
Adams	6,691	44.97%	8,065	54.20%	123	0.83%	-1,374	-9.23%	14,879
Alcorn	7,254	57.40%	5,059	40.03%	325	2.57%	2,195	17.37%	12,638
Amite	3,677	57.38%	2,673	41.71%	58	0.91%	1,004	15.67%	6,408
Attala	4,206	58.64%	2,922	40.74%	45	0.63%	1,284	17.90%	7,173
Benton	1,561	44.84%	1,886	54.18%	34	0.98%	-325	-9.34%	3,481
Bolivar	4,847	35.80%	8,436	62.31%	255	1.88%	-3,589	-26.51%	13,538
Calhoun	3,448	59.88%	2,251	39.09%	59	1.02%	1,197	20.79%	5,758
Carroll	3,165	64.28%	1,726	35.05%	33	0.67%	1,439	29.22%	4,924
Chickasaw	3,549	49.46%	3,519	49.05%	107	1.49%	30	0.42%	7,175
Choctaw	2,398	64.48%	1,278	34.36%	43	1.16%	1,120	30.12%	3,719
Claiborne	883	19.13%	3,670	79.52%	62	1.34%	-2,787	-60.39%	4,615
Clarke	4,503	65.08%	2,368	34.22%	48	0.69%	2,135	30.86%	6,919
Clay	3,570	43.72%	4,515	55.30%	80	0.98%	-945	-11.57%	8,165
Coahoma	3,695	38.68%	5,662	59.27%	196	2.05%	-1,967	-20.59%	9,553
Copiah	5,643	53.30%	4,845	45.76%	99	0.94%	798	7.54%	10,587
Covington	4,180	60.75%	2,623	38.12%	78	1.13%	1,557	22.63%	6,881
DeSoto	24,879	71.21%	9,586	27.44%	471	1.35%	15,293	43.77%	34,936
Forrest	13,281	59.69%	8,500	38.20%	470	2.11%	4,781	21.49%	22,251
Franklin	2,427	61.40%	1,486	37.59%	40	1.01%	941	23.80%	3,953
George	5,143	70.61%	1,977	27.14%	164	2.25%	3,166	43.47%	7,284
Greene	3,082	69.48%	1,317	29.69%	37	0.83%	1,765	39.79%	4,436
Grenada	4,743	54.88%	3,813	44.12%	87	1.01%	930	10.76%	8,643
Hancock	9,326	64.11%	4,801	33.00%	421	2.89%	4,525	31.10%	14,548
Harrison	32,256	61.30%	19,142	36.38%	1,218	2.31%	13,114	24.92%	52,616
Hinds	37,753	43.01%	46,789	53.31%	3,228	3.68%	-9,036	-10.30%	87,770
Holmes	1,937	26.10%	5,447	73.39%	38	0.51%	-3,510	-47.29%	7,422
Humphreys	1,628	41.28%	2,288	58.01%	28	0.71%	-660	-16.73%	3,944
Issaquena	366	38.89%	555	58.98%	20	2.13%	-189	-20.09%	941
Itawamba	5,424	63.33%	2,994	34.96%	146	1.70%	2,430	28.37%	8,564
Jackson	30,068	66.66%	14,193	31.47%	846	1.88%	15,875	35.19%	45,107
Jasper	3,294	51.09%	3,104	48.15%	49	0.76%	190	2.95%	6,447
Jefferson	600	17.61%	2,786	81.75%	22	0.65%	-2,186	-64.14%	3,408
Jefferson Davis	2,437	45.83%	2,835	53.32%	45	0.85%	-398	-7.49%	5,317
Jones	16,341	67.14%	7,713	31.69%	286	1.18%	8,628	35.45%	24,340
Kemper	1,915	44.94%	2,311	54.24%	35	0.82%	-396	-9.29%	4,261
Lafayette	7,081	55.85%	5,139	40.53%	458	3.61%	1,942	15.32%	12,678
Lamar	12,795	77.07%	3,478	20.95%	329	1.98%	9,317	56.12%	16,602
Lauderdale	17,315	66.67%	8,412	32.39%	243	0.94%	8,903	34.28%	25,970
Lawrence	3,674	55.78%	2,841	43.13%	72	1.09%	833	12.65%	6,587
Leake	4,114	59.18%	2,793	40.18%	45	0.65%	1,321	19.00%	6,952
Lee	15,551	61.97%	9,142	36.43%	401	1.60%	6,409	25.54%	25,094
Leflore	4,626	41.03%	6,401	56.77%	249	2.21%	-1,775	-15.74%	11,276
Lincoln	8,540	65.69%	4,358	33.52%	102	0.78%	4,182	32.17%	13,000
Lowndes	11,404	59.30%	7,537	39.19%	289	1.50%	3,867	20.11%	19,230
Madison	19,109	64.00%	10,416	34.88%	334	1.12%	8,693	29.11%	29,859
Marion	6,796	61.79%	4,114	37.41%	88	0.80%	2,682	24.39%	10,998
Marshall	4,723	37.51%	7,735	61.43%	134	1.06%	-3,012	-23.92%	12,592
Monroe	7,397	55.37%	5,783	43.29%	180	1.35%	1,614	12.08%	13,360
Montgomery	2,630	54.24%	2,187	45.10%	32	0.66%	443	9.14%	4,849
Neshoba	6,409	70.69%	2,563	28.27%	94	1.04%	3,846	42.42%	9,066
Newton	5,540	71.59%	2,147	27.75%	51	0.66%	3,393	43.85%	7,738
Noxubee	1,530	30.88%	3,383	68.29%	41	0.83%	-1,853	-37.40%	4,954
Oktibbeha	7,959	53.76%	6,443	43.52%	402	2.72%	1,516	10.24%	14,804
Panola	5,424	47.62%	5,880	51.63%	85	0.75%	-456	-4.00%	11,389
Pearl River	11,575	70.25%	4,611	27.98%	291	1.77%	6,964	42.26%	16,477
Perry	3,026	69.42%	1,285	29.48%	48	1.10%	1,741	39.94%	4,359
Pike	7,464	52.69%	6,544	46.20%	158	1.12%	920	6.49%	14,166
Pontotoc	6,601	69.41%	2,771	29.14%	138	1.45%	3,830	40.27%	9,510
Prentiss	5,101	60.14%	3,287	38.75%	94	1.11%	1,814	21.39%	8,482
Quitman	1,280	37.50%	2,103	61.62%	30	0.88%	-823	-24.11%	3,413
Rankin	32,983	79.60%	8,050	19.43%	402	0.97%	24,933	60.17%	41,435
Scott	5,601	60.84%	3,548	38.54%	57	0.62%	2,053	22.30%	9,206
Sharkey	1,074	37.00%	1,706	58.77%	123	4.24%	-632	-21.77%	2,903
Simpson	6,254	65.32%	3,227	33.71%	93	0.97%	3,027	31.62%	9,574
Smith	4,838	74.11%	1,620	24.82%	70	1.07%	3,218	49.30%	6,528
Stone	3,702	67.03%	1,677	30.36%	144	2.61%	2,025	36.66%	5,523
Sunflower	3,369	40.04%	4,981	59.19%	65	0.77%	-1,612	-19.16%	8,415
Tallahatchie	2,428	43.96%	3,041	55.06%	54	0.98%	-613	-11.10%	5,523
Tate	5,148	59.22%	3,441	39.58%	104	1.20%	1,707	19.64%	8,693
Tippah	5,381	64.04%	2,908	34.61%	114	1.36%	2,473	29.43%	8,403
Tishomingo	4,122	58.95%	2,747	39.29%	123	1.76%	1,375	19.67%	6,992
Tunica	792	33.47%	1,539	65.05%	35	1.48%	-747	-31.57%	2,366
Union	6,087	65.37%	3,094	33.23%	130	1.40%	2,993	32.14%	9,311
Walthall	3,476	58.97%	2,356	39.97%	63	1.07%	1,120	19.00%	5,895
Warren	10,892	58.49%	7,485	40.19%	246	1.32%	3,407	18.29%	18,623
Washington	7,367	40.20%	10,405	56.77%	556	3.03%	-3,038	-16.58%	18,328
Wayne	4,635	60.16%	2,981	38.69%	89	1.16%	1,654	21.47%	7,705
Webster	3,069	67.52%	1,426	31.38%	50	1.10%	1,643	36.15%	4,545
Wilkinson	1,423	34.72%	2,551	62.25%	124	3.03%	-1,128	-27.53%	4,098
Winston	4,645	55.51%	3,672	43.88%	51	0.61%	973	11.63%	8,368
Yalobusha	2,470	47.25%	2,674	51.15%	84	1.61%	-204	-3.90%	5,228
Yazoo	5,254	49.96%	4,997	47.52%	265	2.52%	257	2.44%	10,516
Totals	572,844	57.62%	404,614	40.70%	16,726	1.68%	168,230	16.92%	994,184

===== Counties that flipped from Democratic to Republican =====
- Alcorn (largest city: Corinth)
- Amite (largest city: Gloster)
- Chickasaw (largest city: Okolona)
- Copiah (largest city: Hazlehurst)
- Jasper (largest city: Bay Springs)
- Lawrence (largest city: Monticello)
- Montgomery (largest city: Winona)
- Pike (largest city: Magnolia)
- Walthall (largest city: Tylertown)
- Yazoo (largest city: Yazoo City)

==== By congressional district ====
Bush won four of five congressional districts, including two held by Democrats.

District	Bush	Gore	Representative
1st	60.3%	38.2%	Roger Wicker
2nd	39.1%	59.1%	Bennie G. Thompson
3rd	66.3%	32.7%	Chip Pickering
4th	54.4%	43.8%	Ronnie Shows
5th	65.6%	32.4%	Gene Taylor

== Electors ==
Technically the voters of Mississippi cast their ballots for electors: representatives to the Electoral College. Mississippi is allocated seven electors because it has five congressional districts and two senators. All candidates who appear on the ballot or qualify to receive write-in votes must submit a list of seven electors, who pledge to vote for their candidate and their running mate. Whoever wins the majority of votes in the state is awarded all 7 electoral votes. Their chosen electors then vote for president and vice president. Although electors are pledged to their candidate and running mate, they are not obligated to vote for them. An elector who votes for someone other than their candidate is known as a faithless elector.

The electors of each state and the District of Columbia met on December 18, 2000 to cast their votes for president and vice president. The Electoral College itself never meets as one body. Instead the electors from each state and the District of Columbia met in their respective capitols.

The following were the members of the Electoral College from the state. All were pledged to and voted for George W. Bush and Dick Cheney:

1. Bob Anthony
2. Miki Cassidy
3. Thomas Colbert
4. Delbert Hosemann
5. Ellen Jernigan
6. John Junkin
7. Kent Nicaud
