= Caseyville =

Caseyville may refer to:

== Places ==
United States

- Caseyville, Georgia
- Caseyville, Illinois
- Caseyville, Kentucky
- Caseyville, Mississippi
- Caseyville, Missouri
