= Kirkville =

Kirkville may refer to:

- Kirkville, Iowa
- Kirkville, Itawamba County, Mississippi
- Kirkville, Pike County, Mississippi
- Kirkville, New York

== See also ==
- Kirksville (disambiguation)
