= Lawrence County, Mississippi =

County in Mississippi, United States

- County
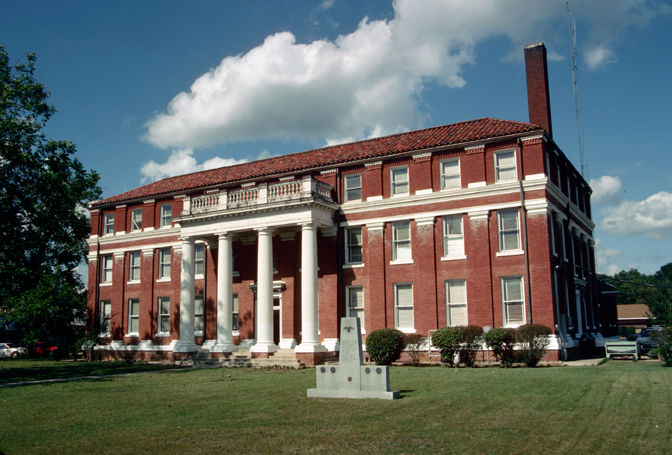
- Lawrence County Courthouse

- Location within the U.S. state of Mississippi
- Coordinates: 31°33′N 90°07′W
- Country: United States
- State: Mississippi
- Founded: 1814
- Named for: James Lawrence
- Seat: Monticello
- Largest town: Monticello

Area
  - Total: 436 sq mi (1,130 km^{2})
  - Land: 431 sq mi (1,120 km^{2})
  - Water: 5.1 sq mi (13 km^{2}) 1.2%

Population (2020)
  - Total: 12,016
  - Estimate (2025): 11,819 ▼
  - Density: 27.9/sq mi (10.8/km^{2})
- Time zone: UTC−6 (Central)
  - Summer (DST): UTC−5 (CDT)
- Congressional district: 3rd
- Website: lawrencecountyms.com

Lawrence County is a county located in the U.S. state of Mississippi. As of the 2020 census, the population was 12,016. Its county seat is Monticello. The county is named for the naval hero James Lawrence.

== Geography ==
According to the U.S. Census Bureau, the county has a total area of 436 square miles (1,130 km^{2}), of which 431 square miles (1,120 km^{2}) is land and 5.1 square miles (13 km^{2}) (1.2%) is water.

=== Major highways ===
- U.S. Route 84
- Mississippi Highway 27
- Mississippi Highway 43
- Mississippi Highway 44

=== Adjacent counties ===
- Simpson County (northeast)
- Jefferson Davis County (east)
- Marion County (southeast)
- Walthall County (south)
- Lincoln County (west)
- Copiah County (northwest)

== Demographics ==
Historical population
Census	Pop.	Note	%±
1820	4,916		—
1830	5,293		7.7%
1840	5,920		11.8%
1850	6,478		9.4%
1860	9,213		42.2%
1870	6,720		−27.1%
1880	9,420		40.2%
1890	12,318		30.8%
1900	15,103		22.6%
1910	13,080		−13.4%
1920	12,663		−3.2%
1930	12,471		−1.5%
1940	13,983		12.1%
1950	12,639		−9.6%
1960	10,215		−19.2%
1970	11,137		9.0%
1980	12,518		12.4%
1990	12,458		−0.5%
2000	13,258		6.4%
2010	12,929		−2.5%
2020	12,016		−7.1%
2025 (est.)	11,819	▼	−1.6%
U.S. Decennial Census; 1790-1960 1900-1990; 1990-2000 2010-2013

=== Racial and ethnic composition ===
Lawrence County, Mississippi – Racial and ethnic composition Note: the US Census treats Hispanic/Latino as an ethnic category. This table excludes Latinos from the racial categories and assigns them to a separate category. Hispanics/Latinos may be of any race.
Race / Ethnicity (NH = Non-Hispanic)	Pop 1980	Pop 1990	Pop 2000	Pop 2010	Pop 2020	% 1980	% 1990	% 2000	% 2010	% 2020
White alone (NH)	8,580	8,275	8,835	8,567	7,807	68.54%	66.42%	66.64%	66.26%	64.97%
Black or African American alone (NH)	3,834	4,109	4,233	3,961	3,690	30.63%	32.98%	31.93%	30.64%	30.71%
Native American or Alaska Native alone (NH)	9	7	21	17	17	0.07%	0.06%	0.16%	0.13%	0.14%
Asian alone (NH)	5	15	35	33	33	0.04%	0.12%	0.26%	0.26%	0.27%
Native Hawaiian or Pacific Islander alone (NH)	x	x	3	0	4	x	x	0.02%	0.00%	0.03%
Other race alone (NH)	3	1	0	4	11	0.02%	0.01%	0.00%	0.03%	0.09%
Mixed race or Multiracial (NH)	x	x	42	73	247	x	x	0.32%	0.56%	2.06%
Hispanic or Latino (any race)	87	51	89	274	207	0.69%	0.41%	0.67%	2.12%	1.72%
Total	12,518	12,458	13,258	12,929	12,016	100.00%	100.00%	100.00%	100.00%	100.00%

=== 2020 census ===
As of the 2020 census, the county had a population of 12,016. The median age was 41.6 years. 24.8% of residents were under the age of 18 and 18.8% of residents were 65 years of age or older. For every 100 females there were 90.2 males, and for every 100 females age 18 and over there were 88.0 males age 18 and over.

The racial makeup of the county was 65.3% White, 30.8% Black or African American, 0.1% American Indian and Alaska Native, 0.3% Asian, <0.1% Native Hawaiian and Pacific Islander, 0.7% from some other race, and 2.7% from two or more races. Hispanic or Latino residents of any race comprised 1.7% of the population.

<0.1% of residents lived in urban areas, while 100.0% lived in rural areas.

There were 4,823 households in the county, of which 31.7% had children under the age of 18 living in them. Of all households, 45.4% were married-couple households, 18.5% were households with a male householder and no spouse or partner present, and 31.4% were households with a female householder and no spouse or partner present. About 28.7% of all households were made up of individuals and 14.0% had someone living alone who was 65 years of age or older.

There were 5,717 housing units, of which 15.6% were vacant. Among occupied housing units, 80.8% were owner-occupied and 19.2% were renter-occupied. The homeowner vacancy rate was 0.9% and the rental vacancy rate was 11.1%.

== Communities ==
=== Towns ===
- Monticello
- New Hebron
- Silver Creek

=== Unincorporated communities ===
- Arm
- Jayess
- Oak Vale (partly in Jefferson Davis County)
- Oma
- Sontag
- Topeka

== Education ==
Public education is governed by the Lawrence County School District, which encompasses the entire county.

It is in the district of Copiah–Lincoln Community College, and has been since 1965.

== Notable people ==
- Earl W. Bascom (1906-1995), rodeo champion, cowboy artist, inventor, Mississippi Rodeo Hall of Fame inductee, "Father of Modern Rodeo" "Father of Mississippi Rodeo"
- Edgar Godbold (1872-1952), president of two Southern Baptist colleges, was a school principal in Lawrence County from 1905 to 1906.
- Rod Paige, Secretary of Education from 2001 to 2004 under President George W. Bush. Rod Paige was born and raised in Lawrence County.
- Ahmad Hardy, college football player for the Missouri Tigers.

== Politics ==
Lawrence County, like most of Mississippi, was reliably Democratic until 1960, when a majority of voters elected a slate of unpledged Democratic electors nominated by segregationist governor Ross Barnett. Afterward, the county became increasingly Republican. The last Democrat to carry the county was Jimmy Carter in 1976; Bill Clinton won the county in 1996 with an 89-vote plurality.

United States presidential election results for Lawrence County, Mississippi
Year	Republican		Democratic		Third party(ies)	
Year	No.	%	No.	%	No.	%
1912	9	2.43%	332	89.49%	30	8.09%
1916	18	2.41%	725	97.18%	3	0.40%
1920	131	19.88%	526	79.82%	2	0.30%
1924	55	7.54%	674	92.46%	0	0.00%
1928	210	21.67%	759	78.33%	0	0.00%
1932	31	3.21%	933	96.68%	1	0.10%
1936	34	2.57%	1,286	97.35%	1	0.08%
1940	37	2.95%	1,218	97.05%	0	0.00%
1944	45	2.85%	1,535	97.15%	0	0.00%
1948	13	0.97%	66	4.92%	1,262	94.11%
1952	556	33.23%	1,117	66.77%	0	0.00%
1956	276	18.17%	1,025	67.48%	218	14.35%
1960	259	15.69%	469	28.41%	923	55.91%
1964	2,373	90.95%	236	9.05%	0	0.00%
1968	329	8.45%	740	19.00%	2,825	72.55%
1972	3,394	81.70%	709	17.07%	51	1.23%
1976	2,109	47.54%	2,242	50.54%	85	1.92%
1980	2,781	50.02%	2,692	48.42%	87	1.56%
1984	3,970	63.49%	2,274	36.37%	9	0.14%
1988	3,682	59.17%	2,517	40.45%	24	0.39%
1992	2,689	44.12%	2,582	42.36%	824	13.52%
1996	2,392	44.54%	2,481	46.19%	498	9.27%
2000	3,674	55.78%	2,841	43.13%	72	1.09%
2004	3,956	62.73%	2,308	36.60%	42	0.67%
2008	4,369	62.33%	2,587	36.91%	53	0.76%
2012	4,192	62.59%	2,468	36.85%	38	0.57%
2016	4,091	64.28%	2,195	34.49%	78	1.23%
2020	4,285	64.80%	2,260	34.18%	68	1.03%
2024	4,113	67.95%	1,899	31.37%	41	0.68%

== See also ==
- National Register of Historic Places listings in Lawrence County, Mississippi
