= Jefferson Davis County, Mississippi =

County in Mississippi, United States

- County
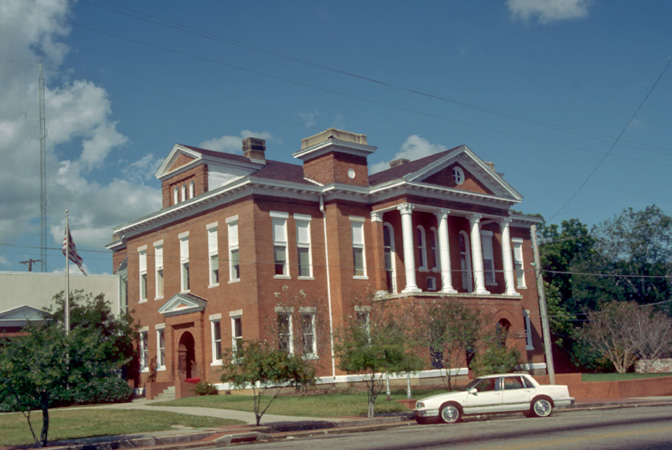
- Jefferson Davis County Courthouse in Prentiss

- Location within the U.S. state of Mississippi
- Coordinates: 31°34′N 89°49′W
- Country: United States
- State: Mississippi
- Founded: 1906
- Named for: Jefferson Davis
- Seat: Prentiss
- Largest town: Prentiss

Area
  - Total: 409 sq mi (1,060 km^{2})
  - Land: 408 sq mi (1,060 km^{2})
  - Water: 0.7 sq mi (1.8 km^{2}) 0.2%

Population (2020)
  - Total: 11,321
  - Estimate (2025): 10,941 ▼
  - Density: 27.7/sq mi (10.7/km^{2})
- Time zone: UTC−6 (Central)
  - Summer (DST): UTC−5 (CDT)
- Congressional district: 3rd
- Website: www.co.jefferson-davis.ms.us

Jefferson Davis County is a county located in the U.S. state of Mississippi. As of the 2020 census, the population was 11,321. Its county seat is Prentiss. The county is named after Mississippi Senator and Confederate President Jefferson Davis. The county was carved out of Covington and Lawrence counties in March 1906. Governor James K. Vardaman signed the bill creating the county on May 9, 1906.

== History ==
The genesis of the county occurred on March 31, 1906, when a Mississippi state legislative act authorized the new country's boundaries. The residents of western Covington County and eastern Lawrence County had frequently complained of the rivers and streams impeding the route to their respective county seats. Jefferson Davis County was the state's 77th county.

A 1906 special referendum determined that the county seat would be Prentiss, named for either famed Mississippi lawmaker and orator Seargent Smith Prentiss, or wealthy landowner Prentiss Webb Berry. The settlement was originally named Blountville after early settler William Blount.

In 1933, the county was the first in Mississippi to issue a prohibition on alcohol after the repeal of the Eighteenth Amendment to the United States Constitution. Round dancing in the community hall was banned in 1938.

In 1935, notorious bank robber Raymond Hamilton, known to hide out in the county's wilderness, was involved in a hostage situation after robbing Prentiss' Bank of Blountville, but escaped in Memphis.

== Geography ==
According to the U.S. Census Bureau, the county has a total area of 409 square miles (1,060 km^{2}), of which 408 square miles (1,060 km^{2}) is land and 0.7 square miles (1.8 km^{2}) (0.2%) is water.

=== Major highways ===
- U.S. Route 84
- Mississippi Highway 13
- Mississippi Highway 35
- Mississippi Highway 42
- Mississippi Highway 43

=== Adjacent counties ===
- Simpson County (north)
- Covington County (east)
- Lamar County (southeast)
- Marion County (south)
- Lawrence County (west)

== Demographics ==
Historical population
Census	Pop.	Note	%±
1910	12,860		—
1920	12,755		−0.8%
1930	14,281		12.0%
1940	15,869		11.1%
1950	15,500		−2.3%
1960	13,540		−12.6%
1970	12,936		−4.5%
1980	13,846		7.0%
1990	14,051		1.5%
2000	13,962		−0.6%
2010	12,487		−10.6%
2020	11,321		−9.3%
2025 (est.)	10,941	▼	−3.4%
U.S. Decennial Census; 1790-1960 1900-1990; 1990-2000 2010-2013

=== Racial and ethnic composition ===
Jefferson Davis County, Mississippi – Racial and ethnic composition Note: the US Census treats Hispanic/Latino as an ethnic category. This table excludes Latinos from the racial categories and assigns them to a separate category. Hispanics/Latinos may be of any race.
Race / Ethnicity (NH = Non-Hispanic)	Pop 1980	Pop 1990	Pop 2000	Pop 2010	Pop 2020	% 1980	% 1990	% 2000	% 2010	% 2020
White alone (NH)	6,381	6,324	5,781	4,802	4,330	46.09%	45.01%	41.41%	38.46%	38.25%
Black or African American alone (NH)	7,369	7,640	7,961	7,461	6,622	53.22%	54.37%	57.02%	59.75%	58.49%
Native American or Alaska Native alone (NH)	5	21	12	32	8	0.04%	0.15%	0.09%	0.26%	0.07%
Asian alone (NH)	13	22	18	18	21	0.09%	0.16%	0.13%	0.14%	0.19%
Native Hawaiian or Pacific Islander alone (NH)	x	x	1	2	0	x	x	0.01%	0.02%	0.00%
Other race alone (NH)	5	0	5	3	16	0.04%	0.00%	0.04%	0.02%	0.14%
Mixed race or Multiracial (NH)	x	x	77	68	223	x	x	0.55%	0.54%	1.97%
Hispanic or Latino (any race)	73	44	107	101	101	0.53%	0.31%	0.77%	0.81%	0.89%
Total	13,846	14,051	13,962	12,487	11,321	100.00%	100.00%	100.00%	100.00%	100.00%

=== 2020 census ===
As of the 2020 census, the county had a population of 11,321. The median age was 44.9 years. 20.8% of residents were under the age of 18 and 21.3% of residents were 65 years of age or older. For every 100 females there were 91.2 males, and for every 100 females age 18 and over there were 89.2 males age 18 and over.

The racial makeup of the county was 38.5% White, 58.7% Black or African American, 0.1% American Indian and Alaska Native, 0.2% Asian, <0.1% Native Hawaiian and Pacific Islander, 0.4% from some other race, and 2.2% from two or more races. Hispanic or Latino residents of any race comprised 0.9% of the population.

<0.1% of residents lived in urban areas, while 100.0% lived in rural areas.

There were 4,777 households in the county, of which 27.7% had children under the age of 18 living in them. Of all households, 36.3% were married-couple households, 21.7% were households with a male householder and no spouse or partner present, and 37.0% were households with a female householder and no spouse or partner present. About 32.6% of all households were made up of individuals and 14.0% had someone living alone who was 65 years of age or older.

There were 5,641 housing units, of which 15.3% were vacant. Among occupied housing units, 81.0% were owner-occupied and 19.0% were renter-occupied. The homeowner vacancy rate was 1.2% and the rental vacancy rate was 9.6%.

== Communities ==
=== Towns ===
- Bassfield
- Prentiss (county seat)

=== Unincorporated communities ===
- Carson
- Oak Vale (partly in Lawrence County)

=== Ghost town ===
- Mount Carmel

== Politics ==
Typical of a majority-black county in Mississippi, Jefferson Davis leans Democratic and last voted Republican in 1984.

United States presidential election results for Jefferson Davis County, Mississippi
Year	Republican		Democratic		Third party(ies)	
Year	No.	%	No.	%	No.	%
1912	43	6.63%	542	83.51%	64	9.86%
1916	45	6.59%	634	92.83%	4	0.59%
1920	179	26.76%	485	72.50%	5	0.75%
1924	88	10.73%	732	89.27%	0	0.00%
1928	163	16.00%	856	84.00%	0	0.00%
1932	30	3.09%	940	96.71%	2	0.21%
1936	67	4.81%	1,325	95.05%	2	0.14%
1940	38	2.86%	1,289	96.92%	3	0.23%
1944	88	6.03%	1,372	93.97%	0	0.00%
1948	51	3.30%	41	2.66%	1,452	94.04%
1952	473	22.53%	1,626	77.47%	0	0.00%
1956	156	10.92%	1,049	73.41%	224	15.68%
1960	225	13.06%	510	29.60%	988	57.34%
1964	2,351	90.91%	235	9.09%	0	0.00%
1968	297	6.79%	1,465	33.48%	2,614	59.73%
1972	2,830	72.83%	1,005	25.86%	51	1.31%
1976	1,868	39.76%	2,747	58.47%	83	1.77%
1980	2,280	36.85%	3,831	61.92%	76	1.23%
1984	2,884	51.81%	2,644	47.50%	38	0.68%
1988	2,745	47.92%	2,948	51.47%	35	0.61%
1992	2,228	39.55%	2,991	53.10%	414	7.35%
1996	1,890	38.84%	2,663	54.73%	313	6.43%
2000	2,437	45.83%	2,835	53.32%	45	0.85%
2004	2,668	46.28%	2,959	51.33%	138	2.39%
2008	2,871	38.96%	4,454	60.43%	45	0.61%
2012	2,507	36.52%	4,267	62.16%	90	1.31%
2016	2,466	39.54%	3,720	59.64%	51	0.82%
2020	2,534	40.79%	3,599	57.93%	80	1.29%
2024	2,302	42.80%	3,041	56.55%	35	0.65%

== Historic sites ==
Jefferson Davis County Courthouse in Prentiss is listed on the National Register of Historic Places.

== Education ==
All residents are zoned to the Jefferson Davis County School District.

The county is in the zone of Pearl River Community College.

== See also ==
- National Register of Historic Places listings in Jefferson Davis County, Mississippi
