= Lincoln County, Mississippi =

County in Mississippi, United States

- County
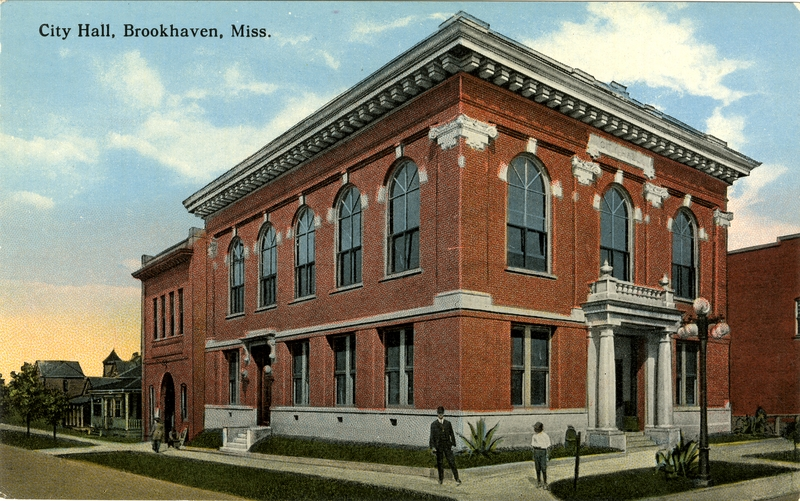
- Postcard Brookhaven City Hall, early 20th century.

- Location within the U.S. state of Mississippi
- Coordinates: 31°32′N 90°27′W
- Country: United States
- State: Mississippi
- Founded: 1870
- Named for: Abraham Lincoln
- Seat: Brookhaven
- Largest city: Brookhaven

Area
  - Total: 588 sq mi (1,520 km^{2})
  - Land: 586 sq mi (1,520 km^{2})
  - Water: 2.1 sq mi (5.4 km^{2}) 0.4%

Population (2020)
  - Total: 34,907
  - Estimate (2025): 35,012 ▲
  - Density: 59.6/sq mi (23.0/km^{2})
- Time zone: UTC−6 (Central)
  - Summer (DST): UTC−5 (CDT)
- Congressional district: 3rd
- Website: www.golincolnms.com

Lincoln County is a county located in the U.S. state of Mississippi. As of the 2020 census, the population was 34,907. Its county seat is Brookhaven. The county was created by the legislature on April 7, 1870, during the Reconstruction Era. It was formed from portions of Lawrence, Pike, Franklin, Copiah, and Amite counties. It was named for Abraham Lincoln, the 16th President of the United States. Lincoln County comprises the Brookhaven, MS Micropolitan Statistical Area, which is included in the Jackson–Vicksburg–Brookhaven Combined Statistical Area. The county is southwest of the state capital of Jackson.

== History ==
=== 2017 shooting ===
On May 27, 2017, eight people were fatally shot in a spree shooting across the county by a 35-year-old Willie Cory Godbolt. Godbolt was sentenced to death for the murders in March 2024.

== Geography ==
According to the U.S. Census Bureau, the county has a total area of 588 square miles (1,520 km^{2}), of which 586 square miles (1,520 km^{2}) is land and 2.1 square miles (5.4 km^{2}) (0.4%) is water.

=== Major highways ===
- Interstate 55
- U.S. Highway 51
- U.S. Highway 84
- Mississippi Highway 184
- Mississippi Highway 583

=== Adjacent counties ===
- Copiah County (north)
- Lawrence County (east)
- Walthall County (southeast)
- Pike County (south)
- Amite County (southwest)
- Franklin County (west)
- Jefferson County (northwest)

=== National protected area ===
- Homochitto National Forest (part), supervised by the United States Forestry Service of the U.S. Department of Agriculture.

== Demographics ==
Historical population
Census	Pop.	Note	%±
1870	10,184		—
1880	13,547		33.0%
1890	17,912		32.2%
1900	21,552		20.3%
1910	28,597		32.7%
1920	24,652		−13.8%
1930	26,357		6.9%
1940	27,506		4.4%
1950	27,899		1.4%
1960	26,759		−4.1%
1970	26,198		−2.1%
1980	30,174		15.2%
1990	30,278		0.3%
2000	33,166		9.5%
2010	34,869		5.1%
2020	34,907		0.1%
2025 (est.)	35,012	▲	0.3%
U.S. Decennial Census; 1790–1960 1900–1990; 1990–2000 2010–2013

=== Racial and ethnic composition ===
Lincoln County, Mississippi – Racial and ethnic composition Note: the US Census treats Hispanic/Latino as an ethnic category. This table excludes Latinos from the racial categories and assigns them to a separate category. Hispanics/Latinos may be of any race.
Race / Ethnicity (NH = Non-Hispanic)	Pop 1980	Pop 1990	Pop 2000	Pop 2010	Pop 2020	% 1980	% 1990	% 2000	% 2010	% 2020
White alone (NH)	21,016	21,132	22,866	23,702	22,996	69.65%	69.79%	68.94%	67.97%	65.88%
Black or African American alone (NH)	8,930	9,021	9,807	10,400	10,484	29.60%	29.79%	29.57%	29.83%	30.03%
Native American or Alaska Native alone (NH)	8	19	54	63	63	0.03%	0.06%	0.16%	0.18%	0.18%
Asian alone (NH)	29	45	81	117	163	0.10%	0.15%	0.24%	0.34%	0.47%
Native Hawaiian or Pacific Islander alone (NH)	x	x	2	8	8	x	x	0.01%	0.02%	0.02%
Other race alone (NH)	15	1	8	16	77	0.05%	0.00%	0.02%	0.05%	0.22%
Mixed race or Multiracial (NH)	x	x	119	233	710	x	x	0.36%	0.67%	2.03%
Hispanic or Latino (any race)	176	60	229	330	406	0.58%	0.20%	0.69%	0.95%	1.16%
Total	30,174	30,278	33,166	34,869	34,907	100.00%	100.00%	100.00%	100.00%	100.00%

=== 2020 census ===
As of the 2020 census, the county had a population of 34,907. The median age was 40.5 years. 24.0% of residents were under the age of 18 and 18.3% of residents were 65 years of age or older. For every 100 females there were 92.2 males, and for every 100 females age 18 and over there were 88.2 males age 18 and over.

The racial makeup of the county was 66.2% White, 30.2% Black or African American, 0.2% American Indian and Alaska Native, 0.5% Asian, <0.1% Native Hawaiian and Pacific Islander, 0.5% from some other race, and 2.4% from two or more races. Hispanic or Latino residents of any race comprised 1.2% of the population.

29.1% of residents lived in urban areas, while 70.9% lived in rural areas.

There were 13,939 households in the county, of which 32.3% had children under the age of 18 living in them. Of all households, 45.9% were married-couple households, 18.0% were households with a male householder and no spouse or partner present, and 31.4% were households with a female householder and no spouse or partner present. About 28.7% of all households were made up of individuals and 13.0% had someone living alone who was 65 years of age or older.

There were 15,744 housing units, of which 11.5% were vacant. Among occupied housing units, 74.9% were owner-occupied and 25.1% were renter-occupied. The homeowner vacancy rate was 1.2% and the rental vacancy rate was 7.5%.

=== 2000 census ===
As of the United States Census of 2000, (which precedes the large changes and increases reflected in the figures, resulting from the substantial annexations and tripling of the size of the City of Brookhaven, the county seat, from late 2007, which would be reflected in the newer United States Census of 2010)—there were 33,166 people, 12,538 households, and 9,190 families residing in the county. The population density was 57 people per square mile (22 people/km^{2}). There were 14,052 housing units at an average density of 24 units per square mile (9.3 units/km^{2}). The racial makeup of the county was 69.38% White, 29.67% Black or African American, 0.17% Native American, 0.24% Asian, 0.01% Pacific Islander, 0.16% from other races, and 0.37% from two or more races. 0.69% of the population were Hispanic or Latino of any race.

There were 12,538 households, out of which 34.90% had children under the age of 18 living with them, 54.90% were married couples living together, 14.70% had a female householder with no husband present, and 26.70% were non-families. 24.40% of all households were made up of individuals, and 11.50% had someone living alone who was 65 years of age or older. The average household size was 2.59 and the average family size was 3.08.

In the county, the population was spread out, with 26.70% under the age of 18, 9.50% from 18 to 24, 27.60% from 25 to 44, 22.30% from 45 to 64, and 13.90% who were 65 years of age or older. The median age was 36 years. For every 100 females there were 92.20 males. For every 100 females age 18 and over, there were 88.60 males.

The median income for a household in the county was $27,279, and the median income for a family was $33,552. Males had a median income of $29,060 versus $18,877 for females. The per capita income for the county was $13,961. About 16.00% of families and 19.20% of the population were below the poverty line, including 22.80% of those under age 18 and 17.10% of those age 65 or over.

== Politics ==
Lincoln County is a Republican stronghold, having been so since the 1960s. In 2024 Donald Trump won nearly three-quarters of the vote in the county, the best Republican performance since Nixon in 1972.

The offices of president and vice-president on the county supervisors rotate annually.

This county does not have "home rule;" thus, the legislature reserved to itself power over the county. Its representatives and state senators help serve its residents.

United States presidential election results for Lincoln County, Mississippi
Year	Republican		Democratic		Third party(ies)	
Year	No.	%	No.	%	No.	%
1912	41	4.43%	768	83.03%	116	12.54%
1916	105	7.46%	1,282	91.12%	20	1.42%
1920	421	34.85%	774	64.07%	13	1.08%
1924	154	10.25%	1,278	85.09%	70	4.66%
1928	422	16.15%	2,191	83.85%	0	0.00%
1932	92	3.71%	2,379	95.97%	8	0.32%
1936	74	2.90%	2,465	96.70%	10	0.39%
1940	97	3.98%	2,332	95.57%	11	0.45%
1944	103	4.04%	2,445	95.96%	0	0.00%
1948	40	1.26%	52	1.64%	3,085	97.10%
1952	2,028	47.17%	2,271	52.83%	0	0.00%
1956	848	22.48%	1,942	51.47%	983	26.05%
1960	1,251	25.61%	1,449	29.66%	2,185	44.73%
1964	6,750	93.92%	437	6.08%	0	0.00%
1968	1,057	10.66%	1,585	15.98%	7,276	73.36%
1972	7,593	86.01%	1,070	12.12%	165	1.87%
1976	6,084	58.55%	4,043	38.90%	265	2.55%
1980	7,286	57.78%	5,213	41.34%	111	0.88%
1984	8,898	66.50%	4,458	33.32%	25	0.19%
1988	8,710	65.50%	4,534	34.10%	53	0.40%
1992	7,040	53.78%	4,744	36.24%	1,307	9.98%
1996	5,960	53.85%	4,294	38.80%	813	7.35%
2000	8,540	65.69%	4,358	33.52%	102	0.78%
2004	10,008	69.06%	4,418	30.49%	65	0.45%
2008	10,781	65.73%	5,505	33.56%	116	0.71%
2012	10,839	66.04%	5,471	33.33%	104	0.63%
2016	10,550	69.44%	4,458	29.34%	185	1.22%
2020	11,596	69.02%	5,040	30.00%	165	0.98%
2024	11,432	72.35%	4,262	26.97%	108	0.68%

== Economy ==
The telecommunications company MCI Worldcom was located in Lincoln County. Its chief executive officer (CEO) and founder Bernard Ebbers resided near Brookhaven prior to his conviction; he was sentenced to prison.

== Education ==
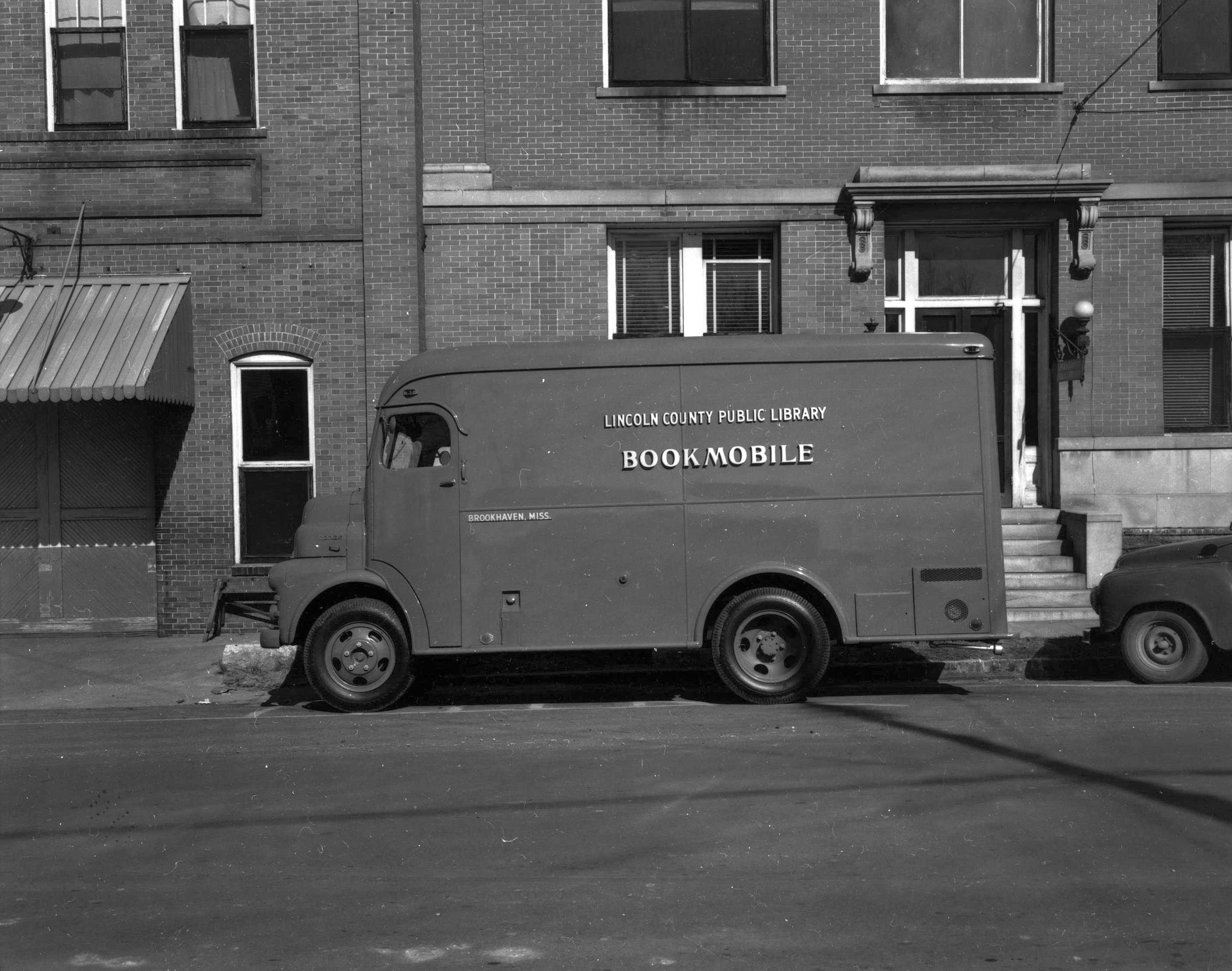
Lincoln County Public Library bookmobile in Brookhaven, 1952

The county is served by two separate public school districts (Lincoln County Public School District and Brookhaven School District), a private school, and a couple of smaller Christian or religious/private schools.

The Lincoln County School District consists of four K–12 schools of elementary, middle school, and high school levels. These include Loyd Star hornets, Bogue Chitto bobcats, West Lincoln bears and the Enterprise yellowjackets. Through annexations, the City tripled its size in 2007. As well a Brookhaven Academy cougars which is a part of the MAPS or MAIS.

It is in the district of Copiah–Lincoln Community College.

== Media ==
Lincoln County is served by the local newspaper Daily Leader, printed daily except Monday and Saturday. Residents may also purchase the larger daily newspaper from the state capital of Jackson, The Clarion-Ledger, which serves the central state metropolitan area and the entire State of Mississippi.

== Communities ==
=== City ===
- Brookhaven (county seat)

=== Town ===
- Wesson (partly located in Copiah County)

=== Hamlet ===
- Bogue Chitto

=== Unincorporated communities ===
- Auburn
- Caseyville
- East Lincoln
- Norfield
- Ruth

=== Ghost towns ===
- Woolworth

== See also ==
- National Register of Historic Places listings in Lincoln County, Mississippi
