= Pike County, Mississippi =

County in Mississippi, United States

- County
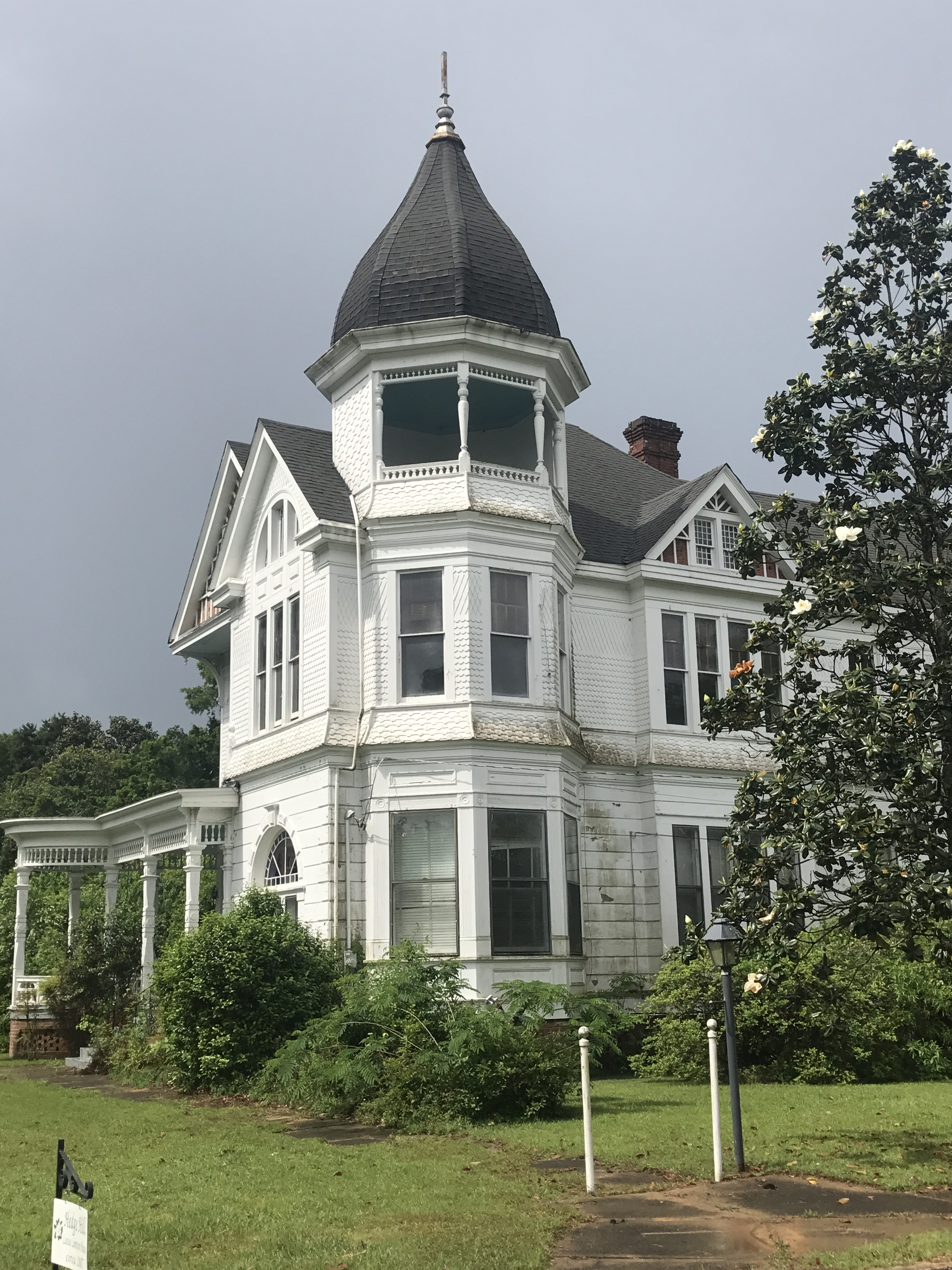
- Southtown Historic District in Magnolia, Mississippi

- Location within the U.S. state of Mississippi
- Coordinates: 31°11′N 90°24′W
- Country: United States
- State: Mississippi
- Founded: 1815
- Named for: Zebulon Pike
- Seat: Magnolia
- Largest city: McComb

Area
  - Total: 411 sq mi (1,060 km^{2})
  - Land: 409 sq mi (1,060 km^{2})
  - Water: 1.7 sq mi (4.4 km^{2}) 0.4%

Population (2020)
  - Total: 40,324
  - Estimate (2025): 38,712 ▼
  - Density: 98.6/sq mi (38.1/km^{2})
- Time zone: UTC−6 (Central)
  - Summer (DST): UTC−5 (CDT)
- Congressional district: 3rd
- Website: www.co.pike.ms.us

Pike County is a county located on the southwestern border of the U.S. state of Mississippi. As of the 2020 census, the population was 40,324. The county seat is Magnolia. Pike County is named for explorer Zebulon Pike. Pike County is part of the McComb, MS Micropolitan Statistical Area.

== History ==
Pike County was formed from Marion County by an act of the Territorial General Assembly on December 9, 1815. Holmesville was selected as the county seat on December 11, 1816; it was named in honor of Major Andrew Hunter Holmes, an army officer killed in the War of 1812. In 1873 Magnolia was voted in as the new county seat. The county was devoted to agriculture and is still mostly rural.

== Geography ==
According to the U.S. Census Bureau, the county has a total area of 411 square miles (1,060 km^{2}), of which 409 square miles (1,060 km^{2}) is land and 1.7 square miles (4.4 km^{2}) (0.4%) is water.

=== Major highways ===
- Interstate 55
- U.S. Highway 51
- U.S. Highway 98
- Mississippi Highway 24
- Mississippi Highway 44
- Mississippi Highway 48
- Mississippi Highway 570
- Mississippi Highway 583

=== Adjacent counties ===
- Lincoln County (north)
- Walthall County (east)
- Washington Parish, Louisiana (southeast)
- Tangipahoa Parish, Louisiana (south)
- Amite County (west)

== Demographics ==
Historical population
Census	Pop.	Note	%±
1820	4,438		—
1830	5,402		21.7%
1840	6,151		13.9%
1850	7,360		19.7%
1860	11,135		51.3%
1870	11,303		1.5%
1880	16,688		47.6%
1890	21,203		27.1%
1900	27,545		29.9%
1910	37,272		35.3%
1920	28,725		−22.9%
1930	32,201		12.1%
1940	35,002		8.7%
1950	35,137		0.4%
1960	35,789		1.9%
1970	36,345		1.6%
1980	36,173		−0.5%
1990	36,882		2.0%
2000	38,940		5.6%
2010	40,404		3.8%
2020	40,324		−0.2%
2025 (est.)	38,712	▼	−4.0%
U.S. Decennial Census; 1790–1960 1900–1990; 1990–2000 2010–2013

=== Racial and ethnic composition ===
Pike County, Mississippi – Racial and ethnic composition Note: the US Census treats Hispanic/Latino as an ethnic category. This table excludes Latinos from the racial categories and assigns them to a separate category. Hispanics/Latinos may be of any race.
Race / Ethnicity (NH = Non-Hispanic)	Pop 1980	Pop 1990	Pop 2000	Pop 2010	Pop 2020	% 1980	% 1990	% 2000	% 2010	% 2020
White alone (NH)	20,303	19,826	19,841	18,564	16,769	56.13%	53.76%	50.95%	45.95%	41.59%
Black or African American alone (NH)	15,415	16,810	18,433	20,740	21,457	42.61%	45.58%	47.34%	51.33%	53.21%
Native American or Alaska Native alone (NH)	21	26	74	111	113	0.06%	0.07%	0.19%	0.27%	0.28%
Asian alone (NH)	40	44	127	229	254	0.11%	0.12%	0.33%	0.57%	0.63%
Native Hawaiian or Pacific Islander alone (NH)	x	x	3	2	7	x	x	0.01%	0.00%	0.02%
Other race alone (NH)	14	3	13	8	109	0.04%	0.01%	0.03%	0.02%	0.27%
Mixed race or Multiracial (NH)	x	x	165	261	988	x	x	0.42%	0.65%	2.45%
Hispanic or Latino (any race)	380	173	284	489	627	1.05%	0.47%	0.73%	1.21%	1.55%
Total	36,173	36,882	38,940	40,404	40,324	100.00%	100.00%	100.00%	100.00%	100.00%

=== 2020 census ===
As of the 2020 census, the county had a population of 40,324. The median age was 39.9 years. 23.9% of residents were under the age of 18 and 18.7% of residents were 65 years of age or older. For every 100 females there were 91.7 males, and for every 100 females age 18 and over there were 88.0 males age 18 and over.

The racial makeup of the county was 41.9% White, 53.5% Black or African American, 0.3% American Indian and Alaska Native, 0.6% Asian, <0.1% Native Hawaiian and Pacific Islander, 0.8% from some other race, and 2.8% from two or more races. Hispanic or Latino residents of any race comprised 1.6% of the population.

38.0% of residents lived in urban areas, while 62.0% lived in rural areas.

There were 16,232 households in the county, of which 30.9% had children under the age of 18 living in them. Of all households, 36.2% were married-couple households, 21.1% were households with a male householder and no spouse or partner present, and 37.1% were households with a female householder and no spouse or partner present. About 32.0% of all households were made up of individuals and 14.1% had someone living alone who was 65 years of age or older.

There were 19,017 housing units, of which 14.6% were vacant. Among occupied housing units, 67.1% were owner-occupied and 32.9% were renter-occupied. The homeowner vacancy rate was 1.9% and the rental vacancy rate was 9.8%.

== Communities ==
=== Cities ===
- Magnolia (county seat)
- McComb

=== Towns ===
- Osyka
- Summit

=== Census-designated place ===
- Fernwood

=== Unincorporated communities ===
- Chatawa
- Holmesville
- Kirkville
- Pricedale
- Progress

== Politics ==
Pike County is a swing county in presidential elections; since 2000 it has voted Democratic four times and Republican three times.

United States presidential election results for Pike County, Mississippi
Year	Republican		Democratic		Third party(ies)	
Year	No.	%	No.	%	No.	%
1912	24	1.95%	1,068	86.90%	137	11.15%
1916	53	3.50%	1,451	95.71%	12	0.79%
1920	153	11.66%	1,114	84.91%	45	3.43%
1924	197	8.61%	1,640	71.65%	452	19.75%
1928	920	27.45%	2,431	72.55%	0	0.00%
1932	118	4.67%	2,400	94.94%	10	0.40%
1936	86	2.64%	3,170	97.21%	5	0.15%
1940	185	5.88%	2,956	93.93%	6	0.19%
1944	248	7.70%	2,972	92.30%	0	0.00%
1948	69	1.75%	221	5.61%	3,650	92.64%
1952	2,908	53.82%	2,495	46.18%	0	0.00%
1956	1,210	29.47%	1,714	41.74%	1,182	28.79%
1960	1,467	27.38%	1,258	23.48%	2,632	49.13%
1964	6,418	92.20%	543	7.80%	0	0.00%
1968	1,460	14.38%	2,848	28.05%	5,846	57.57%
1972	6,542	72.08%	2,332	25.69%	202	2.23%
1976	5,659	48.16%	5,749	48.92%	343	2.92%
1980	6,661	48.56%	6,694	48.80%	361	2.63%
1984	8,254	57.28%	6,137	42.59%	20	0.14%
1988	7,637	53.63%	6,531	45.87%	71	0.50%
1992	6,005	43.90%	6,279	45.90%	1,395	10.20%
1996	5,403	43.45%	6,302	50.68%	730	5.87%
2000	7,464	52.69%	6,544	46.20%	158	1.12%
2004	8,660	52.07%	7,881	47.38%	91	0.55%
2008	8,651	47.91%	9,276	51.38%	128	0.71%
2012	8,181	45.52%	9,650	53.69%	143	0.80%
2016	8,009	49.10%	8,043	49.31%	258	1.58%
2020	8,479	48.89%	8,646	49.86%	217	1.25%
2024	7,943	51.29%	7,402	47.80%	140	0.90%

== Education ==
Pike County has three school districts:

- McComb School District
- North Pike School District
- South Pike School District

Pike County is in the district of Southwest Mississippi Community College.

== See also ==
- National Register of Historic Places listings in Pike County, Mississippi
- Fernwood Lumber Company
- History of Pike County Mississippi 1798-1876 by Luke W. Conerly 1909
- J. J. Carter, Pike County native who served in the late 19th century in the Louisiana House of Representatives and as mayor of Minden, Louisiana
