= 1940 United States presidential election in Mississippi =

- November 5, 1940

All 9 Mississippi votes to the Electoral College

Nominee	Franklin D. Roosevelt	Wendell Willkie
Party	Democratic	Republican
Home state	New York	New York
Running mate	Henry A. Wallace	Charles L. McNary
Electoral vote	9	0
Popular vote	168,267	7,364
Percentage	95.70%	4.19%
County results
Roosevelt
80–90%
90–100%
President before election
Franklin D. Roosevelt
Democratic
Elected President
Franklin D. Roosevelt
Democratic

The 1940 United States presidential election in Mississippi took place on November 5, 1940, as part of the 1940 United States presidential election. Mississippi voters chose nine representatives, or electors, to the Electoral College, who voted for president and vice president.

Mississippi was won by incumbent President Franklin D. Roosevelt (D–New York), running with Secretary Henry A. Wallace, with 95.70% of the popular vote, against Wendell Willkie (R–New York), running with Minority Leader Charles L. McNary, with 4.19% of the popular vote.

By percentage of the popular vote won, Mississippi was the most lopsided contest in the nation, with a margin of over 91% for Roosevelt.

== Results ==
1940 United States presidential election in Mississippi
Party	Candidate	Votes	%
Democratic	Franklin D. Roosevelt (inc.)	168,267	95.70%
Republican	Wendell Willkie	7,364	4.19%
Socialist	Norman Thomas	193	0.11%
Total votes		175,824	100%

=== Results by county ===
County	Franklin Delano Roosevelt Democratic		Wendell Lewis Willkie Republican		Norman Mattoon Thomas Socialist		Margin		Total votes cast
County	#	%	#	%	#	%	#	%	#
Adams	1,869	91.80%	166	8.15%	1	0.05%	1,703	83.64%	2,036
Alcorn	2,934	95.63%	133	4.34%	1	0.03%	2,801	91.30%	3,068
Amite	1,435	95.73%	64	4.27%	0	0.00%	1,371	91.46%	1,499
Attala	2,049	96.65%	63	2.97%	8	0.38%	1,986	93.68%	2,120
Benton	935	97.50%	24	2.50%	0	0.00%	911	94.99%	959
Bolivar	2,974	92.68%	234	7.29%	1	0.03%	2,740	85.38%	3,209
Calhoun	1,958	96.36%	74	3.64%	0	0.00%	1,884	92.72%	2,032
Carroll	1,408	97.37%	38	2.63%	0	0.00%	1,370	94.74%	1,446
Chickasaw	1,764	96.76%	58	3.18%	1	0.05%	1,706	93.58%	1,823
Choctaw	1,212	94.84%	66	5.16%	0	0.00%	1,146	89.67%	1,278
Claiborne	737	94.61%	32	4.11%	10	1.28%	705	90.50%	779
Clarke	1,711	97.60%	42	2.40%	0	0.00%	1,669	95.21%	1,753
Clay	1,232	92.22%	103	7.71%	1	0.07%	1,129	84.51%	1,336
Coahoma	2,440	94.68%	137	5.32%	0	0.00%	2,303	89.37%	2,577
Copiah	2,335	97.94%	49	2.06%	0	0.00%	2,286	95.89%	2,384
Covington	1,419	96.46%	52	3.54%	0	0.00%	1,367	92.93%	1,471
DeSoto	1,491	97.13%	40	2.61%	4	0.26%	1,451	94.53%	1,535
Forrest	3,075	92.82%	228	6.88%	10	0.30%	2,847	85.93%	3,313
Franklin	1,376	97.94%	29	2.06%	0	0.00%	1,347	95.87%	1,405
George	945	96.13%	38	3.87%	0	0.00%	907	92.27%	983
Greene	926	93.35%	66	6.65%	0	0.00%	860	86.69%	992
Grenada	1,354	95.02%	62	4.35%	9	0.63%	1,292	90.67%	1,425
Hancock	1,550	88.67%	197	11.27%	1	0.06%	1,353	77.40%	1,748
Harrison	5,577	89.75%	633	10.19%	4	0.06%	4,944	79.56%	6,214
Hinds	9,917	94.82%	538	5.14%	4	0.04%	9,379	89.67%	10,459
Holmes	2,041	98.22%	37	1.78%	0	0.00%	2,004	96.44%	2,078
Humphreys	1,061	98.15%	20	1.85%	0	0.00%	1,041	96.30%	1,081
Issaquena	218	96.04%	9	3.96%	0	0.00%	209	92.07%	227
Itawamba	1,627	92.55%	119	6.77%	12	0.68%	1,508	85.78%	1,758
Jackson	2,124	92.35%	171	7.43%	5	0.22%	1,953	84.91%	2,300
Jasper	1,713	98.00%	35	2.00%	0	0.00%	1,678	96.00%	1,748
Jefferson	801	99.13%	7	0.87%	0	0.00%	794	98.27%	808
Jefferson Davis	1,289	96.92%	38	2.86%	3	0.23%	1,251	94.06%	1,330
Jones	4,517	94.91%	242	5.09%	0	0.00%	4,275	89.83%	4,759
Kemper	1,422	97.13%	42	2.87%	0	0.00%	1,380	94.26%	1,464
Lafayette	2,188	97.03%	65	2.88%	2	0.09%	2,123	94.15%	2,255
Lamar	1,148	95.43%	55	4.57%	0	0.00%	1,093	90.86%	1,203
Lauderdale	5,936	95.04%	303	4.85%	7	0.11%	5,633	90.19%	6,246
Lawrence	1,218	97.05%	37	2.95%	0	0.00%	1,181	94.10%	1,255
Leake	2,802	99.26%	17	0.60%	4	0.14%	2,785	98.65%	2,823
Lee	3,814	96.93%	120	3.05%	1	0.03%	3,694	93.88%	3,935
Leflore	2,404	95.59%	111	4.41%	0	0.00%	2,293	91.17%	2,515
Lincoln	2,332	95.57%	97	3.98%	11	0.45%	2,235	91.60%	2,440
Lowndes	2,268	93.80%	147	6.08%	3	0.12%	2,121	87.72%	2,418
Madison	2,038	96.86%	66	3.14%	0	0.00%	1,972	93.73%	2,104
Marion	2,083	97.89%	45	2.11%	0	0.00%	2,038	95.77%	2,128
Marshall	1,403	96.69%	48	3.31%	0	0.00%	1,355	93.38%	1,451
Monroe	3,263	97.11%	94	2.80%	3	0.09%	3,169	94.32%	3,360
Montgomery	1,509	97.10%	44	2.83%	1	0.06%	1,465	94.27%	1,554
Neshoba	2,880	97.07%	77	2.60%	10	0.34%	2,803	94.47%	2,967
Newton	2,495	98.27%	41	1.61%	3	0.12%	2,454	96.65%	2,539
Noxubee	1,152	95.76%	51	4.24%	0	0.00%	1,101	91.52%	1,203
Oktibbeha	1,951	95.45%	79	3.86%	14	0.68%	1,872	91.59%	2,044
Panola	1,988	97.74%	45	2.21%	1	0.05%	1,943	95.53%	2,034
Pearl River	2,022	95.47%	88	4.15%	8	0.38%	1,934	91.31%	2,118
Perry	828	97.87%	18	2.13%	0	0.00%	810	95.74%	846
Pike	2,956	93.93%	185	5.88%	6	0.19%	2,771	88.05%	3,147
Pontotoc	2,171	96.75%	70	3.12%	3	0.13%	2,101	93.63%	2,244
Prentiss	2,117	94.72%	118	5.28%	0	0.00%	1,999	89.44%	2,235
Quitman	1,152	97.46%	29	2.45%	1	0.08%	1,123	95.01%	1,182
Rankin	2,110	98.09%	35	1.63%	6	0.28%	2,075	96.47%	2,151
Scott	2,377	98.75%	30	1.25%	0	0.00%	2,347	97.51%	2,407
Sharkey	747	97.65%	18	2.35%	0	0.00%	729	95.29%	765
Simpson	2,316	98.26%	40	1.70%	1	0.04%	2,276	96.56%	2,357
Smith	1,826	98.49%	27	1.46%	1	0.05%	1,799	97.03%	1,854
Stone	802	96.63%	28	3.37%	0	0.00%	774	93.25%	830
Sunflower	3,071	97.74%	71	2.26%	0	0.00%	3,000	95.48%	3,142
Tallahatchie	2,288	98.28%	33	1.42%	7	0.30%	2,255	96.86%	2,328
Tate	1,609	99.81%	3	0.19%	0	0.00%	1,606	99.63%	1,612
Tippah	2,248	97.27%	63	2.73%	0	0.00%	2,185	94.55%	2,311
Tishomingo	1,463	89.75%	159	9.75%	8	0.49%	1,304	80.00%	1,630
Tunica	795	98.39%	13	1.61%	0	0.00%	782	96.78%	808
Union	2,609	95.71%	108	3.96%	9	0.33%	2,501	91.75%	2,726
Walthall	1,206	96.71%	40	3.21%	1	0.08%	1,166	93.50%	1,247
Warren	3,048	94.05%	192	5.92%	1	0.03%	2,856	88.12%	3,241
Washington	2,349	88.91%	292	11.05%	1	0.04%	2,057	77.86%	2,642
Wayne	1,388	98.44%	22	1.56%	0	0.00%	1,366	96.88%	1,410
Webster	1,595	94.55%	87	5.16%	5	0.30%	1,508	89.39%	1,687
Wilkinson	942	95.34%	46	4.66%	0	0.00%	896	90.69%	988
Winston	1,979	98.70%	26	1.30%	0	0.00%	1,953	97.41%	2,005
Yalobusha	1,555	96.88%	50	3.12%	0	0.00%	1,505	93.77%	1,605
Yazoo	2,390	98.15%	45	1.85%	0	0.00%	2,345	96.30%	2,435
Totals	168,267	95.70%	7,364	4.19%	193	0.11%	160,903	91.51%	175,824
