= East Lincoln, Mississippi =

- Unincorporated community
- Location within Mississippi Location within the United States
- Coordinates: 31°29′07″N 90°17′31″W
- Country: United States
- State: Mississippi
- County: Lincoln
- Elevation: 489 ft (149 m)
- Time zone: UTC-6 (Central (CST))
  - Summer (DST): UTC-5 (CDT)
- ZIP code: 39601
- Area code: 601
- GNIS feature ID: 691833

East Lincoln is an unincorporated community located in Lincoln County, Mississippi. East Lincoln is approximately 7.4 miles (11.9 km) north of Ruth south of U.S. Route 84.

East Lincoln High School was founded in 1923 and was closed in 1957. It was the first consolidated school in Lincoln County. After localized resistance to the consolidation, the principal of the high school was shot and killed by a student. The next year, his successor was stabbed.
