= 2016 United States presidential election in Mississippi =

- November 8, 2016

Nominee	Donald Trump	Hillary Clinton
Party	Republican	Democratic
Home state	New York	New York
Running mate	Mike Pence	Tim Kaine
Electoral vote	6	0
Popular vote	700,714	488,817
Percentage	57.94%	40.11%

Trump
40–50%
50–60%
60–70%
70–80%
80–90%
90–100%
Clinton
40–50%
50–60%
60–70%
70–80%
80–90%
90–100%
Tie/No Vote
President before election
Barack Obama
Democratic
Elected President
Donald Trump
Republican

Treemap of the popular vote by county.

The 2016 United States presidential election in Mississippi was held on Tuesday, November 8, 2016, as part of the 2016 United States presidential election in which all 50 states plus the District of Columbia participated. Mississippi voters chose electors to represent them in the Electoral College via a popular vote, pitting the Republican nominee, businessman Donald Trump, and running mate Indiana Governor Mike Pence against Democratic nominee, former Secretary of State Hillary Clinton, and her running mate Virginia Senator Tim Kaine. Mississippi has six electoral votes in the Electoral College.

Mississippi has not voted Democratic since 1976. Since that time, Republicans have dominated the state's political elections, and so Trump was widely expected to win the state. Indeed, Trump carried it with 57.94% of the vote, while Clinton received 40.11%. Trump's 17.83% margin of victory was a 6.33% increase over the 11.50% margin of victory by which Republican nominee Mitt Romney won the state over Barack Obama in 2012. This also marked the first time since 1988 that Madison County voted more Democratic than the state as a whole. Trump became the first Republican to win the White House without carrying Oktibbeha County since Richard Nixon in 1968, as well as the first to do so without carrying Copiah, Pike, or Yazoo Counties since Ronald Reagan in 1980.

== Primary elections ==
=== Democratic primary ===
2016 Mississippi primary
- March 8, 2016

Candidate	Hillary Clinton	Bernie Sanders
Home state	New York	Vermont
Delegate count	31	5
Popular vote	187,334	37,748
Percentage	82.47%	16.62%
- Democratic primary results by county Hillary Clinton

Fueled by robust support from black voters, Clinton overwhelmed Mr. Sanders in Southern states. The Vermont senator barely competed in Mississippi and was still struggling to broaden his appeal beyond white, liberal voters.

Mississippi Democratic primary, March 8, 2016
Candidate	Popular vote		Estimated delegates		
Candidate	Count	Percentage	Pledged	Unpledged	Total
Hillary Clinton	187,334	82.47%	31	3	34
Bernie Sanders	37,748	16.62%	5	2	7
Willie Wilson	919	0.40%			
Martin O'Malley (withdrawn)	672	0.30%			
Rocky De La Fuente	481	0.21%			
Write-in	10	0.00%			
Total	227,164	100%	36	5	41

=== Republican primary ===
Republican primary results by county. Trump Cruz

Twelve candidates appeared on the Republican presidential primary ballot:

- Donald Trump
- Jeb Bush (withdrawn)
- Ben Carson (withdrawn)
- Chris Christie (withdrawn)
- Ted Cruz
- Carly Fiorina (withdrawn)
- Mike Huckabee (withdrawn)
- John Kasich
- Rand Paul (withdrawn)
- Marco Rubio
- Rick Santorum (withdrawn)
- Lindsey Graham (withdrawn)
- George Pataki (withdrawn)

Mississippi Republican primary, March 8, 2016
Candidate	Votes	Percentage	Actual delegate count		
Candidate	Votes	Percentage	Bound	Unbound	Total
Donald Trump	196,659	47.24%	25	0	25
Ted Cruz	150,364	36.12%	15	0	15
John Kasich	36,795	8.84%	0	0	0
Marco Rubio	21,885	5.26%	0	0	0
Ben Carson (withdrawn)	5,626	1.35%	0	0	0
Jeb Bush (withdrawn)	1,697	0.41%	0	0	0
Mike Huckabee (withdrawn)	1,067	0.26%	0	0	0
Rand Paul (withdrawn)	643	0.15%	0	0	0
Rick Santorum (withdrawn)	510	0.12%	0	0	0
Chris Christie (withdrawn)	493	0.12%	0	0	0
Carly Fiorina (withdrawn)	224	0.05%	0	0	0
Lindsey Graham (withdrawn)	172	0.04%	0	0	0
George Pataki (withdrawn)	135	0.03%	0	0	0
Unprojected delegates:			0	0	0
Total:	416,270	100.00%	40	0	40
Source: The Green Papers

== General election ==
=== Predictions ===
The following are final 2016 predictions from various organizations for Mississippi as of Election Day.

Source	Ranking	As of
Los Angeles Times	Safe R	November 6, 2016
CNN	Safe R	November 8, 2016
Rothenberg Political Report	Safe R	November 7, 2016
Sabato's Crystal Ball	Safe R	November 7, 2016
NBC	Likely R	November 7, 2016
RealClearPolitics	Safe R	November 8, 2016
Fox News	Safe R	November 7, 2016
ABC	Safe R	November 7, 2016

=== Results ===
2016 United States presidential election in Mississippi
Party	Candidate	Votes	%	±%
Republican	Donald Trump Mike Pence	700,714	57.94%	+2.65%
Democratic	Hillary Clinton Tim Kaine	485,131	40.11%	−3.68%
Libertarian	Gary Johnson Bill Weld	14,435	1.19%	+0.67%
Constitution	Darrell Castle Scott Bradley	3,987	0.33%	+0.13%
Green	Jill Stein Ajamu Baraka	3,731	0.31%	+0.19%
Prohibition	James Hedges Bill Bayes	715	0.06%	N/A
American Delta	Rocky De La Fuente Michael Steinberg	644	0.05%	N/A
Total votes		1,209,257	100.00%	N/A

==== By county ====
County	Donald Trump Republican		Hillary Clinton Democratic		Various candidates Other parties		Margin		Total
County	#	%	#	%	#	%	#	%	Total
Adams	5,874	42.45%	7,757	56.06%	205	1.48%	-1,883	-13.61%	13,836
Alcorn	11,819	79.95%	2,684	18.16%	280	1.89%	9,135	61.79%	14,783
Amite	4,289	60.84%	2,697	38.26%	64	0.91%	1,592	22.58%	7,050
Attala	4,897	59.31%	3,242	39.27%	117	1.42%	1,655	20.05%	8,256
Benton	2,251	56.09%	1,719	42.84%	43	1.07%	532	13.26%	4,013
Bolivar	4,590	33.20%	9,046	65.44%	188	1.36%	-4,456	-32.23%	13,824
Calhoun	4,390	68.64%	1,910	29.86%	96	1.50%	2,480	38.77%	6,396
Carroll	3,799	68.72%	1,680	30.39%	49	0.89%	2,119	38.33%	5,528
Chickasaw	4,127	52.31%	3,649	46.25%	114	1.44%	478	6.06%	7,890
Choctaw	2,788	68.59%	1,218	29.96%	59	1.45%	1,570	38.62%	4,065
Claiborne	540	12.64%	3,708	86.80%	24	0.56%	-3,168	-74.16%	4,272
Clarke	5,137	65.94%	2,585	33.18%	69	0.89%	2,552	32.76%	7,791
Clay	4,150	41.49%	5,722	57.20%	131	1.31%	-1,572	-15.72%	10,003
Coahoma	2,426	27.22%	6,378	71.57%	108	1.21%	-3,952	-44.34%	8,912
Copiah	6,103	47.01%	6,741	51.93%	138	1.06%	-638	-4.91%	12,982
Covington	5,435	61.68%	3,276	37.18%	100	1.13%	2,159	24.50%	8,811
DeSoto	43,089	65.59%	20,591	31.34%	2,015	3.07%	22,498	34.25%	65,695
Forrest	15,461	55.09%	11,716	41.75%	887	3.16%	3,745	13.34%	28,064
Franklin	2,721	63.43%	1,502	35.01%	67	1.56%	1,219	28.41%	4,290
George	8,696	87.92%	1,027	10.38%	168	1.70%	7,669	77.54%	9,891
Greene	4,335	80.74%	974	18.14%	60	1.12%	3,361	62.60%	5,369
Grenada	5,970	56.79%	4,424	42.08%	119	1.13%	1,546	14.71%	10,513
Hancock	13,811	78.31%	3,344	18.96%	482	2.73%	10,467	59.35%	17,637
Harrison	40,354	63.74%	21,169	33.44%	1,790	2.83%	19,185	30.30%	63,313
Hinds	25,275	26.69%	67,594	71.39%	1,812	1.91%	-42,319	-44.70%	94,681
Holmes	1,309	16.21%	6,689	82.83%	78	0.97%	-5,380	-66.62%	8,076
Humphreys	1,151	27.06%	3,071	72.21%	31	0.73%	-1,920	-45.14%	4,253
Issaquena	298	42.63%	395	56.51%	6	0.86%	-97	-13.88%	699
Itawamba	8,470	86.99%	1,117	11.47%	150	1.54%	7,353	75.52%	9,737
Jackson	33,629	67.85%	14,657	29.57%	1,281	2.58%	18,972	38.28%	49,567
Jasper	4,038	47.65%	4,368	51.54%	69	0.81%	-330	-3.89%	8,475
Jefferson	490	12.69%	3,337	86.45%	33	0.85%	-2,847	-73.76%	3,860
Jefferson Davis	2,466	39.54%	3,720	59.64%	51	0.82%	-1,254	-20.11%	6,237
Jones	20,133	71.01%	7,791	27.48%	428	1.51%	12,342	43.53%	28,352
Kemper	1,778	38.33%	2,827	60.94%	34	0.73%	-1,049	-22.61%	4,639
Lafayette	10,872	55.35%	7,969	40.57%	802	4.08%	2,903	14.78%	19,643
Lamar	18,751	76.25%	5,190	21.10%	651	2.65%	13,561	55.14%	24,592
Lauderdale	17,741	60.13%	11,269	38.19%	496	1.68%	6,472	21.93%	29,506
Lawrence	4,091	64.28%	2,195	34.49%	78	1.23%	1,896	29.79%	6,364
Leake	4,782	56.60%	3,584	42.42%	83	0.98%	1,198	14.18%	8,449
Lee	22,220	67.51%	10,029	30.47%	664	2.02%	12,191	37.04%	32,913
Leflore	3,212	28.83%	7,787	69.90%	141	1.27%	-4,575	-41.07%	11,140
Lincoln	10,550	69.44%	4,458	29.34%	185	1.22%	6,092	40.10%	15,193
Lowndes	13,271	51.89%	11,819	46.21%	485	1.90%	1,452	5.68%	25,575
Madison	28,265	56.75%	20,343	40.85%	1,194	2.40%	7,922	15.91%	49,802
Marion	7,836	67.01%	3,677	31.45%	180	1.54%	4,159	35.57%	11,693
Marshall	6,587	44.39%	8,023	54.07%	229	1.54%	-1,436	-9.68%	14,839
Monroe	10,167	64.01%	5,524	34.78%	193	1.22%	4,643	29.23%	15,884
Montgomery	2,818	56.41%	2,115	42.33%	63	1.26%	703	14.07%	4,996
Neshoba	7,679	72.77%	2,715	25.73%	159	1.51%	4,964	47.04%	10,553
Newton	6,548	69.38%	2,756	29.20%	134	1.42%	3,792	40.18%	9,438
Noxubee	1,200	21.53%	4,347	77.99%	27	0.48%	-3,147	-56.46%	5,574
Oktibbeha	8,576	47.32%	8,859	48.88%	689	3.80%	-283	-1.56%	18,124
Panola	7,449	49.45%	7,431	49.33%	184	1.22%	18	0.12%	15,064
Pearl River	17,782	81.26%	3,604	16.47%	497	2.27%	14,178	64.79%	21,883
Perry	4,135	76.12%	1,220	22.46%	77	1.42%	2,915	53.66%	5,432
Pike	8,009	49.10%	8,043	49.31%	258	1.58%	-34	-0.21%	16,310
Pontotoc	10,336	79.61%	2,386	18.38%	262	2.02%	7,950	61.23%	12,984
Prentiss	7,648	77.47%	2,067	20.94%	157	1.59%	5,581	56.53%	9,872
Quitman	1,001	29.75%	2,312	68.71%	52	1.55%	-1,311	-38.96%	3,365
Rankin	47,178	75.16%	14,110	22.48%	1,480	2.36%	33,068	52.68%	62,768
Scott	6,122	58.18%	4,268	40.56%	132	1.25%	1,854	17.62%	10,522
Sharkey	692	31.60%	1,479	67.53%	19	0.87%	-787	-35.94%	2,190
Simpson	7,393	64.74%	3,874	33.93%	152	1.33%	3,519	30.82%	11,419
Smith	5,928	77.72%	1,617	21.20%	82	1.08%	4,311	56.52%	7,627
Stone	5,306	75.32%	1,573	22.33%	166	2.36%	3,733	52.99%	7,045
Sunflower	2,794	29.11%	6,725	70.07%	79	0.82%	-3,931	-40.96%	9,598
Tallahatchie	2,462	41.94%	3,337	56.85%	71	1.21%	-875	-14.91%	5,870
Tate	7,495	64.46%	3,926	33.77%	206	1.77%	3,569	30.70%	11,627
Tippah	7,240	78.40%	1,842	19.95%	153	1.66%	5,398	58.45%	9,235
Tishomingo	7,166	85.61%	999	11.93%	206	2.46%	6,167	73.67%	8,371
Tunica	853	23.91%	2,667	74.77%	47	1.32%	-1,814	-50.86%	3,567
Union	9,235	80.33%	2,012	17.50%	249	2.17%	7,223	62.83%	11,496
Walthall	4,056	58.62%	2,790	40.32%	73	1.06%	1,266	18.30%	6,919
Warren	9,767	50.30%	9,284	47.82%	365	1.88%	483	2.49%	19,416
Washington	5,244	31.17%	11,380	67.64%	201	1.19%	-6,136	-36.47%	16,825
Wayne	5,990	62.40%	3,524	36.71%	85	0.89%	2,466	25.69%	9,599
Webster	3,976	78.44%	1,019	20.10%	74	1.46%	2,957	58.33%	5,069
Wilkinson	1,318	31.25%	2,857	67.73%	43	1.02%	-1,539	-36.49%	4,218
Winston	4,910	55.29%	3,850	43.35%	121	1.36%	1,060	11.94%	8,881
Yalobusha	3,376	55.55%	2,582	42.49%	119	1.96%	794	13.07%	6,077
Yazoo	4,598	45.66%	5,369	53.32%	103	1.02%	-771	-7.66%	10,070
Totals	700,714	57.94%	485,131	40.11%	23,512	2.94%	215,583	17.83%	1,209,357

Counties that flipped from Democratic to Republican

- Benton (largest town: Hickory Flat)
- Chickasaw (largest city: Houston)
- Panola (largest city: Batesville)
- Warren (largest city: Vicksburg)

==== By congressional district ====
Trump won three of four congressional districts.

District	Trump	Clinton	Representative
1st	65%	32%	Trent Kelly
2nd	35%	64%	Bennie Thompson
3rd	61%	37%	Gregg Harper
4th	69%	28%	Steven Palazzo

== Analysis ==
Per the county swing map, most Mississippi counties barely swung towards Trump.

As expected, Trump won the state, with the state shifting rightward by 6%. The five Deep South states did not shift particularly hard towards Trump in 2016, and Georgia outright swung leftward. This was due to a combination of racial polarization and the state's white voters without college degrees already being extremely Republican. Mississippi is 38% Black, and most of the state's counties narrowly swung towards Trump due to extremely high racial polarization.

The regions of the country that swung the hardest towards Trump were instead the Upland South (i.e. West Virginia and Kentucky), the Midwest, and the Northern United States.

== See also ==
- Democratic Party presidential debates, 2016
- Democratic Party presidential primaries, 2016
- Republican Party presidential debates, 2016
- Republican Party presidential primaries, 2016
