= Kirksville (disambiguation) =

Kirksville is a city in Adair County, Missouri, United States.

Kirksville may also refer to:

- Kirksville, Indiana, United States
- Kirksville, Illinois, United States
- Kirksville, Kentucky, United States

== See also ==
- Kirkville
