= Walthall County, Mississippi =

County in Mississippi, United States

- County
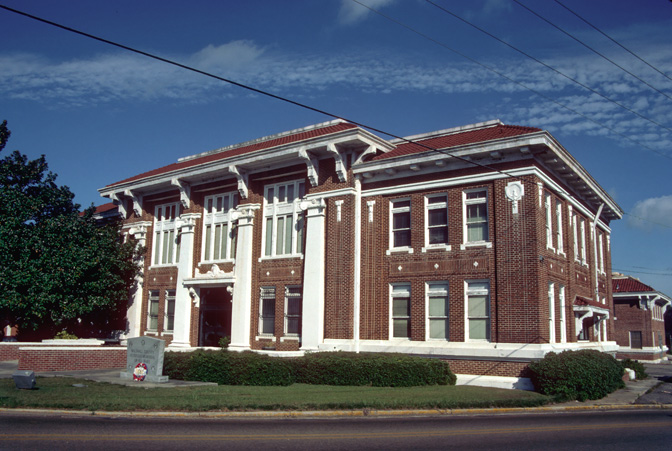
- Walthall County Courthouse in Tylertown

- Location within the U.S. state of Mississippi
- Coordinates: 31°08′N 90°06′W
- Country: United States
- State: Mississippi
- Founded: 1912
- Named for: Edward C. Walthall
- Seat: Tylertown
- Largest town: Tylertown

Area
  - Total: 404 sq mi (1,050 km^{2})
  - Land: 404 sq mi (1,050 km^{2})
  - Water: 0.5 sq mi (1.3 km^{2}) 0.1%

Population (2020)
  - Total: 13,884
  - Estimate (2025): 13,928 ▲
  - Density: 34.4/sq mi (13.3/km^{2})
- Time zone: UTC−6 (Central)
  - Summer (DST): UTC−5 (CDT)
- Congressional district: 3rd
- Website: www.walthallchamber.com

Walthall County is a county located in the U.S. state of Mississippi. As of the 2020 census, the population was 13,884. Its county seat is Tylertown. The county is named after Civil War Confederate general and Mississippi Senator Edward C. Walthall.

== Geography ==
According to the U.S. Census Bureau, the county has a total area of 404 square miles (1,050 km^{2}), of which 404 square miles (1,050 km^{2}) is land and 0.5 square miles (1.3 km^{2}) (0.1%) is water. It is the second-smallest county in Mississippi by area.

Magee's Creek flows through the Holmes Water Park in Tylertown and is designated as an eligible stream for The State Scenic Streams Stewardship Program from the confluence of Varnell Creek to the Bogue Chitto River.

Walthall County is located in Southwest Mississippi.

=== Major highways ===
- U.S. Highway 98
- Mississippi Highway 27
- Mississippi Highway 44
- Mississippi Highway 48

=== Adjacent counties ===
- Lawrence County (north)
- Marion County (east)
- Washington Parish, Louisiana (south)
- Pike County (west)
- Lincoln County (northwest)

== Demographics ==
Historical population
Census	Pop.	Note	%±
1920	13,455		—
1930	13,871		3.1%
1940	17,534		26.4%
1950	15,563		−11.2%
1960	13,512		−13.2%
1970	12,500		−7.5%
1980	13,761		10.1%
1990	14,352		4.3%
2000	15,156		5.6%
2010	15,443		1.9%
2020	13,884		−10.1%
2025 (est.)	13,928	▲	0.3%
U.S. Decennial Census; 1790-1960 1900-1990; 1990-2000 2010-2013

=== Racial and ethnic composition ===
Walthall County, Mississippi – Racial and ethnic composition Note: the US Census treats Hispanic/Latino as an ethnic category. This table excludes Latinos from the racial categories and assigns them to a separate category. Hispanics/Latinos may be of any race.
Race / Ethnicity (NH = Non-Hispanic)	Pop 1980	Pop 1990	Pop 2000	Pop 2010	Pop 2020	% 1980	% 1990	% 2000	% 2010	% 2020
White alone (NH)	8,052	8,216	8,208	8,145	7,547	58.51%	57.25%	54.16%	52.74%	54.36%
Black or African American alone (NH)	5,526	6,044	6,593	6,837	5,706	40.16%	42.11%	43.50%	44.27%	41.10%
Native American or Alaska Native alone (NH)	3	15	18	49	42	0.02%	0.10%	0.12%	0.32%	0.30%
Asian alone (NH)	16	27	33	24	48	0.12%	0.19%	0.22%	0.16%	0.35%
Native Hawaiian or Pacific Islander alone (NH)	x	x	2	3	8	x	x	0.01%	0.02%	0.06%
Other race alone (NH)	1	0	5	11	50	0.01%	0.00%	0.03%	0.07%	0.36%
Mixed race or Multiracial (NH)	x	x	96	136	280	x	x	0.63%	0.88%	2.02%
Hispanic or Latino (any race)	163	50	201	238	203	1.18%	0.35%	1.33%	1.54%	1.46%
Total	13,761	14,352	15,156	15,443	13,884	100.00%	100.00%	100.00%	100.00%	100.00%

=== 2020 census ===
As of the 2020 census, the county had a population of 13,884. The median age was 43.8 years. 22.2% of residents were under the age of 18 and 21.3% of residents were 65 years of age or older. For every 100 females there were 93.9 males, and for every 100 females age 18 and over there were 93.3 males age 18 and over.

The racial makeup of the county was 54.7% White, 41.3% Black or African American, 0.3% American Indian and Alaska Native, 0.4% Asian, 0.1% Native Hawaiian and Pacific Islander, 0.9% from some other race, and 2.4% from two or more races. Hispanic or Latino residents of any race comprised 1.5% of the population.

<0.1% of residents lived in urban areas, while 100.0% lived in rural areas.

There were 5,653 households in the county, of which 29.4% had children under the age of 18 living in them. Of all households, 43.8% were married-couple households, 20.9% were households with a male householder and no spouse or partner present, and 31.1% were households with a female householder and no spouse or partner present. About 31.0% of all households were made up of individuals and 14.5% had someone living alone who was 65 years of age or older.

There were 6,834 housing units, of which 17.3% were vacant. Among occupied housing units, 83.5% were owner-occupied and 16.5% were renter-occupied. The homeowner vacancy rate was 1.7% and the rental vacancy rate was 10.5%.

=== 2010 census ===
As of the 2010 United States census, there were 15,443 people living in the county. 53.4% were White, 44.5% Black or African American, 0.4% Native American, 0.2% Asian, 0.4% of some other race and 1.1% of two or more races. 1.5% were Hispanic or Latino (of any race).

=== 2000 census ===
As of the census of 2000, there were 15,156 people, 5,571 households, and 4,111 families living in the county. The population density was 38 people per square mile (15 people/km^{2}). There were 6,418 housing units at an average density of 16 units per square mile (6.2 units/km^{2}). The racial makeup of the county was 54.61% White, 44.09% Black or African American, 0.12% Native American, 0.24% Asian, 0.01% Pacific Islander, 0.26% from other races, and 0.66% from two or more races. 1.33% of the population were Hispanic or Latino of any race.

There were 5,571 households, out of which 34.00% had children under the age of 18 living with them, 53.00% were married couples living together, 16.90% had a female householder with no husband present, and 26.20% were non-families. 24.00% of all households were made up of individuals, and 11.50% had someone living alone who was 65 years of age or older. The average household size was 2.69 and the average family size was 3.19.

In the county, the population was spread out, with 28.40% under the age of 18, 9.90% from 18 to 24, 25.40% from 25 to 44, 22.30% from 45 to 64, and 14.10% who were 65 years of age or older. The median age was 35 years. For every 100 females there were 91.50 males. For every 100 females age 18 and over, there were 86.20 males.

The median income for a household in the county was $22,945, and the median income for a family was $29,169. Males had a median income of $26,745 versus $16,909 for females. The per capita income for the county was $12,563. About 22.40% of families and 27.80% of the population were below the poverty line, including 42.70% of those under age 18 and 17.50% of those age 65 or over.

== Communities ==
=== Town ===
- Tylertown (county seat)

=== Unincorporated communities ===
- Darbun
- Dexter
- Little Improve
- Mesa
- Salem
- Sartinville
- Union
- Hope
- Dillon
- Kirklin
- Brandon Bay
- China Grove
- Jayess
- Oak Grove
- Sunny Hill
- Smith Hill
- Beartown
- Knoxo
- Mount Mariah
- Rushingtown
- Enon

== Politics ==
Walthall County has leaned Republican in the 21st Century; prior to this, it was a traditional Democratic stronghold turned swing county. In 2024, like in many other conservative-leaning Mississippi counties, Walthall saw the strongest Republican performance since the 1972 landslide election.

United States presidential election results for Walthall County, Mississippi
Year	Republican		Democratic		Third party(ies)	
Year	No.	%	No.	%	No.	%
1916	12	1.74%	665	96.66%	11	1.60%
1920	139	22.49%	464	75.08%	15	2.43%
1924	64	8.84%	660	91.16%	0	0.00%
1928	218	20.15%	864	79.85%	0	0.00%
1932	30	2.72%	1,069	97.09%	2	0.18%
1936	28	2.22%	1,234	97.70%	1	0.08%
1940	40	3.21%	1,206	96.71%	1	0.08%
1944	68	5.24%	1,230	94.76%	0	0.00%
1948	5	0.39%	85	6.58%	1,202	93.03%
1952	491	26.57%	1,357	73.43%	0	0.00%
1956	306	17.74%	1,143	66.26%	276	16.00%
1960	310	14.49%	747	34.92%	1,082	50.58%
1964	3,014	95.14%	154	4.86%	0	0.00%
1968	387	8.05%	1,233	25.66%	3,186	66.29%
1972	3,110	79.66%	747	19.13%	47	1.20%
1976	2,110	42.83%	2,650	53.79%	167	3.39%
1980	2,703	46.91%	2,960	51.37%	99	1.72%
1984	3,305	59.65%	2,219	40.05%	17	0.31%
1988	3,103	56.40%	2,354	42.78%	45	0.82%
1992	2,728	45.72%	2,476	41.49%	763	12.79%
1996	2,239	45.27%	2,240	45.29%	467	9.44%
2000	3,476	58.97%	2,356	39.97%	63	1.07%
2004	3,888	61.21%	2,435	38.33%	29	0.46%
2008	4,253	54.67%	3,456	44.42%	71	0.91%
2012	4,051	53.65%	3,422	45.32%	78	1.03%
2016	4,056	58.62%	2,790	40.32%	73	1.06%
2020	4,220	59.28%	2,835	39.82%	64	0.90%
2024	4,114	63.01%	2,355	36.07%	60	0.92%

== Education ==
There is one school district, Walthall County School District.

The county is in the district of Southwest Mississippi Community College.

== See also ==
- National Register of Historic Places listings in Walthall County, Mississippi
