= Progress, Mississippi =

Unincorporated community in Mississippi, US

- Unincorporated community
- Location within Mississippi Location within the United States
- Coordinates: 31°02′46″N 90°19′36″W
- Country: United States
- State: Mississippi
- County: Pike
- Elevation: 374 ft (114 m)
- Time zone: UTC-6 (Central (CST))
  - Summer (DST): UTC-5 (CDT)
- Area code: 601
- GNIS feature ID: 676344

Progress is an unincorporated community in Pike County, Mississippi.

== History ==
A post office called Progress was established in 1937, and remained in operation until 1955. The community advocated progressive education at the local schoolhouse, hence the name.

Progress is served by the Progress Public Library, which is part of the Pike-Amite-Walthall Library System.
