= 1996 United States presidential election in Mississippi =

- November 5, 1996

Nominee	Bob Dole	Bill Clinton	Ross Perot
Party	Republican	Democratic	Independent
Alliance			Reform
Home state	Kansas	Arkansas	Texas
Running mate	Jack Kemp	Al Gore	Pat Choate
Electoral vote	7	0	0
Popular vote	439,838	394,022	52,222
Percentage	49.21%	44.08%	5.84%

Dole
40–50%
50–60%
60–70%
70–80%
80–90%
90–100%
Clinton
40–50%
50–60%
60–70%
70–80%
80–90%
90–100%
Tie/No Data
Tie
N/A
President before election
Bill Clinton
Democratic
Elected President
Bill Clinton
Democratic

The 1996 United States presidential election in Mississippi took place on November 5, 1996. All 50 states and the District of Columbia, were part of the 1996 United States presidential election. Mississippi voters chose seven electors to the Electoral College, which selected the president and vice president. Mississippi was won by the Republican nominee, Kansas Senator Bob Dole, who was running against incumbent Democratic President Bill Clinton of Arkansas. Clinton ran a second time with former Tennessee Senator Al Gore as Vice President, and Dole ran with former New York Congressman Jack Kemp.

Mississippi weighed in for this election as 13.5% more Republican than the national average. The presidential election of 1996 was a very multi-partisan election for Mississippi's standards, with almost seven percent of the electorate voting for third-party candidates. During this election, the vast majority of counties in Mississippi voted in majority for the Republican candidate, with the notable exceptions of Jackson’s highly populated Hinds County and a Democratic stronghold of counties bordering the Mississippi River, which have tended to vote Democratic.

In his second bid for the presidency, Ross Perot led the newly reformed Reform Party to gain over 5% of the votes in Mississippi, and to pull in support nationally as the most popular third-party candidate to run for United States Presidency in recent times. As of the 2024 presidential election, this is the last election in which the following counties voted for a Democratic presidential candidate: Alcorn, Amite, Lawrence, Walthall, and Montgomery.

This is the closest a Democrat has come to winning the state since Jimmy Carter's slim defeat in 1980. Clinton was the first Democrat to win two terms without ever carrying the state.

67% of white voters supported Dole while 24% supported Clinton. 8% supported Perot.

== Results ==
1996 United States presidential election in Mississippi
Party	Candidate	Votes	Percentage	Electoral votes
Republican	Bob Dole	439,838	49.21%	7
Democratic	Bill Clinton (incumbent)	394,022	44.08%	0
Independent	Ross Perot	52,222	5.84%	0
Libertarian	Harry Browne	2,809	0.31%	0
Taxpayers’	Howard Phillips	2,314	0.26%	0
Natural Law	Dr. John Hagelin	1,447	0.16%	0
Independent	Charles Collins	1,205	0.13%	0
Totals		893,857	100.00%	7
Voter Turnout (Voting age/Registered)				

=== Results by county ===
County	Bob Dole Republican		Bill Clinton Democratic		Ross Perot Independent		Various candidates Other parties		Margin		Total votes cast
County	#	%	#	%	#	%	#	%	#	%	Total votes cast
Adams	5,378	37.29%	8,218	56.99%	779	5.40%	46	0.32%	-2,840	-19.70%	14,421
Alcorn	4,960	45.25%	4,964	45.28%	929	8.47%	109	0.99%	-4	-0.03%	10,962
Amite	2,521	44.10%	2,824	49.41%	351	6.14%	20	0.35%	-303	-5.31%	5,716
Attala	3,130	47.34%	3,092	46.76%	383	5.79%	7	0.11%	38	0.58%	6,612
Benton	993	31.36%	1,944	61.40%	209	6.60%	20	0.63%	-951	-30.04%	3,166
Bolivar	4,027	30.56%	8,670	65.80%	320	2.43%	159	1.21%	-4,643	-35.24%	13,176
Calhoun	2,470	49.19%	2,178	43.38%	351	6.99%	22	0.44%	292	5.81%	5,021
Carroll	2,629	53.28%	2,041	41.37%	245	4.97%	19	0.39%	588	11.91%	4,934
Chickasaw	2,535	42.75%	2,971	50.10%	401	6.76%	23	0.39%	-436	-7.35%	5,930
Choctaw	1,715	53.15%	1,247	38.64%	247	7.65%	18	0.56%	468	14.51%	3,227
Claiborne	784	16.87%	3,739	80.46%	103	2.22%	21	0.45%	-2,955	-63.59%	4,647
Clarke	3,470	56.04%	2,337	37.74%	366	5.91%	19	0.31%	1,133	18.30%	6,192
Clay	2,948	38.97%	4,267	56.41%	337	4.46%	12	0.16%	-1,319	-17.44%	7,564
Coahoma	3,441	35.80%	5,776	60.10%	256	2.66%	138	1.44%	-2,335	-24.30%	9,611
Copiah	4,138	46.23%	4,415	49.33%	375	4.19%	22	0.25%	-277	-3.10%	8,950
Covington	3,219	51.05%	2,628	41.68%	417	6.61%	41	0.65%	591	9.37%	6,305
DeSoto	18,135	53.53%	10,282	30.35%	2,399	7.08%	3,065	9.05%	7,853	23.18%	33,881
Forrest	11,278	55.17%	7,965	38.96%	1,094	5.35%	105	0.51%	3,313	16.21%	20,442
Franklin	1,586	47.50%	1,381	41.36%	329	9.85%	43	1.29%	205	6.14%	3,339
George	3,311	55.71%	1,888	31.77%	710	11.95%	34	0.57%	1,423	23.94%	5,943
Greene	1,947	53.71%	1,347	37.16%	322	8.88%	9	0.25%	600	16.55%	3,625
Grenada	4,527	47.88%	4,402	46.56%	470	4.97%	56	0.59%	125	1.32%	9,455
Hancock	5,820	51.16%	4,303	37.82%	1,143	10.05%	111	0.98%	1,517	13.34%	11,377
Harrison	25,486	52.84%	18,775	38.92%	3,726	7.72%	248	0.51%	6,711	13.92%	48,235
Hinds	35,653	42.19%	45,410	53.73%	2,929	3.47%	517	0.61%	-9,757	-11.54%	84,509
Holmes	1,536	23.96%	4,720	73.62%	140	2.18%	15	0.23%	-3,184	-49.66%	6,411
Humphreys	1,382	36.24%	2,305	60.45%	110	2.88%	16	0.42%	-923	-24.21%	3,813
Issaquena	269	30.81%	546	62.54%	42	4.81%	16	1.83%	-277	-31.73%	873
Itawamba	3,490	48.22%	2,987	41.27%	732	10.11%	28	0.39%	503	6.95%	7,237
Jackson	24,918	59.86%	13,598	32.67%	2,947	7.08%	162	0.39%	11,320	27.19%	41,625
Jasper	2,615	42.50%	3,170	51.52%	353	5.74%	15	0.24%	-555	-9.02%	6,153
Jefferson	489	15.68%	2,531	81.15%	89	2.85%	10	0.32%	-2,042	-65.47%	3,119
Jefferson Davis	1,890	38.84%	2,663	54.73%	264	5.43%	49	1.01%	-773	-15.89%	4,866
Jones	13,020	59.62%	7,360	33.70%	1,362	6.24%	95	0.44%	5,660	25.92%	21,837
Kemper	1,439	38.93%	2,048	55.41%	188	5.09%	21	0.57%	-609	-16.48%	3,696
Lafayette	4,753	47.18%	4,646	46.12%	580	5.76%	95	0.94%	107	1.06%	10,074
Lamar	8,609	67.39%	3,169	24.81%	925	7.24%	71	0.56%	5,440	42.58%	12,774
Lauderdale	15,055	60.62%	8,668	34.90%	1,036	4.17%	75	0.30%	6,387	25.72%	24,834
Lawrence	2,392	44.54%	2,481	46.19%	471	8.77%	27	0.50%	-89	-1.65%	5,371
Leake	3,017	47.60%	2,902	45.79%	406	6.41%	13	0.21%	115	1.81%	6,338
Lee	11,815	54.48%	8,438	38.91%	1,361	6.28%	72	0.33%	3,377	15.57%	21,686
Leflore	4,456	38.04%	6,853	58.51%	240	2.05%	164	1.40%	-2,397	-20.47%	11,713
Lincoln	5,960	53.85%	4,294	38.80%	778	7.03%	35	0.32%	1,666	15.05%	11,067
Lowndes	9,169	56.40%	6,220	38.26%	750	4.61%	119	0.73%	2,949	18.14%	16,258
Madison	14,467	58.60%	9,354	37.89%	759	3.07%	108	0.44%	5,113	20.71%	24,688
Marion	5,023	50.39%	4,334	43.48%	585	5.87%	26	0.26%	689	6.91%	9,968
Marshall	3,272	28.85%	7,521	66.32%	482	4.25%	65	0.57%	-4,249	-37.47%	11,340
Monroe	5,206	45.97%	5,184	45.78%	889	7.85%	45	0.40%	22	0.19%	11,324
Montgomery	1,943	47.15%	1,970	47.80%	197	4.78%	11	0.27%	-27	-0.65%	4,121
Neshoba	4,545	58.37%	2,646	33.98%	560	7.19%	36	0.46%	1,899	24.39%	7,787
Newton	4,223	61.30%	2,163	31.40%	464	6.74%	39	0.57%	2,060	29.90%	6,889
Noxubee	1,287	29.94%	2,801	65.17%	119	2.77%	91	2.12%	-1,514	-35.23%	4,298
Oktibbeha	6,142	49.04%	5,923	47.29%	395	3.15%	64	0.51%	219	1.75%	12,524
Panola	3,701	38.34%	5,408	56.03%	513	5.31%	30	0.31%	-1,707	-17.69%	9,652
Pearl River	8,212	57.12%	4,892	34.03%	1,190	8.28%	83	0.58%	3,320	23.09%	14,377
Perry	2,178	53.72%	1,413	34.85%	450	11.10%	13	0.32%	765	18.87%	4,054
Pike	5,403	43.45%	6,302	50.68%	683	5.49%	47	0.38%	-899	-7.23%	12,435
Pontotoc	4,289	55.64%	2,597	33.69%	774	10.04%	49	0.64%	1,692	21.95%	7,709
Prentiss	3,473	48.73%	3,053	42.84%	574	8.05%	27	0.38%	420	5.89%	7,127
Quitman	1,121	32.54%	2,186	63.45%	126	3.66%	12	0.35%	-1,065	-30.91%	3,445
Rankin	24,585	69.40%	8,614	24.32%	2,093	5.91%	131	0.37%	15,971	45.08%	35,423
Scott	4,018	52.43%	3,163	41.27%	466	6.08%	17	0.22%	855	11.16%	7,664
Sharkey	906	34.59%	1,566	59.79%	70	2.67%	77	2.94%	-660	-25.20%	2,619
Simpson	4,455	56.56%	2,851	36.19%	525	6.66%	46	0.58%	1,604	20.37%	7,877
Smith	3,371	58.47%	1,858	32.23%	522	9.05%	14	0.24%	1,513	26.24%	5,765
Stone	2,288	53.45%	1,551	36.23%	417	9.74%	25	0.58%	737	17.22%	4,281
Sunflower	2,926	35.57%	4,960	60.30%	290	3.53%	49	0.60%	-2,034	-24.73%	8,225
Tallahatchie	1,676	34.00%	2,990	60.65%	251	5.09%	13	0.26%	-1,314	-26.65%	4,930
Tate	3,694	50.40%	3,195	43.59%	406	5.54%	35	0.48%	499	6.81%	7,330
Tippah	3,249	46.80%	2,992	43.10%	661	9.52%	40	0.58%	257	3.70%	6,942
Tishomingo	2,766	45.28%	2,709	44.34%	609	9.97%	25	0.41%	57	0.94%	6,109
Tunica	557	29.53%	1,263	66.97%	55	2.92%	11	0.58%	-706	-37.44%	1,886
Union	4,375	51.14%	3,316	38.76%	788	9.21%	76	0.89%	1,059	12.38%	8,555
Walthall	2,239	45.27%	2,240	45.29%	444	8.98%	23	0.47%	-1	-0.02%	4,946
Warren	9,261	47.77%	8,774	45.26%	1,259	6.49%	91	0.47%	487	2.51%	19,385
Washington	6,762	38.77%	10,053	57.64%	437	2.51%	188	1.08%	-3,291	-18.87%	17,440
Wayne	3,219	49.60%	2,652	40.86%	595	9.17%	24	0.37%	567	8.74%	6,490
Webster	2,254	57.85%	1,379	35.40%	255	6.55%	8	0.21%	875	22.45%	3,896
Wilkinson	1,016	24.77%	2,807	68.43%	226	5.51%	53	1.29%	-1,791	-43.66%	4,102
Winston	3,498	47.03%	3,488	46.89%	434	5.83%	18	0.24%	10	0.14%	7,438
Yalobusha	1,711	38.04%	2,437	54.18%	332	7.38%	18	0.40%	-726	-16.14%	4,498
Yazoo	4,152	44.49%	4,754	50.94%	362	3.88%	65	0.70%	-602	-6.45%	9,333
Totals	439,838	49.21%	394,022	44.08%	52,222	5.84%	7,775	0.87%	45,816	5.13%	893,857

==== Counties that flipped from Democratic to Republican ====
- Tishomingo

==== Counties that flipped from Republican to Democratic ====
- Copiah
- Hinds
- Lawrence
- Montgomery
- Walthall
- Yazoo

=== Results by congressional district ===
Dole won 4 out of 5 congressional districts, including one that elected a Democrat.

District	Dole	Clinton	Representative
1st	48.4%	42.2%	Roger Wicker
2nd	34.5%	62.1%	Bennie Thompson
3rd	58.6%	36.1%	Sonny Montgomery
3rd	58.6%	36.1%	Chip Pickering
4th	48.3%	46.4%	Michael Parker
5th	56.5%	35.6%	Gene Taylor

== See also ==
- Presidency of Bill Clinton
