= Oak Vale, Mississippi =

- Unincorporated community
- Location within Mississippi Location within the United States
- Coordinates: 31°26′19″N 89°57′52″W
- Country: United States
- State: Mississippi
- Counties: Jefferson Davis, Lawrence
- Elevation: 207 ft (63 m)
- Time zone: UTC-6 (Central (CST))
  - Summer (DST): UTC-5 (CDT)
- ZIP code: 39656
- Area codes: 601 & 769
- GNIS feature ID: 675104

Oak Vale is an unincorporated community in Jefferson Davis and Lawrence counties, Mississippi, United States. Its ZIP code is 39656. Oak Vale is located on the former Gulf and Ship Island Railroad (and sold to the Illinois Central Railroad before being abandoned) and was once home to a bank and general store. A post office operated under the name Oakvale from 1856 to 1869 and began operating under the name Oak Vale in 1873.

Oak Vale is referenced in the title of Natasha Trethewey's poem Signs, Oakvale, Mississippi, 1941.
