= 2024 United States presidential election in Mississippi =

- November 5, 2024
- Turnout: 57.5% ▼

Nominee	Donald Trump	Kamala Harris
Party	Republican	Democratic
Home state	Florida	California
Running mate	JD Vance	Tim Walz
Electoral vote	6	0
Popular vote	747,744	466,668
Percentage	60.89%	38.00%

Trump
40–50%
50–60%
60–70%
70–80%
80–90%
90–100%
Harris
40–50%
50–60%
60–70%
70–80%
80–90%
90–100%
Tie/No Data
President before election
Joe Biden
Democratic
Elected President
Donald Trump
Republican

The 2024 United States presidential election in Mississippi took place on Tuesday, November 5, 2024, as part of the 2024 United States elections in which all 50 states plus the District of Columbia participated. Mississippi voters chose electors to represent them in the Electoral College via a popular vote. Mississippi's six votes in the Electoral College were unaffected by reapportionment after the 2020 United States census.

Donald Trump ran on the Republican ballot for a third consecutive time, winning the state by a margin of 22.9%, up 6.4 points from his margin four years earlier. Trump was the first person to receive 60% of the vote in a presidential election in Mississippi since Ronald Reagan in 1984. Before the election, most news organizations considered Mississippi a safe win for Trump.

This was the first time since 2004 that the Democratic presidential nominee won less than 40% of the vote in Mississippi, a state that is 38% Black. All but one county (Sharkey County) shifted towards Republicans, and Trump flipped some majority-Black counties. Because Republicans had already essentially topped out their support among whites in Mississippi, Trump's even bigger than usual victory for a Republican in Mississippi was likely due to his relatively strong performance for a Republican candidate among black voters and in particular black men.

== Primary elections ==
=== Republican primary ===
The Mississippi Republican primary was held on March 12, 2024, alongside primaries in Hawaii, Idaho, Missouri, and Washington. 40 delegates to the Republican National Convention will be allocated to presidential candidates.

Mississippi Republican primary, March 12, 2024
Candidate	Votes	Percentage	Actual delegate count		
Candidate	Votes	Percentage	Bound	Unbound	Total
Donald Trump	229,198	92.50%	40	0	40
Nikki Haley (withdrawn)	13,437	5.42%	0	0	0
Ron DeSantis (withdrawn)	4,042	1.63%	0	0	0
Vivek Ramaswamy (withdrawn)	1,096	0.44%	0	0	0
Total:	247,773	100.00%	40	0	40

=== Democratic primary ===
The 2024 Mississippi Democratic presidential primary was held on March 12, 2024, alongside the Democrats Abroad, Georgia, Mississippi, and Washington primaries, and Northern Mariana Islands caucuses. 40 delegates to the Democratic National Convention will be allocated to presidential candidates.

In Mississippi, candidates have to pay a filing fee of $2,500 and gather at least 500 signatures to make the primary ballot. Incumbent President Joe Biden won the primary, being the only candidate that met these requirements.

==== Winner ====
- Joe Biden

Results

2024 Mississippi Democratic pres. primary
Candidate	Votes	%	Delegates
Joe Biden (incumbent)	91,053	98.71	35
Write-in votes (Note: The actual final amount was not known.)	1,187	1.29	—
Total	92,240	100%	35

== General election ==
=== Predictions ===
Source	Ranking	As of
Cook Political Report	Solid R	December 19, 2023
Inside Elections	Solid R	April 26, 2023
Sabato's Crystal Ball	Safe R	June 29, 2023
Decision Desk HQ/The Hill	Safe R	December 14, 2023
CNalysis	Solid R	December 30, 2023
CNN	Solid R	January 14, 2024
The Economist	Safe R	June 12, 2024
538	Solid R	September 20, 2024
RCP	Solid R	June 26, 2024
NBC News	Safe R	October 6, 2024
YouGov	Likely R	November 1, 2024
Split Ticket	Safe R	November 1, 2024

=== Polling ===
Hypothetical polling with Donald Trump and Joe Biden

Donald Trump vs. Joe Biden

Poll source	Date(s) administered	Sample size (Note: Key: A – all adults RV – registered voters LV – likely voters V – unclear)	Margin of error	Donald Trump Republican	Joe Biden Democratic	Other / Undecided
John Zogby Strategies (Note: Poll conducted for Kennedy's campaign)	April 13–21, 2024	423 (LV)	–	51%	42%	7%
Echelon Insights (Note: Poll sponsored by NetChoice)	August 31 – September 7, 2022	409 (LV)	± 7.8%	54%	36%	10%

Hypothetical polling with other candidates

Donald Trump vs. Robert F. Kennedy Jr.

Poll source	Date(s) administered	Sample size	Margin of error	Donald Trump Republican	Robert F. Kennedy Jr. Independent	Other / Undecided
John Zogby Strategies	April 13–21, 2024	423 (LV)	–	50%	37%	13%

Robert F. Kennedy Jr. vs. Joe Biden

Poll source	Date(s) administered	Sample size	Margin of error	Robert F. Kennedy Jr. Independent	Joe Biden Democratic	Other / Undecided
John Zogby Strategies	April 13–21, 2024	423 (LV)	–	52%	35%	13%

Ron DeSantis vs. Joe Biden

Poll source	Date(s) administered	Sample size	Margin of error	Ron DeSantis Republican	Joe Biden Democratic	Other / Undecided
Echelon Insights	August 31 – September 7, 2022	409 (LV)	± 7.8%	49%	37%	14%

=== Early voting ===
A study by the Center for Election Innovation & Research in July 2024 found that Mississippi is one of only three remaining states (along with Alabama and New Hampshire) to offer no early in-person voting option for the 2024 general election. The state also requires an eligible reason to vote by mail.

=== Results ===
State House district results: Trump 40–50% 50–60% 60–70% 70–80% 80–90% 90–100% / Harris 40–50% 50–60% 60–70% 70–80% 80–90% 90–100%

2024 United States presidential election in Mississippi
Party	Candidate	Votes	%	±%
Republican	Donald Trump; JD Vance	747,744	60.89%	+3.29%
Democratic	Kamala Harris; Tim Walz	466,668	38.00%	−3.06%
Independent	Robert F. Kennedy Jr. (withdrawn); Nicole Shanahan (withdrawn)	5,387	0.44%	N/A
Libertarian	Chase Oliver; Mike ter Maat	2,536	0.21%	−0.40%
Green	Jill Stein; Butch Ware	1,873	0.15%	+0.04%
Socialism and Liberation	Claudia De la Cruz (Note: Listed on the ballot without party affiliation.); Karina Garcia	1,075	0.09%	N/A
Constitution	Randall Terry; Stephen Broden	1,030	0.08%	–0.02%
American Solidarity	Peter Sonski; Lauren Onak	1,007	0.08%	−0.01%
Independent	Shiva Ayyadurai; Crystal Ellis	688	0.06%	N/A
Total votes		1,228,008	100.00%	N/A

==== By county ====
County	Donald Trump Republican		Kamala Harris Democratic		Various candidates Other parties		Margin		Total
County	#	%	#	%	#	%	#	%	Total
Adams	5,081	42.60%	6,743	56.53%	104	0.87%	-1,662	-13.93%	11,928
Alcorn	12,657	83.75%	2,328	15.40%	127	0.84%	10,329	68.35%	15,112
Amite	4,484	65.80%	2,246	32.96%	85	1.25%	2,238	32.84%	6,815
Attala	4,723	61.31%	2,930	38.04%	50	0.65%	1,793	23.28%	7,703
Benton	2,535	65.34%	1,318	33.97%	27	0.70%	1,217	31.37%	3,880
Bolivar	3,943	37.79%	6,419	61.51%	73	0.70%	-2,476	-23.73%	10,435
Calhoun	4,443	73.63%	1,547	25.64%	44	0.73%	2,896	47.99%	6,034
Carroll	3,730	71.81%	1,431	27.55%	33	0.64%	2,299	44.26%	5,194
Chickasaw	4,079	56.39%	3,090	42.71%	65	0.90%	989	13.67%	7,234
Choctaw	2,881	74.06%	965	24.81%	44	1.13%	1,916	49.25%	3,890
Claiborne	558	15.76%	2,950	83.31%	33	0.93%	-2,392	-67.55%	3,541
Clarke	5,093	67.27%	2,430	32.10%	48	0.63%	2,663	35.17%	7,571
Clay	4,017	44.35%	4,960	54.76%	80	0.88%	-943	-10.41%	9,057
Coahoma	2,008	29.57%	4,711	69.38%	71	1.05%	-2,703	-39.81%	6,790
Copiah	6,134	52.58%	5,426	46.52%	105	0.90%	708	6.07%	11,665
Covington	5,869	66.23%	2,921	32.96%	71	0.80%	2,948	33.27%	8,861
DeSoto	48,064	60.78%	29,023	36.70%	1,995	2.52%	19,041	24.08%	79,082
Forrest	16,579	58.24%	11,475	40.31%	412	1.45%	5,104	17.93%	28,466
Franklin	2,831	69.63%	1,213	29.83%	22	0.54%	1,618	39.79%	4,066
George	9,858	89.06%	1,138	10.28%	73	0.66%	8,720	78.78%	11,069
Greene	4,776	84.55%	835	14.78%	38	0.67%	3,941	69.76%	5,649
Grenada	5,651	57.86%	4,060	41.57%	55	0.56%	1,591	16.29%	9,766
Hancock	16,684	78.79%	4,262	20.13%	229	1.08%	12,422	58.66%	21,175
Harrison	48,497	63.88%	26,555	34.98%	871	1.15%	21,942	28.90%	75,923
Hinds	22,816	26.28%	62,840	72.37%	1,174	1.35%	-40,024	-46.09%	86,830
Holmes	1,243	18.47%	5,420	80.53%	67	1.00%	-4,177	-62.07%	6,730
Humphreys	990	28.55%	2,443	70.44%	35	1.01%	-1,453	-41.90%	3,468
Issaquena	296	47.59%	287	46.14%	39	6.27%	9	1.45%	622
Itawamba	9,523	89.66%	1,027	9.67%	71	0.67%	8,496	79.99%	10,621
Jackson	36,376	69.41%	15,469	29.52%	565	1.08%	20,907	39.89%	52,410
Jasper	4,118	52.19%	3,722	47.17%	50	0.63%	396	5.02%	7,890
Jefferson	541	16.40%	2,727	82.66%	31	0.94%	-2,186	-66.26%	3,299
Jefferson Davis	2,302	42.80%	3,041	56.55%	35	0.65%	-739	-13.74%	5,378
Jones	20,265	73.01%	7,272	26.20%	218	0.79%	12,993	46.81%	27,755
Kemper	1,691	41.39%	2,381	58.27%	14	0.34%	-690	-16.89%	4,086
Lafayette	14,050	60.02%	8,956	38.26%	403	1.72%	5,094	21.76%	23,409
Lamar	20,775	73.75%	7,038	24.98%	358	1.27%	13,737	48.76%	28,171
Lauderdale	16,487	60.16%	10,677	38.96%	243	0.89%	5,810	21.20%	27,407
Lawrence	4,113	67.95%	1,899	31.37%	41	0.68%	2,214	36.58%	6,053
Leake	5,143	61.37%	3,182	37.97%	55	0.66%	1,961	23.40%	8,380
Lee	24,339	68.87%	10,616	30.04%	383	1.08%	13,723	38.83%	35,338
Leflore	2,854	30.29%	6,476	68.74%	91	0.97%	-3,622	-38.45%	9,421
Lincoln	11,432	72.35%	4,262	26.97%	108	0.68%	7,170	45.37%	15,802
Lowndes	13,087	53.58%	11,096	45.43%	243	0.99%	1,991	8.15%	24,426
Madison	32,333	58.04%	22,700	40.75%	677	1.22%	9,633	17.29%	55,710
Marion	7,874	70.38%	3,215	28.74%	99	0.88%	4,659	41.64%	11,188
Marshall	7,977	53.24%	6,888	45.97%	118	0.79%	1,089	7.27%	14,983
Monroe	10,861	67.59%	5,090	31.68%	118	0.73%	5,771	35.91%	16,069
Montgomery	2,658	60.08%	1,737	39.26%	29	0.66%	921	20.82%	4,424
Neshoba	8,154	75.08%	2,622	24.14%	85	0.78%	5,532	50.93%	10,861
Newton	6,641	71.23%	2,603	27.92%	79	0.85%	4,038	43.31%	9,323
Noxubee	1,151	25.87%	3,269	73.48%	29	0.65%	-2,118	-47.61%	4,449
Oktibbeha	8,901	49.31%	8,851	49.03%	299	1.66%	50	0.28%	18,051
Panola	8,202	56.87%	6,061	42.03%	159	1.10%	2,141	14.85%	14,422
Pearl River	20,438	82.84%	3,982	16.14%	251	1.02%	16,456	66.70%	24,671
Perry	4,425	79.89%	1,078	19.46%	36	0.65%	3,347	60.43%	5,539
Pike	7,943	51.29%	7,402	47.80%	140	0.90%	541	3.49%	15,485
Pontotoc	11,740	83.45%	2,214	15.74%	114	0.81%	9,526	67.71%	14,068
Prentiss	8,581	82.66%	1,727	16.64%	73	0.70%	6,854	66.02%	10,381
Quitman	902	33.69%	1,725	64.44%	50	1.87%	-823	-30.74%	2,677
Rankin	50,896	73.04%	18,060	25.92%	722	1.04%	32,836	47.13%	69,678
Scott	6,098	61.65%	3,729	37.70%	64	0.65%	2,369	23.95%	9,891
Sharkey	551	31.20%	1,201	68.01%	14	0.79%	-650	-36.81%	1,766
Simpson	7,552	68.07%	3,479	31.36%	63	0.57%	4,073	36.71%	11,094
Smith	6,146	80.07%	1,486	19.36%	44	0.57%	4,660	60.71%	7,676
Stone	6,214	78.47%	1,620	20.46%	85	1.07%	4,594	58.01%	7,919
Sunflower	2,515	31.93%	5,312	67.45%	49	0.62%	-2,797	-35.51%	7,876
Tallahatchie	2,333	46.55%	2,630	52.47%	49	0.98%	-297	-5.93%	5,012
Tate	9,185	71.42%	3,555	27.64%	121	0.94%	5,630	43.78%	12,861
Tippah	7,984	83.24%	1,547	16.13%	60	0.63%	6,437	67.12%	9,591
Tishomingo	8,064	89.10%	921	10.18%	65	0.72%	7,143	78.93%	9,050
Tunica	799	29.95%	1,837	68.85%	32	1.20%	-1,038	-38.91%	2,668
Union	10,559	84.62%	1,807	14.48%	112	0.90%	8,752	70.14%	12,478
Walthall	4,114	63.01%	2,355	36.07%	60	0.92%	1,759	26.94%	6,529
Warren	9,407	51.41%	8,683	47.45%	208	1.14%	724	3.96%	18,298
Washington	4,649	31.97%	9,735	66.95%	156	1.07%	-5,086	-34.98%	14,540
Wayne	6,013	65.94%	3,028	33.21%	78	0.86%	2,985	32.73%	9,119
Webster	4,195	82.34%	872	17.11%	28	0.55%	3,323	65.22%	5,095
Wilkinson	1,075	36.68%	1,817	61.99%	39	1.33%	-742	-25.32%	2,931
Winston	4,922	58.71%	3,392	40.46%	70	0.83%	1,530	18.25%	8,384
Yalobusha	3,518	59.85%	2,289	38.94%	71	1.21%	1,229	20.91%	5,878
Yazoo	4,558	50.81%	4,342	48.40%	71	0.79%	216	2.41%	8,971
Totals	747,744	60.89%	466,668	38.00%	13,596	1.11%	281,076	22.89%	1,228,008

Counties that flipped from Democratic to Republican

- Copiah (largest city: Crystal Springs)
- Issaquena (largest city: Mayersville)
- Jasper (largest city: Bay Springs)
- Marshall (largest city: Holly Springs)
- Oktibbeha (largest city: Starkville)
- Pike (largest city: McComb)
- Warren (largest city: Vicksburg)
- Yazoo (largest city: Yazoo City)

==== By congressional district ====
Trump won three of four congressional districts.

District	Trump	Harris	Representative
1st	67.85%	30.82%	Trent Kelly
2nd	39.29%	59.67%	Bennie Thompson
3rd	64.12%	34.91%	Michael Guest
4th	70.73%	28.19%	Mike Ezell

== Analysis ==
Though Mississippi has voted to the left of its bordering states in recent presidential elections, owing mainly to its large African-American minority, the state is located in the Deep South and therefore the Bible Belt. One of the most socially conservative states in the nation, it has not been won by a Democratic presidential candidate since Southerner Jimmy Carter's narrow statewide victory in 1976, nor has it been competitive at this level since Bill Clinton of neighboring Arkansas fell five points short of carrying the state in 1996.

Trump received 60.9% of the vote in Mississippi, winning the state by a 22.9% margin. Harris received 15% fewer total votes than Biden did, in large part with a decline in turnout from black majority counties in the Mississippi Delta. Collectively, these counties saw an 8% drop in turnout compared to 2020. Trump flipped the majority black counties of Copiah, Issaquena, Jasper, Pike, Warren, and Yazoo, as well as Marshall and Oktibbeha counties.

Copiah, Oktibbeha, Pike, and Yazoo counties last backed a Republican for president in 2004, Issaquena County in 1984, Jasper County in 2000, and Marshall County in 1972. Meanwhile, Warren County continued its bellwether streak going back to 2012. Turnout noticeably fell, with Harris receiving more than 70,000 fewer votes than Biden, and fewer raw votes than Hillary Clinton in 2016. Mississippi was one of three states, along with Louisiana and Illinois, where Harris received fewer votes than Clinton.

Despite their poor performance in Mississippi in this election, Democrats saw a resurgence two years later with Scott Colom's unexpected U.S. Senate victory in the state.

== See also ==
- United States presidential elections in Mississippi
- 2024 United States presidential election
- 2024 Democratic Party presidential primaries
- 2024 Republican Party presidential primaries
- 2024 United States Senate election in Mississippi
- 2024 United States elections

== Notes ==
Partisan clients
