= Caseyville, Mississippi =

- Unincorporated community
- Location within Mississippi Location within the United States
- Coordinates: 31°40′23″N 90°39′20″W
- Country: United States
- State: Mississippi
- County: Lincoln
- Elevation: 459 ft (140 m)
- Time zone: UTC-6 (Central (CST))
  - Summer (DST): UTC-5 (CDT)
- Area codes: 601 & 769
- GNIS feature ID: 692851

Caseyville is an unincorporated community in Lincoln County, Mississippi, United States.

The community was first settled in the early 1800s by Scottish Presbyterians. The community is named for James Casey, who settled in the area in the 1850s and operated one of its first stores.

A post office operated under the name Caseyville from 1852 to 1909.
