= Kirkville, Pike County, Mississippi =

Unincorporated community in Mississippi, US

Kirkville, Mississippi
- Unincorporated community
- Location within Mississippi Location within the United States
- Coordinates: 31°12′48″N 90°29′49″W
- Country: United States
- State: Mississippi
- County: Pike
- Elevation: 440 ft (130 m)
- Time zone: UTC-6 (Central (CST))
  - Summer (DST): UTC-5 (CDT)
- Area codes: 601 & 769
- GNIS feature ID: 691986

Kirkville is an unincorporated community in Pike County, Mississippi, United States.
