= 1968 United States presidential election in Mississippi =

- November 5, 1968

Nominee	George Wallace	Hubert Humphrey	Richard Nixon
Party	Independent	Democratic	Republican
Alliance	American Independent
Home state	Alabama	Minnesota	New York (Note: Although he was born in California and he served as a U.S. senator from California, in 1968 Richard Nixon's official state of residence was New York, because he moved there to practice law after his defeat in the 1962 California gubernatorial election. During his first term as president, Nixon re-established his residency in California. Consequently, most reliable reference books list Nixon's home state as New York in the 1968 election and his home state as California in the 1972 (and 1960) election.)
Running mate	Curtis LeMay (Note: The independent electors were originally pledged to vice presidential candidate S. Marvin Griffin, but they cast their vice presidential ballots for national nominee Curtis LeMay.)	Edmund Muskie	Spiro Agnew
Electoral vote	7	0	0
Popular vote	415,349	150,644	88,516
Percentage	63.46%	23.02%	13.52%

Wallace
40–50%
50–60%
60–70%
70–80%
80–90%
90–100%
Humphrey
40–50%
50–60%
60–70%
President before election
Lyndon B. Johnson
Democratic
Elected President
Richard Nixon
Republican

The 1968 United States presidential election in Mississippi was held on November 5, 1968. Mississippi voters chose seven electors, or representatives to the Electoral College, who voted for president and vice president.

During the 1960s, the Civil Rights Movement dictated Mississippi's politics, with effectively the entire white population vehemently opposed to federal policies of racial desegregation and black voting rights. In 1960, the state had been narrowly captured by a slate of unpledged Democratic electors, (Note: These unpledged electors supported Virginia Senator Harry F. Byrd for president and South Carolina Senator Strom Thurmond for vice president.) but in 1964, universal white opposition to the Civil Rights Act and negligible black voter registration (Note: Over the whole of Mississippi it is estimated that at the time of the 1964 presidential election between six and seven percent of the black population was registered to vote, and that about three-quarters of these – totalling twenty-one thousand blacks – actually voted in the 1964 presidential election, giving Lyndon Johnson about 40 percent of his fifty-two thousand statewide votes. However, in most rural counties, black registration was zero before the Voting Rights Act and had been since the Constitution of 1890.) meant that white Mississippians turned almost unanimously to Republican Barry Goldwater (apart from a small number in the northeast of the state opposed to Goldwater's strong fiscal conservatism). Goldwater's support for "constitutional government and local self-rule" meant that the absence from the ballot of "states' rights" parties or unpledged electors was unimportant. The Arizona senator was one of only six Republicans to vote against the Civil Rights Act, and so the small electorate of Mississippi supported him almost unanimously.

Following the passage of the Voting Rights Act of 1965, federal examiners registered black Mississippians as voters in large numbers: African American registration rose from under seven percent to over fifty-nine percent between mid-1965 and 1968. Extreme anger ensued among white Mississippians, because black voting in significant numbers would threaten the entire social fabric of the Black Belt, and was even feared by the few upcountry whites who had stayed loyal to Johnson. The anger of Mississippi's whites was seen in the 1967 Democratic gubernatorial primary, when both Black Belt whites and their traditional foes in the upcountry supported conservative John Bell Williams against William Winter, whom it was believed was favored by the newly registered black voters, although no politician in the state would then openly pursue black support.

In addition, the Twenty-Fourth Amendment and resultant abolition of Mississippi's poll tax had allowed large increases in both white and black voter registration, with some of these drives run by white supremacist groups such as the Ku Klux Klan. Consequently, when segregationist former and future Alabama Governor George Wallace announced in early 1968 that he would mount a third-party candidacy for the presidency, he had a powerful base in the Deep South. Meanwhile, the Republican Party, under new RNC Chairman Ray C. Bliss, had of necessity moved away from the strident conservatism of Goldwater.

Given Wallace's reputation on racial issues, it was inevitable that he would be endorsed by Mississippi's established Democratic Party leadership, and this happened in September. William Winter, the losing candidate for governor the previous year, did support Democratic nominee Hubert Humphrey, but knew that it would be too risky to actively campaign for him. By August, it was widely accepted that Wallace would carry Mississippi by a large margin, as apart from a small number of wealthy urban communities he had captured a virtual monopoly of the state's white electorate. Wallace was the only candidate to campaign in the state. Nixon only received 13% of the vote, making Mississippi his worst state in the election. Among white voters, 83% supported Wallace, 17% supported Nixon, and 0% supported Humphrey.

== Predictions ==
The following newspapers gave these predictions about how Mississippi would vote in the 1968 presidential election:

Source	Ranking	As of
Fort Worth Star-Telegram	Safe I (Flip)	September 14, 1968
Pensacola News Journal	Safe I (Flip)	September 23, 1968
Daily Press	Certain I (flip)	October 11, 1968
The Charlotte News	Certain I (Flip)	October 12, 1968
The Record	Likely I (Flip)	October 21, 1968
Shreveport Times	Safe I (Flip)	November 3, 1968
The Selma Times-Journal	Safe I (Flip)	November 3, 1968
Fort Lauderdale News	Safe I (Flip)	November 4, 1968

== Results ==
1968 United States presidential election in Mississippi
Party	Candidate	Votes	Percentage	Electoral votes
American Independent	George C. Wallace	415,349	63.46%	7
Democratic	Hubert Humphrey	150,644	23.02%	0
Republican	Richard Nixon	88,516	13.52%	0
Totals		654,509	100.00%	7
Voter turnout (voting age/registered voters)				53%/84%

=== Results by county ===
County	George Wallace American Independent		Hubert Humphrey Democratic		Richard Nixon Republican		Margin		Total votes cast
County	#	%	#	%	#	%	#	%	Total votes cast
Adams	6,812	50.46%	5,214	38.62%	1,475	10.93%	1,598	11.84%	13,501
Alcorn	6,304	68.63%	1,122	12.21%	1,760	19.16%	4,544 (Note: In this county where Nixon ran second ahead of Humphrey, margin given is Wallace vote minus Nixon vote and percentage margin is Wallace percentage minus Nixon percentage.)	49.47%	9,186
Amite	3,206	62.47%	1,533	29.87%	393	7.66%	1,673	32.60%	5,132
Attala	4,776	68.59%	1,588	22.81%	599	8.60%	3,188	45.78%	6,963
Benton	1,630	61.16%	850	31.89%	185	6.94%	780	29.27%	2,665
Bolivar	5,018	43.62%	4,696	40.82%	1,790	15.56%	322	2.80%	11,504
Calhoun	4,823	87.80%	276	5.02%	394	7.17%	4,429	80.63%	5,493
Carroll	2,131	66.72%	925	28.96%	138	4.32%	1,206	37.76%	3,194
Chickasaw	4,062	78.68%	720	13.95%	381	7.38%	3,342	64.73%	5,163
Choctaw	2,543	80.20%	417	13.15%	211	6.65%	2,126	67.05%	3,171
Claiborne	1,143	32.64%	2,129	60.79%	230	6.57%	-986	-28.15%	3,502
Clarke	4,214	78.18%	878	16.29%	298	5.53%	3,336	61.89%	5,390
Clay	3,505	63.62%	1,510	27.41%	494	8.97%	1,995	36.21%	5,509
Coahoma	3,671	33.69%	5,352	49.11%	1,875	17.20%	-1,681	-15.42%	10,898
Copiah	4,951	59.09%	2,724	32.51%	704	8.40%	2,227	26.58%	8,379
Covington	3,668	76.35%	691	14.38%	445	9.26%	2,977	61.97%	4,804
DeSoto	5,346	64.13%	1,898	22.77%	1,092	13.10%	3,448	41.36%	8,336
Forrest	9,975	61.48%	2,957	18.22%	3,294	20.30%	6,681	41.18%	16,226
Franklin	2,429	70.57%	782	22.72%	231	6.71%	1,647	47.85%	3,442
George	3,992	91.20%	214	4.89%	171	3.91%	3,778	86.31%	4,377
Greene	2,744	82.53%	449	13.50%	132	3.97%	2,295	69.03%	3,325
Grenada	4,335	61.03%	2,050	28.86%	718	10.11%	2,285	32.17%	7,103
Hancock	4,072	67.41%	904	14.96%	1,065	17.63%	3,007	49.78%	6,041
Harrison	18,157	62.08%	4,549	15.55%	6,542	22.37%	11,615	39.71%	29,248
Hinds	32,366	53.29%	14,880	24.50%	13,488	22.21%	17,486	28.79%	60,734
Holmes	3,008	40.60%	3,881	52.38%	520	7.02%	-873	-11.78%	7,409
Humphreys	2,151	59.29%	1,219	33.60%	258	7.11%	932	25.69%	3,628
Issaquena	534	48.33%	527	47.69%	44	3.98%	7	0.64%	1,105
Itawamba	5,204	84.07%	417	6.74%	569	9.19%	4,635	74.88%	6,190
Jackson	15,261	74.67%	2,236	10.94%	2,942	14.39%	12,319	60.28%	20,439
Jasper	3,100	69.51%	987	22.13%	373	8.36%	2,113	47.38%	4,460
Jefferson	1,112	32.90%	2,121	62.75%	147	4.35%	-1,009	-29.85%	3,380
Jefferson Davis	2,614	59.73%	1,465	33.48%	297	6.79%	1,149	26.25%	4,376
Jones	12,276	68.22%	2,476	13.76%	3,242	18.02%	9,034	50.20%	17,994
Kemper	2,530	75.48%	655	19.54%	167	4.98%	1,875	55.94%	3,352
Lafayette	3,329	54.20%	1,578	25.69%	1,235	20.11%	1,751	28.51%	6,142
Lamar	4,422	83.14%	351	6.60%	546	10.27%	3,876	72.87%	5,319
Lauderdale	14,842	72.88%	3,195	15.69%	2,328	11.43%	11,647	57.19%	20,365
Lawrence	2,825	72.55%	740	19.00%	329	8.45%	2,085	53.55%	3,894
Leake	4,568	72.32%	1,295	20.50%	453	7.17%	3,273	51.82%	6,316
Lee	9,232	67.55%	1,912	13.99%	2,522	18.45%	6,710	49.10%	13,666
Leflore	5,732	49.28%	4,386	37.71%	1,514	13.02%	1,346	11.57%	11,632
Lincoln	7,276	73.36%	1,585	15.98%	1,057	10.66%	5,691	57.38%	9,918
Lowndes	6,829	61.94%	2,229	20.22%	1,968	17.85%	4,600	41.72%	11,026
Madison	4,071	43.02%	4,515	47.72%	876	9.26%	-444	-4.70%	9,462
Marion	5,848	70.18%	1,722	20.66%	763	9.16%	4,126	49.52%	8,333
Marshall	2,794	44.50%	2,907	46.30%	577	9.19%	-113	-1.80%	6,278
Monroe	7,856	74.61%	1,506	14.30%	1,167	11.08%	6,350	60.31%	10,529
Montgomery	2,988	68.55%	896	20.56%	475	10.90%	2,092	47.99%	4,359
Neshoba	6,417	82.11%	867	11.09%	531	6.79%	5,550	71.02%	7,815
Newton	5,561	80.57%	799	11.58%	542	7.85%	4,762	68.99%	6,902
Noxubee	2,040	55.75%	1,387	37.91%	232	6.34%	653	17.84%	3,659
Oktibbeha	4,127	57.09%	1,826	25.26%	1,276	17.65%	2,301	31.83%	7,229
Panola	4,133	51.83%	2,743	34.40%	1,098	13.77%	1,390	17.43%	7,974
Pearl River	6,050	73.12%	926	11.19%	1,298	15.69%	4,752	57.43%	8,274
Perry	2,541	79.23%	439	13.69%	227	7.08%	2,102	65.54%	3,207
Pike	5,846	57.57%	2,848	28.05%	1,460	14.38%	2,998	29.52%	10,154
Pontotoc	4,798	78.27%	599	9.77%	733	11.96%	4,065	66.31%	6,130
Prentiss	5,055	81.30%	440	7.08%	723	11.63%	4,332	69.67%	6,218
Quitman	2,443	55.79%	1,502	34.30%	434	9.91%	941	21.49%	4,379
Rankin	9,224	74.85%	1,975	16.03%	1,124	9.12%	7,249	58.82%	12,323
Scott	5,093	75.30%	1,067	15.77%	604	8.93%	4,026	59.53%	6,764
Sharkey	1,188	49.32%	972	40.35%	249	10.34%	216	8.97%	2,409
Simpson	5,064	72.16%	1,079	15.37%	875	12.47%	3,985	56.79%	7,018
Smith	4,367	84.70%	352	6.83%	437	8.48%	3,930	76.22%	5,156
Stone	2,140	78.91%	314	11.58%	258	9.51%	1,826	67.33%	2,712
Sunflower	3,932	51.94%	2,602	34.37%	1,036	13.69%	1,330	17.57%	7,570
Tallahatchie	3,076	59.96%	1,477	28.79%	577	11.25%	1,599	31.17%	5,130
Tate	2,810	61.39%	1,162	25.39%	605	13.22%	1,648	36.00%	4,577
Tippah	4,627	78.70%	663	11.28%	589	10.02%	3,964	67.42%	5,879
Tishomingo	4,569	82.41%	358	6.46%	617	11.13%	3,952	71.28%	5,544
Tunica	783	33.62%	1,133	48.65%	413	17.73%	-350	-15.03%	2,329
Union	5,198	76.78%	624	9.22%	948	14.00%	4,250	62.78%	6,770
Walthall	3,186	66.29%	1,233	25.66%	387	8.05%	1,953	40.63%	4,806
Warren	7,217	51.14%	4,503	31.91%	2,392	16.95%	2,714	19.23%	14,112
Washington	6,300	41.12%	5,520	36.03%	3,500	22.85%	780	5.09%	15,320
Wayne	4,089	80.57%	739	14.56%	247	4.87%	3,350	66.01%	5,075
Webster	3,398	84.46%	295	7.33%	330	8.20%	3,068	76.26%	4,023
Wilkinson	1,503	38.35%	2,144	54.71%	272	6.94%	-641	-16.36%	3,919
Winston	4,635	76.56%	911	15.05%	508	8.39%	3,724	61.51%	6,054
Yalobusha	2,725	65.50%	873	20.99%	562	13.51%	1,852	44.51%	4,160
Yazoo	4,939	61.28%	2,163	26.84%	958	11.89%	2,776	34.44%	8,060
Totals	415,349	63.46%	150,644	23.02%	88,516	13.52%	264,705	40.44%	654,509

==== Counties that flipped from Republican to American Independent ====
- Adams
- Bolivar
- Carroll
- Coahoma
- Covington
- Choctaw
- Clarke
- Desoto
- Forrest
- Franklin
- Grenada
- George
- Greene
- Hancock
- Humphreys
- Harrison
- Hinds
- Jackson
- Jones
- Lamar
- Lauderdale
- Marshall
- Lawrence
- Lincoln
- Lowndes
- Marion
- Neshoba
- Noxubee
- Newton
- Oktibbeha
- Quitman
- Sharkey
- Pearl River
- Perry
- Stone
- Tunica
- Wilkinson
- Wayne
- Webster
- Alcorn
- Amite
- Attala
- Benton
- Calhoun
- Chickasaw
- Clarke
- Clay
- Copiah
- Issaquena
- Itawamba
- Jasper
- Jefferson Davis
- Kemper
- Lafayette
- Leake
- Lee
- Leflore
- Madison
- Monroe
- Montgomery
- Panola
- Pike
- Pontotoc
- Prentiss
- Rankin
- Scott
- Simpson
- Smith
- Sunflower
- Tallahatchie
- Tate
- Tippah
- Tishomingo
- Union
- Walthall
- Washington
- Yalobusha
- Winston
- Warren
- Yazoo

==== Counties that flipped from Republican to Democratic ====
- Coahoma
- Madison
- Marshall
- Tunica
- Claiborne
- Jefferson

=== By congressional district ===
Wallace won all five congressional districts, all of which were held by Democrats. Wallace won every congressional district in Mississippi, which also happened in Alabama.

District	Wallace	Humphrey	Nixon	Representative
1st	60.4%	26.1%	13.6%	Thomas Abernethy
2nd	63.3%	22.9%	13.8%	Jamie Whitten
3rd	54.7%	29.6%	15.8%	Charles H. Griffin
4th	68.6%	22.5%	8.9%	Sonny Montgomery
5th	70.1%	14.7%	15.2%	William M. Colmer

== Analysis ==
This was the second presidential election in which Richard Nixon came in third place in Mississippi. Humphrey improved upon the support gained by Johnson, but this was entirely due to the huge increase in black voter registration – exit polls and later analysis suggest the national Democratic nominee received less than 3 percent of the white vote. In fact, so marked was the reversal of voting patterns from the previous five presidential elections that Humphrey did worst in the counties where Johnson, John F. Kennedy, Adlai Stevenson II and Harry S. Truman had run best.

With 63.46 percent of the popular vote, Mississippi was Wallace's second strongest state in the 1968 election after neighboring Alabama.

As of the 2024 presidential election, this is the last election in which the following counties did not vote for the Republican presidential candidate: Forrest, Lowndes, Lamar, Lauderdale, Lincoln, Newton, Rankin, Scott, Simpson, Harrison, Jackson, Choctaw, Jones, and Smith.

== Works cited ==
- Black, Earl; Black, Merle (1992). The Vital South: How Presidents Are Elected. Harvard University Press. ISBN 0674941306.
