= 1912 United States presidential election in Mississippi =

- November 5, 1912

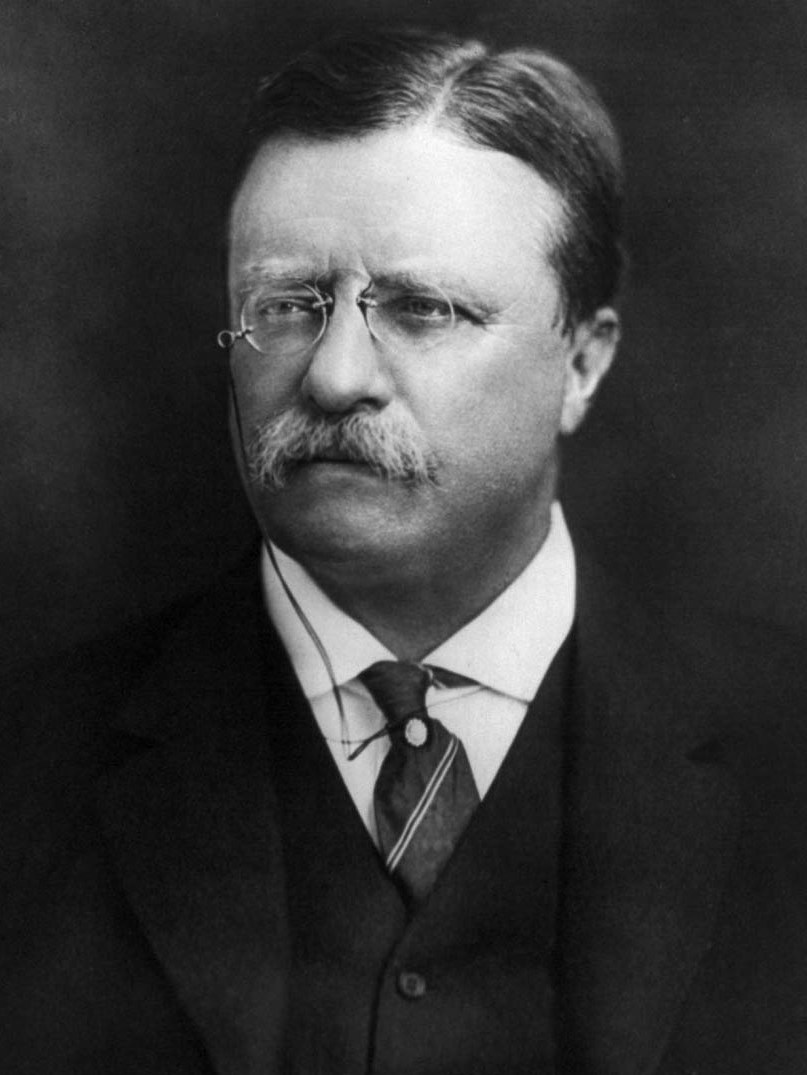
Nominee	Woodrow Wilson	Theodore Roosevelt
Party	Democratic	Progressive
Home state	New Jersey	New York
Running mate	Thomas R. Marshall	Hiram Johnson
Electoral vote	10	0
Popular vote	57,324	3,549
Percentage	88.90%	5.50%
County results
Wilson
60–70%
70–80%
80–90%
90–100%
President before election
William Howard Taft
Republican
Elected President
Woodrow Wilson
Democratic

The 1912 United States presidential election in Mississippi took place on November 5, 1912, as part of the 1912 United States presidential election. Mississippi voters chose ten representatives, or electors, to the Electoral College, who voted for president and vice president.

Mississippi was won by the Princeton University President Woodrow Wilson (D–Virginia), running with governor of Indiana Thomas R. Marshall, with 88.90% of the popular vote against the 26th president of the United States Theodore Roosevelt (P–New York), running with governor of California Hiram Johnson, with 5.50% of the popular vote.

Mississippi was one of the states in the 1912 United States presidential election where the sitting U.S. president William Howard Taft came in fourth place due to the hatred of the Republican Party in the south. Louisiana and neighboring Mississippi were the only two states that voted more Republican than they did in 1908.

== Results ==
1912 United States presidential election in Mississippi
Party	Candidate	Votes	%
Democratic	Woodrow Wilson	57,324	88.90%
Progressive	Theodore Roosevelt	3,549	5.50%
Socialist	Eugene V. Debs	2,050	3.18%
Republican	William Howard Taft (incumbent)	1,560	2.42%
Total votes		64,483	100%

== See also ==
- United States presidential elections in Mississippi
