= Mississippi Highway 44 =

State Highway in Mississippi

Mississippi Highway 44

Route information
- Maintained by MDOT
- Length: 48.6 mi (78.2 km)
- Existed: 1949–present

Western segment
- Length: 25.9 mi (41.7 km)
- West end: US 51 / MS 570 in McComb
- Major intersections: MS 583 between Enon and Bristers Store
- East end: MS 27 near Topeka

Pearl River Bridge segment
- Length: 5.5 mi (8.9 km)
- West end: MS 587 near Morgantown
- East end: MS 13 in Goss

Eastern segment
- Length: 17.2 mi (27.7 km)
- West end: US 98 in Columbia
- East end: MS 42 near Sumrall

Location
- Country: United States
- State: Mississippi
- Counties: Pike, Walthall, Lawrence, Marion, Lawrence

Highway system
- Mississippi State Highway System; Interstate; US; State
← MS 43A	→ US 45

Mississippi Highway 44 (MS 44) is a 48.6-mile-long (78.2 km) disconnected state highway comprising three segments in south-central Mississippi.

The first, and longest, section runs from U.S. Highway 51 (US 51) in McComb to MS 27 near Topeka. The second, and shortest, section consists of a newly built bridge across the Pearl River between MS 587 (Near Morgantown) and MS 13 in Goss. The third and final section runs between US 98 in Columbia and MS 42 just west of Sumrall.

== Route description ==
=== Western segment ===
MS 44 begins in Pike County in downtown McComb, running concurrently with MS 570, at an intersection with US 51 (Broadway). It heads east to cross a bridge over railroad tracks and pass through neighborhoods along Pearl River Avenue, a divided two-lane street, to an intersection with Locust Street, where MS 570 breaks off and heads north. The highway now narrows to a regular two-lane and leaves McComb to pass northeast through rural areas for the next several miles. MS 44 crosses Bogue Chitto and Topisaw Creek before passing through Pricedale and crossing into Walthall County. It now comes to the Enon community, where it becomes concurrent MS 583 for a few miles, before breaking off at Bristers Store and crossing into Lawrence County. MS 44 passes through the Jayess community, where the highway meets a couple of roads leading to the nearby community of Topeka, before coming to an end at an intersection with MS 27 between Tylertown and Monticello.

=== Pearl River Bridge segment ===
MS 44 begins at an intersection with MS 587 a few miles north of Morgantown and immediately goes through a switchback curve before crossing a short overpass over MS 587 (This is an incomplete/future interchange). It heads east as a two-lane highway through wooded areas to cross the newly completed (in 2010) one-mile-long (1.6 km) bridge over the Pearl River. This is the only bridge across the river between the towns of Monticello and Columbia. The highway continues east through wooded areas for a couple miles before coming to an end at an intersection with MS 13 in the community of Goss.

This entire section of MS 44 lies within Marion County.

Future plans call for this section of MS 44 to be extended westward from MS 587 to an intersection with MS 27 near Jayess, which would connect it to the western segment of MS 44.

=== Eastern segment ===
MS 44 begins in Marion County at an intersection with US 98 at the eastern edge of the Columbia city limits. It heads north along a recently completed two-lane eastern bypass of the city, which is a little over a mile long, to an intersection with Sumrall Road, the former routing of MS 44 through downtown. MS 44 now leaves Columbia and heads northeast through a mix of rural farmland and woodlands for several miles to cross into Lamar County. The highway comes to an end shortly thereafter at an intersection with MS 42 just west of the town of Sumrall.

== Major intersections ==
County	Location	mi	km	Destinations	Notes
Pike	McComb	0.0	0.0	US 51 / MS 570 west (Broadway) – Summit, Magnolia	Western end of MS 570 concurrency; western terminus of western segment
Pike	McComb	0.9	1.4	MS 570 east (N Locust Street) – Southwest Mississippi Community College, Ruth; S Locust Street; To US 98	Eastern end of MS 570 concurrency
Walthall	Enon	15.2	24.5	MS 583 south – Tylertown	Western end of MS 583 concurrency
Walthall	Bristers Store	18.2	29.3	MS 583 north – Brookhaven	Eastern end of MS 583 concurrency
Lawrence	Jayess	20.8	33.5	Topeka-Jayess Road - Topeka	
Lawrence		25.0	40.2	Bismark Road - Topeka	
Lawrence		25.9	41.7	MS 27 – Monticello, Tylertown	Eastern terminus of western segment
Gap in route
Marion		0.0	0.0	MS 587 – Monticello, Morgantown	Western terminus of Pearl River Bridge segment
Marion	Goss	5.5	8.9	MS 13 – Columbia, Prentiss	Eastern terminus of Pearl River Bridge segment
Marion	Gap in route				
Marion	Columbia	0.0	0.0	US 98 – Foxworth, Hattiesburg	Western terminus of eastern segment
Marion	Columbia	1.3	2.1	Sumrall Road; To MS 198 – Downtown	Old MS 44
Lamar		17.2	27.7	MS 42 – Sumrall, Bassfield	Eastern terminus of eastern segment
1.000 mi = 1.609 km; 1.000 km = 0.621 mi: Concurrency terminus
