= Mississippi Highway 184 =

State Highway in Mississippi

Mississippi Highway 184

Route information
- Auxiliary route of US 84
- Maintained by MDOT
- Length: 38.970 mi (62.716 km)

Location
- Country: United States
- State: Mississippi

Highway system
- Mississippi State Highway System; Interstate; US; State
← MS 182	→ MS 198

Mississippi Highway 184 (MS 184) is an east–west state highway in the U.S. state of Mississippi. It is a non-continuous highway, composed of segments from the previous path of U.S. Highway 84 (US 84) that have been displaced by new construction.

Most of the segments of MS 184 serve as business routes, providing access from US 84 to towns where they are located.

MS 184 consists of nine sections that all connect with US 84 in the towns of Waynesboro, near Laurel, Collins, Prentiss, Silver Creek, Monticello, Brookhaven, Bude, and Meadville.

== Major intersections ==
County	Location	mi	km	Destinations	Notes
Franklin		0.000	0.000	US 84 – Natchez, Brookhaven	Western terminus
Franklin	Meadville	1.346– 1.408	2.166– 2.266	MS 556 east – Summit	Western terminus of MS 556
Franklin	Bude	2.415– 2.772	3.887– 4.461	US 84 / US 98 begins – Natchez, Brookhaven	Interchange; western terminus of US 98; western end of US 98 concurrency
Franklin	Bude	3.341	5.377	US 98 east – Summit, McComb	Eastern end of US 98 concurrency
Franklin	Bude	4.779	7.691	US 84 to I-55 – Natchez, Roxie, Brookhaven	Eastern terminus
Gap in route
Lincoln				US 84 to I-55 – Meadville, Bude, Monticello	Western terminus
Lincoln	Brookhaven			US 51 south – Bogue Chitto, McComb	Western end of US 51 concurrency
Lincoln	Brookhaven	Gap in route			
Lincoln	Brookhaven			MS 550 west (Schwem Avenue) / Turnbough Avenue / West Monticello Street – Union Church	Eastern terminus of MS 550
Lincoln	Brookhaven			Brookway Boulevard (MS 558 west) to I-55	Eastern terminus of MS 558
Lincoln	Brookhaven			MS 583 south (S 1st Street) – Ruth	Northern terminus of MS 583
Lincoln				US 84 – Meadville, Bude, Monticello	Eastern terminus
Gap in route
Lawrence				US 84 – Brookhaven, Silver Creek, Prentiss	Western terminus
Lawrence	Monticello			MS 27 – Tylertown, Georgetown	
Lawrence	Monticello			MS 587 south (Robinwood Road) – Morgantown	Northern terminus of MS 587
Lawrence				MS 43 south (Arm Road) – Columbia	West end of MS 43 concurrency
Lawrence				US 84 / MS 43 north – Brookhaven, Silver Creek, Prentiss	Eastern terminus
Lawrence	Gap in route				
Lawrence				US 84 / MS 43 south – Monticello, Prentiss	Western terminus; west end of MS 43 concurrency
Lawrence	Silver Creek			MS 43 north / MS 43A south (Front Street) – New Hebron, Monticello	East end of MS 43 concurrency; northern terminus of MS 43A
Lawrence				US 84 – Monticello, Prentiss	Eastern terminus
Gap in route
Jefferson Davis				US 84 – Monticello, Silver Creek, Collins	Western terminus
Jefferson Davis				Airport Road – Prentiss-Jefferson Davis County Airport	Access road into airport
Jefferson Davis	Prentiss			MS 13 south (Columbia Avenue) / MS 937 north – Columbia	Western end of MS 13 concurrency; southern terminus of MS 937
Jefferson Davis	Prentiss			MS 42 – New Hebron, Downtown, Carson	
Jefferson Davis	Prentiss			MS 13 north to US 84 – Mendenhall	Eastern end of MS 13 concurrency
Jefferson Davis				Dead End at US 84	Eastern terminus; no access to US 84
Gap in route
Covington				US 84 – Prentiss, Laurel	Western terminus
Covington	Collins	1.543– 1.765	2.483– 2.840	US 49 – Jackson, Hattiesburg	Interchange
Covington				US 84 – Prentiss, Laurel	Eastern terminus
Gap in route
Jones				US 84 – Laurel, Waynesboro	Western terminus
Jones				US 84 – Laurel, Waynesboro	Eastern terminus
Gap in route
Wayne				US 84 – Laurel, Silas, AL	Western terminus
Wayne	Waynesboro			MS 63 south (Turner Street) – Leakesville	Northern terminus of MS 63
Wayne	Waynesboro			MS 145 (Mississippi Drive)	
Wayne	Waynesboro			US 45 – State Line, Shubuta, Quitman	
Wayne	Waynesboro			Dead End at US 84	Eastern terminus
1.000 mi = 1.609 km; 1.000 km = 0.621 mi: Concurrency terminus; Incomplete access
