= 2025 Kentwood–Carson tornado =

EF4 tornado in Mississippi, U.S.

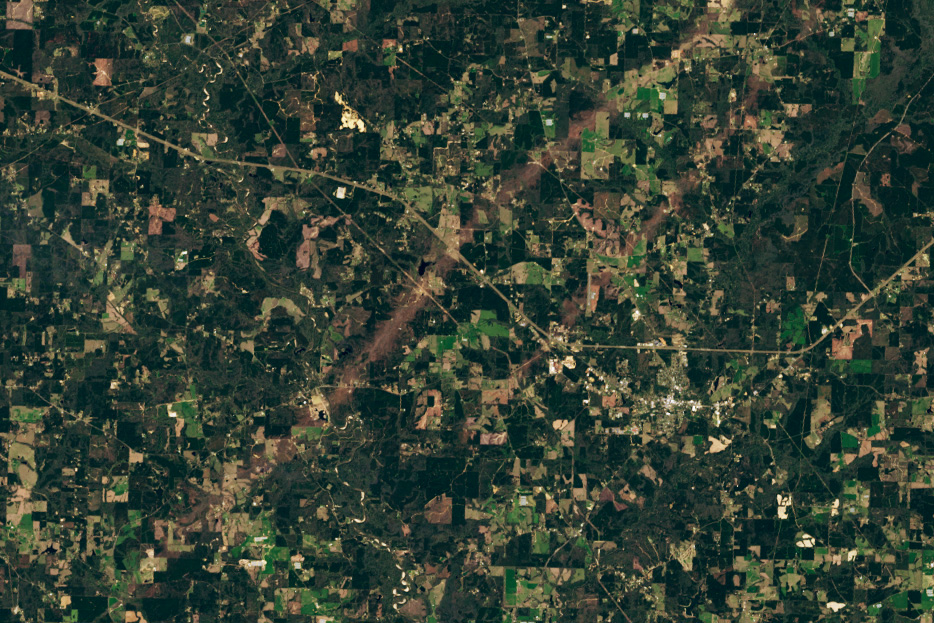
- Clockwise from the top: The tornado near Tylertown; SPC mesoscale discussion of the tornado as it was ongoing; two tornado scars near Tylertown, with the left one being the EF4 tornado

Meteorological history
- Formed: March 15, 2025, 12:17 p.m. CDT (UTC–05:00)
- Dissipated: March 15, 2025, 1:39 p.m. CDT (UTC–05:00)
- Duration: 1 hour, 22 minutes

EF4 tornado
- on the Enhanced Fujita scale
- Max width: 1,400 yards (0.80 mi; 1.3 km)
- Path length: 67.16 miles (108.08 km)
- Highest winds: 170 mph (270 km/h)

Overall effects
- Fatalities: 6
- Injuries: 14
- Damage: >$5.5 million (2025 USD)
- Areas affected: Tangipahoa Parish, Louisiana and Southern Mississippi, especially Walthall County
- Part of the Tornado outbreak of March 14–16, 2025 and Tornadoes of 2025

During the early afternoon hours of March 15, 2025, a large, violent, and deadly EF4 tornado devastated areas in and around the Mississippi communities of Tylertown, Salem, Society Hill, and Carson, causing severe damage in multiple areas. Over the course of 1 hour and 20 minutes, the tornado, sometimes known as either the Kentwood–Carson tornado or informally the Kentwood, LA to Darbun, MS Tornado by the National Weather Service (NWS), or also commonly referred to as the Tylertown Tornado killed six people and injured at least 14 along a path 67.16 miles (108.08 km) long. It was part of a larger tornado outbreak spanning from March 14–16, 2025, and the third of eight tornadoes to be rated EF4/F4 or higher during the year of 2025, with the NWS offices in New Orleans/Baton Rouge, Louisiana and Jackson, Mississippi observing that the tornado attained maximum winds of 170 mph (270 km/h), giving it a rating of low-end EF4 on the Enhanced Fujita scale.

The tornado began in Tangipahoa Parish, Louisiana at 12:17 p.m. CDT, causing EF1 damage to trees and structures before entering Pike County, Mississippi. There, the tornado caused widespread tree damage, damaged outbuildings and houses, and blew away manufactured homes, reaching EF2 intensity as it approached and entered Walthall County, upon which the tornado struck the Paradise Ranch RV resort, destroying all of its cabins and over 200 campsites. Passing to the northwest of Tylertown, the tornado rapidly intensified and briefly reached EF4 intensity as it destroyed a well-built two story home and obliterated multiple manufactured homes nearby. Continuing northeastwards, the tornado fluctuated between EF2-EF3 intensity, continuing to cause widespread tree damage and more isolated damage to structures, killing three people to the northwest of Darbun before entering Marion County. There, the tornado damaged or destroyed numerous homes and caused major tree damage, striking the Whitebluff area at EF3 intensity and entering Jefferson Davis County shortly thereafter, where it damaged or destroyed multiple structures, including a manufactured home in which two more people were killed. Continuing into Covington County, the tornado damaged trees and structures, including a well-built wood home that received an EF4 rating as it shrank and occluded. The tornado dissipated at 1:39 p.m. CDT to the southwest of Collins. As the tornado was ongoing, a separate EF3 tornado formed and moved a nearly identical path through parts of Walthall and Marion counties, adding to the damages and causing an additional fatality.

Immediately following the tornado, recovery efforts were intensive, but many of the areas affected were left without disaster relief for months following the storm. Walthall County alone spent around $700,000 (2025 USD) on cleanup efforts alone, but were forced to cease their operations for over a month as the county could not afford to spend anymore without assurance that it would receive federal reimbursement under a disaster declaration. Multiple other Mississippi counties were left without federal aid for over two months following the storms.

== Meteorological synopsis ==
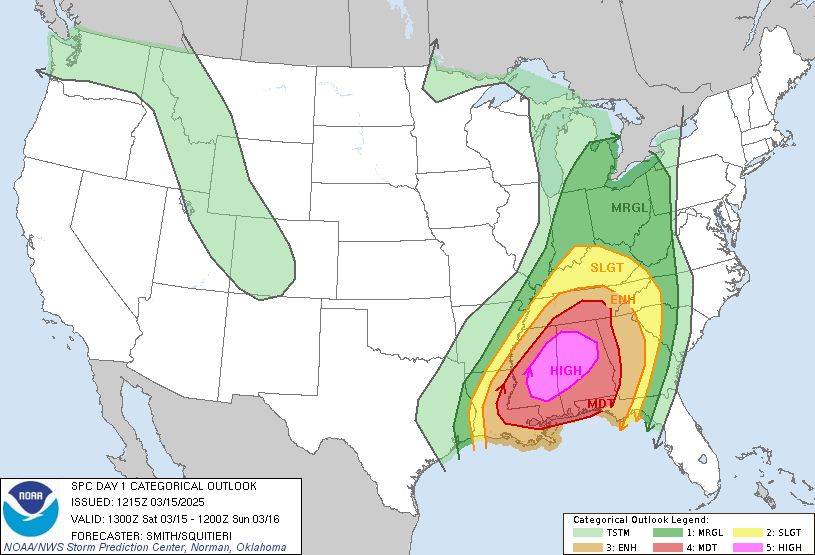
The Storm Prediction Center Day 1 convective outlook issued March 15, 2025 at 1300Z, indicating a high risk for severe weather across parts of Mississippi and Alabama.

As early as March 7, 2025, the Storm Prediction Center (SPC) began to monitor the imminent threat of severe weather brought on by a large-scale trough ejection over parts of the High Plains and Upper Midwest, though, by that point, the large spread in possible outcomes represented in numerical weather prediction computer models prevented the SPC from designating a specific area at risk. By March 9, two 15% risks for severe weather had been outlined, the first situated over the Mississippi Valley pending severe weather on March 14, and the second in the Southern United States for a second round of severe weather on March 15. The following day, both areas were upgraded to a 30% risk for severe weather as multiple weather forecast models agreed on increasing threats of hail, wind, and tornadoes, including a supercell-focused mode with the potential to evolve into a QLCS threat. On March 11, an outlook described the March 14 system as "anomalously intense upper cyclone", with a second upper-level trough expected to produce another round of severe weather on March 15.

On March 13, the SPC upgraded the risk for March 14 into a moderate risk over parts of the Middle Mississippi Valley, including much of Illinois and Missouri, alongside small parts of Iowa, Kentucky, Arkansas, and Tennessee. This risk was described as a "regional outbreak of severe storms", driven by the risk of storms producing swaths of damaging winds potentially in excess of 65 knots (75 mph; 120 km/h) over the region, with areas further south expected to be conducive to the development of strong tornadoes later in the day. The outlook for March 15 was also upgraded to a moderate risk as an environment more conducive for significant tornadoes as favorable wind profiles alongside moderate instability produced the conditions necessary for "robust updrafts and intense supercells". A conditional risk was also highlighted further north into Ohio and Kentucky, which were expected to face a primarily non-severe event, reliant on the intensity of convection further south that could stabilize the atmosphere. That same day, as the system moved through the West Coast, it spawned a high-end EF0 tornado in the Los Angeles area.

At the 1730Z Day 2 outlook on March 14, the SPC outlined a tornado-driven high risk over parts of Mississippi and Alabama pending severe weather on March 15. This was just the third time that the Storm Prediction Center had issued a high risk as early as a Day 2 outlook since 2006, the prior two occurring on April 7, 2006 and April 14, 2012.

On March 15, a large warm sector had developed over many of the Gulf Coast states, producing widespread dew points near 70 °F (21 °C). That morning, storms had begun to fire and develop across the northern edge of the area of elevated moisture. Temperatures to the south and east of these storms were expected to rise to 75–80 °F (24–27 °C), with multiple bands of convection expected to initiate between 12 and 2 p.m. CDT. Moderate levels of instability, ranging from 1500 to 2500 J/kg, and elongated hodographs, forecasted to produce 400–500 m^{2}/s^{2} storm-relative helicity in the first kilometer of the atmosphere, was expected to "favor the rapid development of intense supercells", and alongside strong Significant Tornado Parameter (STP) values of 5–10, were expected to produce numerous tornadoes, some of which could become long-tracked or violent as the day progressed further.

Further towards the north, the consolidation of storms was expected to bound stronger tornadoes to an area further south, with the northern structure highlighted as a potential area for bowing segments and embedded supercells across northern Alabama and south-central Tennessee, prompting the SPC to outline an area of higher wind risk over these areas. Across the vast majority of Georgia and western South Carolina and North Carolina, a weak, unstable air mass along with intense mid-level flow was expected to produce an environment capable of supporting supercell and line structures, with a risk highlighted for severe wind and tornadoes in the region. Storms that had initiated the previous day over the Ohio Valley were expected to continue eastwards as the day progressed, producing a risk for hail and wind, but as the day continued, forecasters noted the uncertainty of potential airmass recovery that could be conducive for a severe risk over Indiana and southern Michigan later that evening, with models showing weak instability below 500 J/kg that morning. Soundings from Louisiana and Mississippi indicated that the warm sector included steep lapse rates of 7–8 degrees Celsius from the 700–500 millibar (3,013–5,576 m, 9,882–18,289 ft) layer. A 125 kn (144 mph; 232 km/h) jet at 250 millibars (10,366 m, 33,999 ft) was expected to strengthen the region's wind profile, which, in conjunction with a lower-level jet moving eastwards throughout the day, produced an environment capable of all hazards, including the threat of strong tornadoes.

The high risk from the Day 2 outlook issued the previous day for March 15 continued into the Day 1 outlook, accompanied by a 30% hatched tornado risk encompassing east-central Mississippi and west-central Alabama. In the late morning hours, a PDS tornado watch was issued for parts of Louisiana and nearly all of Mississippi, and later, much of Alabama as a tornado outbreak featuring "significant tornadoes, some of which should be long-track and potentially violent," was expected to occur throughout the afternoon and evening hours.

== Tornado summary ==
=== Formation in Louisiana & track into Pike County, Mississippi ===
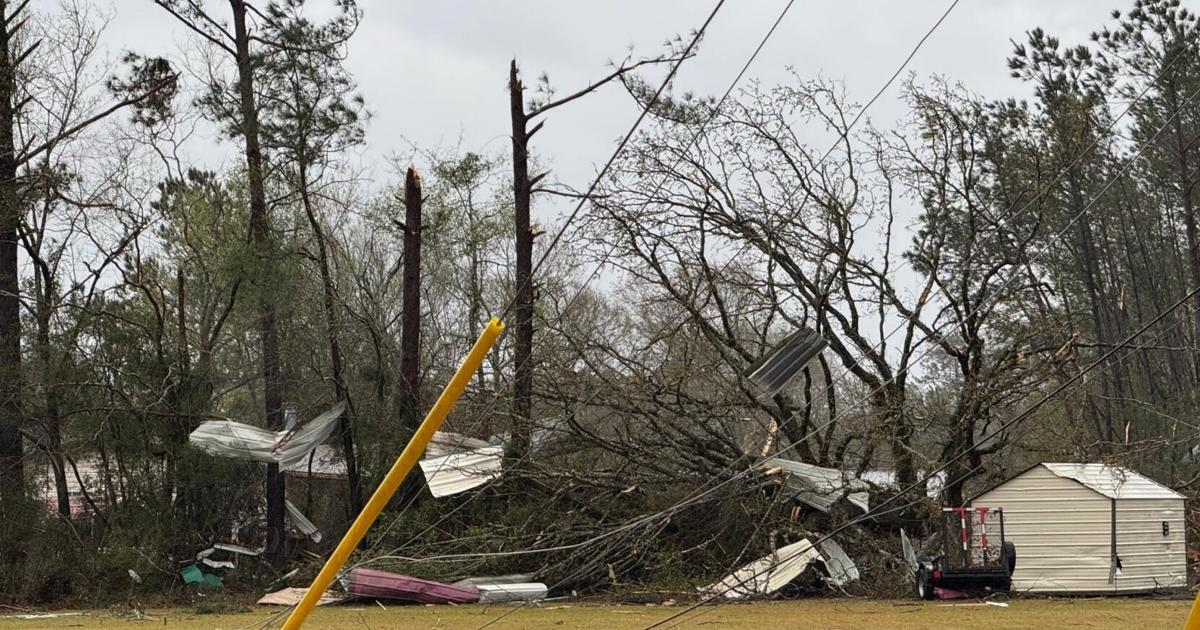
Damage near Kentwood following the tornado.

The tornado began at 12:17 p.m. CDT (UTC−05:00), just off of LA 38 and to the east of I-55, one mile to the east-northeast of Kentwood in Tangipahoa Parish, Louisiana. Moving northeastwards as it followed the Tangipahoa River, the tornado quickly strengthened to mid-range/high-end EF1 intensity, snapping and uprooting softwood trees. As it crossed North River Road, the tornado snapped large branches off of trees at EF0 intensity before strengthening back to EF1 intensity as it crossed Irving Branch, snapping and uprooting hardwood trees along North Hayes Road just to the east. The tornado crossed Irving Branch for a second time before crossing LA 1054/1055. There, the tornado began to widen and damaged an outbuilding, removing the majority of its roof and an exterior wall. Continuing northeastwards, the tornado followed Sanders Road, rolling or sliding multiple manufactured homes from their block piers, one of which was later found to be anchored. Another manufactured home had its roof removed, with sheet metal tangled in trees around the property, and wood poles in the area were snapped. As the tornado approached and crossed the Potts Road intersection, another manufactured home had its roof removed, exposing its wood framing, and an outbuilding lost some of its roof panels. The tornado weakened to EF0 intensity shortly thereafter, gradually shrinking in size as it continued towards the Mississippi border, causing minor tree damage observed from satellite imagery and causing roof damage to another house as it crossed J.W. Schilling Road, then State Line Road into Pike County, Mississippi.

Upon entering Mississippi, the tornado continued to cause minor tree damage, crossing McNabb Creek Road and Ed Brumfield Road before turning slightly towards the north-northeastwards. Strengthening to high-end EF1 intensity and widening substantially, the tornado snapped and uprooted softwood trees along Smith Alford Road as it approached the community of Progress. Moving through the southern side of the community, the tornado damaged multiple buildings, removing part of the roof from a house and uprooting a nearby tree. Just to the northeast, the tornado collapsed the walls of a barn, leaving the intact roof lying flat to the ground, before continuing northeastwards away from Progress as it continued to widen. Crossing MS 575, the tornado uprooted multiple trees before moving through Simmonsville, where the outer circulation uprooted trees. The tornado further strengthened to high-end EF2 intensity as it destroyed a manufactured home, stripping it to its frame and damaging multiple others nearby. To the southeast of Dykes Crossing, the tornado removed large sections of roof systems from two manufactured homes, collapsing the exterior walls of another and completely blowing away one with winds up to 130 mph (210 km/h) along Dykes Walthall County Road. Moving northeastwards, the tornado continued to cause widespread tree damage as it entered Walthall County.

=== Walthall County, peak intensity, & track towards Marion County ===
Upon entering Walthall County, the tornado blew down entire swaths of trees, then crossed New River Road. There, the Paradise Ranch RV resort suffered a direct hit from the tornado at mid-range EF2 intensity, destroying 210 campsites and all 27 of its cabins, and downing up to 135 acres of 40-year-old pine trees. Multiple manufactured homes were completely obliterated and blown away, one of which was on elevated pylons. RV trailers from the resort were also destroyed, and one RV camper was thrown nearly 200 yards, left stripped to its frame among a pile of snapped and denuded trees. Continuing towards the northeast, the tornado caused severe tree damage along MS 48, blowing the glass from the windows in one house and removing the entire roof system of another.

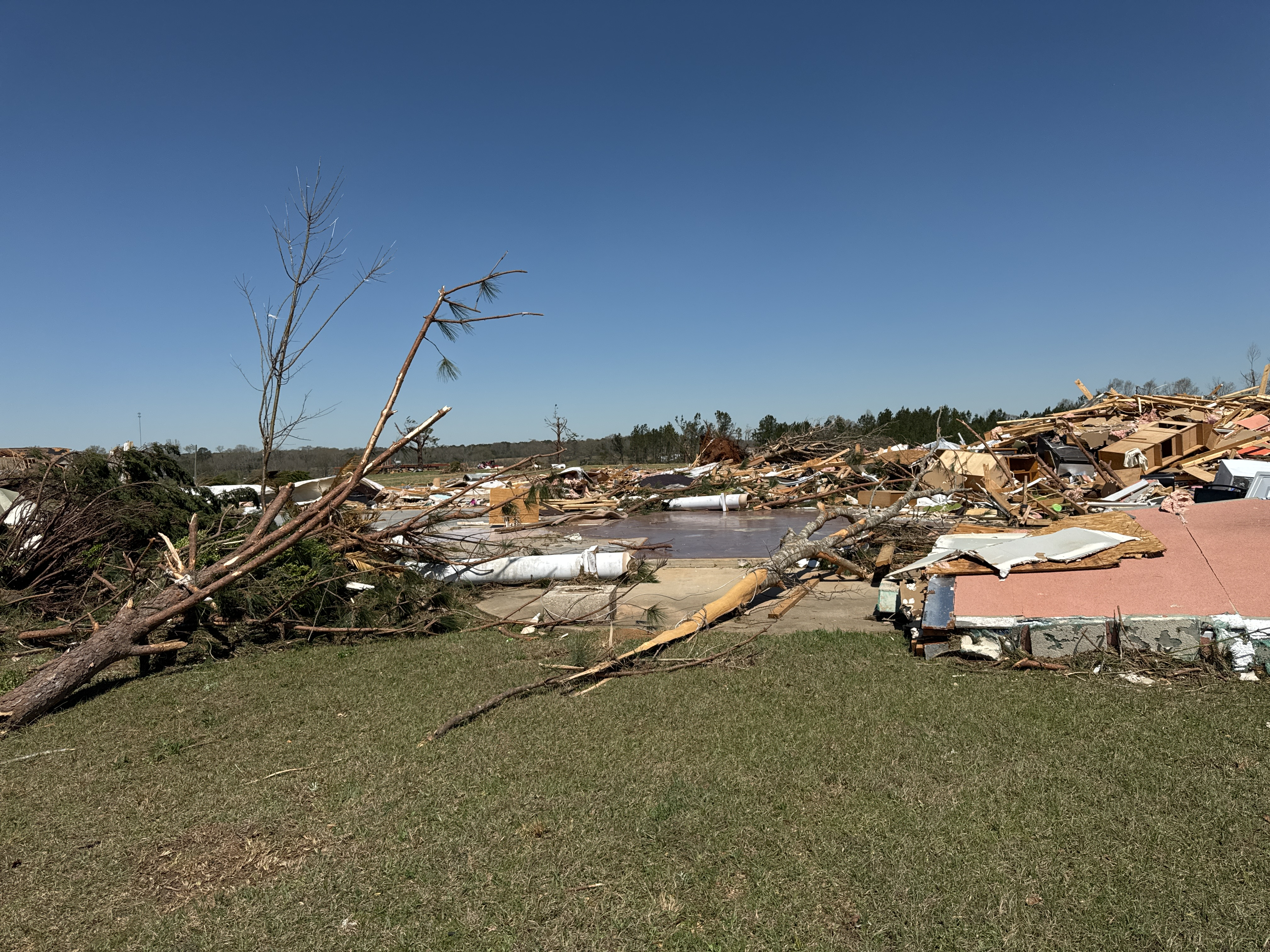
A well-anchored two story home swept away northwest of Tylertown with winds up to 170 mph (270 km/h).

As the tornado passed approximately 9 miles to the northwest of Tylertown and immediately to the northwest of Mesa, it strengthened to EF3 intensity along MS 98, completely blowing away a well-strapped double-wide manufactured home in which two occupants were injured. A metal frame was also found in the area, its origin unknown. On the north side of MS 98, the tornado very briefly strengthened to low-end EF4 intensity, completely destroying a well-built two story home with winds up to 170 mph (270 km/h), injuring another two people. Anchor bolts were pulled from the foundation, of which its wood flooring was bolted onto, and some clips were found, but the majority of the damage was thrown behind the house and inaccessible to National Weather Service surveyors. Nearby, a house sustained severe roof damage, and a car was thrown into a field in the distance. Surveyors noted that this area was one of multiple in Walthall County where the tornado likely attained EF4 intensity, but the most severe damage in rural areas of the county was often dealt to manufactured homes, which can only receive a maximum damage rating of EF3 on the Enhanced Fujita scale. Weakening back to EF2 intensity as it approached MS 583, the tornado slid a manufactured home off of its block piers and completely removed the roof of another house. Along MS 583, multiple houses sustained damage to their roofs, and an outbuilding had its roof & wall panels removed. Moving through mainly rural areas of Walthall County, the tornado maintained EF2 intensity as it snapped and uprooted softwood & hardwood trees alike. Passing over Harveytown Road, the tornado collapsed the walls of an outbuilding and destroyed a chicken coop and a barn. Nearby, a house lost its entire roof system. Along Old Holmesville Road at the Harveytown Road intersection, the tornado strengthened back to low-end EF3 intensity, collapsing the exterior walls of a house. At around the same time, the Storm Prediction Center issued a mesoscale discussion noting that weather radar observations from the WSR-88D system at KDHC in Hammond, Louisiana showed a rapidly intensifying tornadic circulation. Rotation speeds exceeded 60 knots (31 m/s), with brief periods surpassing 90 knots (46 m/s). Additionally, a tornado debris signature indicated that the tornado was lofting debris up to altitudes over 25,000 feet, providing strong evidence of a significant tornado in progress. Based on real-time radar analysis, the SPC classified the tornado as "intense to potentially violent", estimating possible wind speeds exceeding 175 mph (282 km/h). Additionally, the strengthening radar scans prompted a tornado emergency for areas downwind of the tornado in northeastern Walthall County, including Darbun.

Radar loop depicting the tornado as it tracked from Tangipahoa Parish, Louisiana to Covington County, Mississippi

Continuing northeastwards, the tornado destroyed multiple metal building systems, weakening back to EF2 intensity as it approached and struck Salem. There, numerous trees were snapped or uprooted, a church sustained roof damage and had its steeple knocked over, and an outbuilding was flipped onto its roof, left entirely intact along a tree line. Just to the north on East Salem Road, the tornado briefly gained low-end EF3 intensity as it collapsed a metal building system. Two more nearby were destroyed at EF2 intensity, along with metal poles bent to the ground, a damaged outbuilding, and a manufactured home shifted off of its foundation. The tornado began to shrink in size as it approached the Marion County border, regaining EF3 intensity along Summers Magee Road, obliterating a double-wide strapped manufactured home and destroying all sheds or outbuildings in its vicinity with winds up to 150 mph (240 km/h). The tornado subsequently became deadly as it destroyed multiple manufactured homes along Bethlehem Loop Road northwest of Darbun. There, six manufactured homes sustained varying degrees of damage from high-end EF2 to low-end EF3 intensity, along with severe tree damage. Three fatalities occurred in the area, two adults and one child, along with four injuries as per the Damage Assessment Toolkit (DAT). Weakening back to EF2 intensity, the tornado snapped softwood trees before moving into Marion County and the forecast area of the National Weather Service in Jackson, Mississippi.

=== Marion County & Jefferson Davis County ===
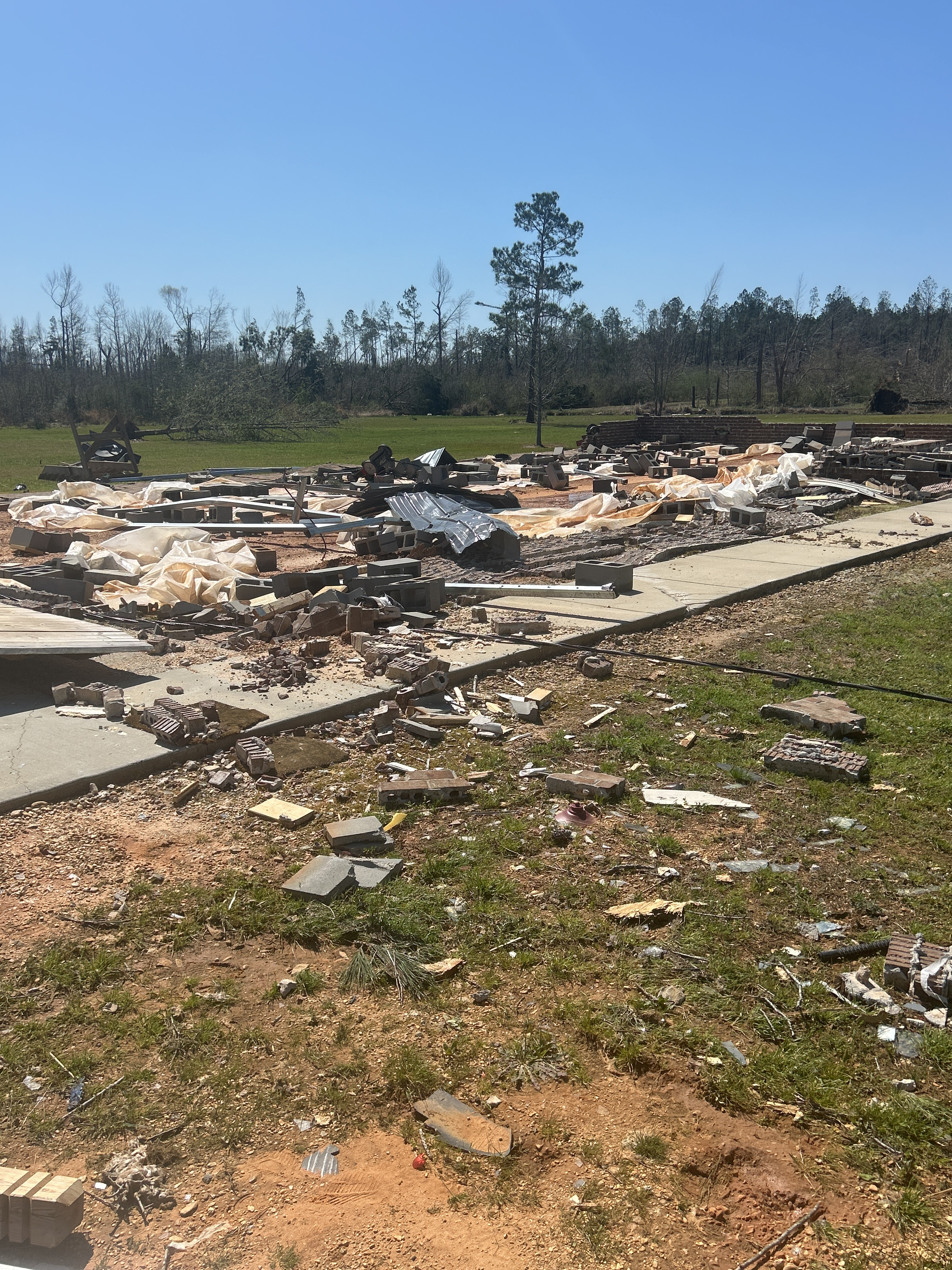
A mobile home obliterated at EF3 intensity two deaths and one injury were recorded here.

Upon entering Marion County, the tornado maintained EF2 intensity as it snapped and uprooted trees, blowing away a manufactured home and causing severe roof damage to a well built home. Crossing Morgantown Road, the tornado continued to cause severe tree damage as it moved northeastwards. The tornado destroyed an outbuilding along Molly Road before briefly fluctuating from high-end EF2 to low-end EF3 intensity, collapsing the exterior walls of a house, removing parts of the roof structure from another, blowing away manufactured homes, and debarking nearby hardwood and softwood trees. Passing through the Whitebluff area to the northeast, the tornado regained low-end EF3 intensity as it snapped, uprooted, and debarked trees along MS 587. Weakening back to EF2 intensity shortly thereafter, it caused additional widespread tree damage as it crossed the Pearl River, then crossed into Jefferson Davis County.

In Jefferson Davis County, the tornado briefly weakened to EF1 intensity as it passed just to the west of Society Hill, uprooting and snapping countless trees. Along Hathorn Road, the tornado damaged three chicken houses, then crossed MS 13, collapsing the walls of a nearby outbuilding. The tornado crossed East Fork Greens Creek, then strengthened to low-end EF3 intensity along Stowey Parkman Road. There, a manufactured home was obliterated, killing two occupants and injuring another. Two other houses nearby had parts of their roof structures removed. Weakening once again as it followed Smith Road, the tornado damaged two metal building systems and multiple homes, removing parts of roof structures and collapsing exterior walls. Free-standing poles in the area collapsed, and numerous trees were snapped or uprooted. As the tornado passed to the southeast of Carson and to the northwest of Bassfield, it caused severe roof damage to a house and uprooted softwood trees along MS 42. Moving over Alex Daley Road, the tornado snapped wood poles before strengthening back to low-end EF3 intensity, collapsing the walls of two houses and blowing away a manufactured home. Just to the northeast at the MS 35 intersection, two more houses had most or all of their exterior walls collapse, with significant tree damage being noted in the vicinity. Another outbuilding was completely destroyed, along with a manufactured home that was separated from its undercarriage. Weakening back to EF2 intensity, the tornado continued to cause widespread tree damage as it underwent structural changes and narrowed substantially in size to 100–150 yards (91–137 m), causing the vortex to spin faster and rapidly strengthen as it crossed Bowie Creek into Covington County.

=== EF4 intensity & dissipation in Covington County ===
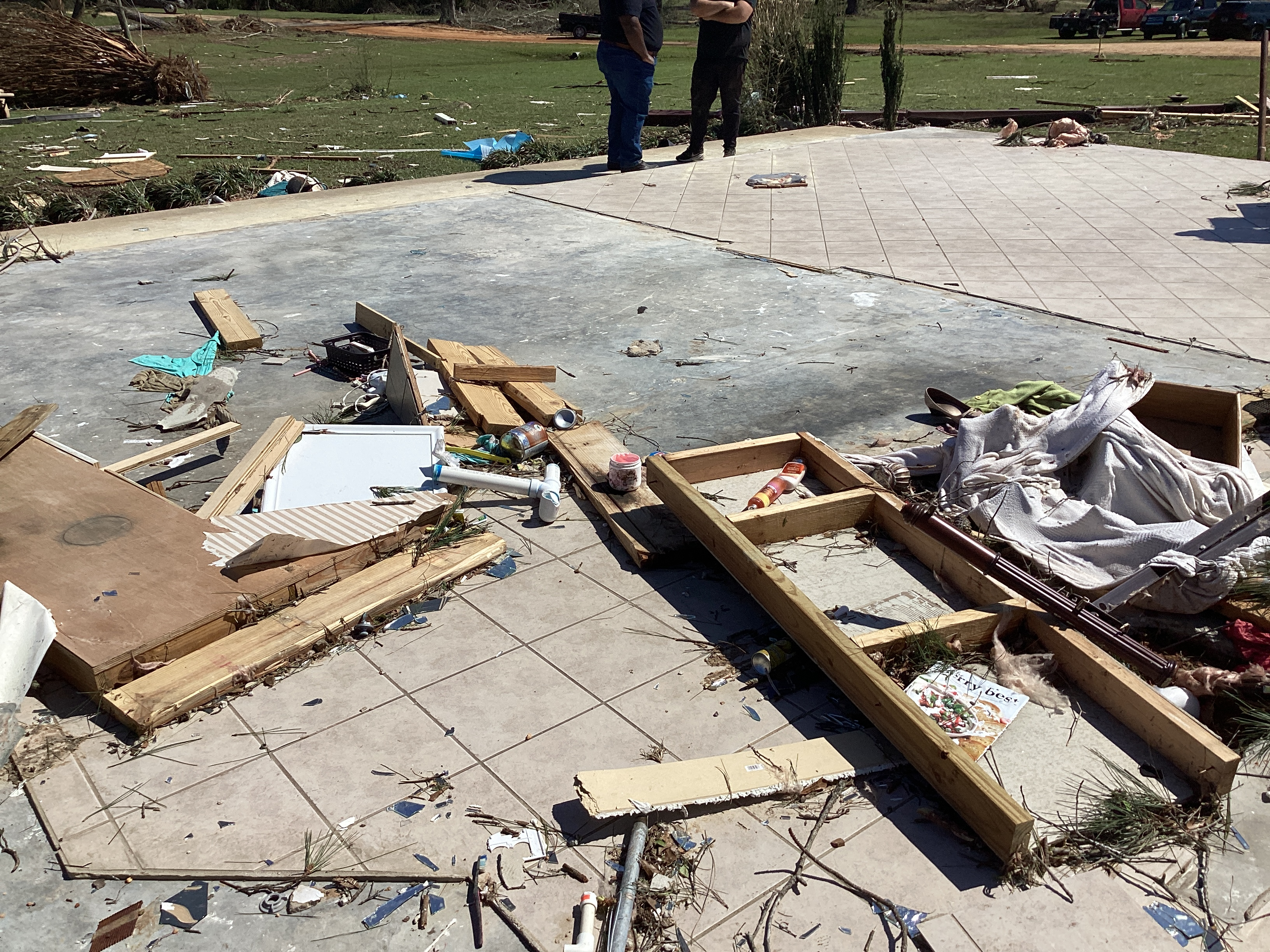
A wood-frame house northeast of Carson swept away with winds up to 166 mph (267 km/h).

Immediately after entering Covington County, the tornado strengthened to EF3 intensity as it crossed Blackjack New Chapel Road, unroofing and knocking down several walls of a brick home, obliterating a mobile home and wrapping its frame around two pine trees, “shattering” debris including a large oak tree, and snapping, uprooting, and partially debarking numerous other trees. Moving over Wilson Road, the tornado destroyed a manufactured home before very briefly reaching low-end EF4 intensity for a second time. A wood-frame house, anchored mostly with straight nails & some anchor bolts was completely destroyed with winds up to 166 mph (267 km/h). The majority of the debris was thrown downstream, including the wood flooring that was scoured from the foundation, and a nearby tractor trailer was overturned and pulled 30-40 yards into the vortex. Additionally, a metal building system workshop that was impacted by the tornado had its frame twisted and portions of iron beams lofted and thrown. Weakening back to EF2 intensity, the tornado removed the majority of the roof structure from a house and snapped numerous hardwood trees nearby. Weakening back to EF1 intensity as it crossed Colbert Branch, the tornado made a brief northwards shift before turning due eastwards as it dissipated off of Spring Hill School Road to the southwest of Collins at 1:39 p.m. CDT (UTC−05:00). The end of the damage path in the forested area was struck again by a separate EF2 tornado 41 minutes later.

This tornado was the deadliest of the entire outbreak, killing six people and injuring at least ten others. It was on the ground for one hour and 22 minutes, with a path length of 67.16 miles (108.87 km), a peak width of approximately 1,400 yards (1,300 m), and maximum winds of 170 mph (270 km/h).

== Aftermath ==
=== Damage & recovery efforts ===
Following the storms, 24 homes were damaged or destroyed in Pike County, 182 homes, 1 business, and six farms were reported as damaged or destroyed in Walthall County, 49 homes, 2 businesses, and 4 farms were damaged or destroyed in Marion County, and in Jefferson Davis County, a further 62 homes and 4 farms were damaged or destroyed. Nearly 9,000 people were left without power in Walthall County alone. Multiple agencies and organizations such as FEMA and the Small Business Administration offered both public and individual aid and federal disaster loans to the affected areas. Numerous disaster recovery centers opened in the wake of the tornado, including locations at McComb, Tylertown, Morgantown, Prentiss, and Collins.

=== Delays in recovery efforts & disaster declaration ===
In the aftermath of the tornado, Walthall County alone sunk over $700,000 (2025 USD) into cleanup efforts, but were forced to halt all operations for upwards of a month as the county could not afford to spend anymore without the assurance that it would receive federal reimbursement under a major disaster declaration. By April 16, the declaration still had not been approved, and at places such as the Paradise Ranch RV resort, debris still littered the ground two months after the tornado in May 2025. On May 21, president Donald Trump issued a federal disaster declaration designating eleven Mississippi counties, including those struck by the tornado, as adversely affected by the storms.

=== Casualties ===
Six people were killed by the tornado, three near Darbun in Walthall County, two near the Oak Vale-Society Hill area in Jefferson Davis County, and one near Carson in Covington County. Around ten other people were injured, although National Weather Service surveyors could not come to an exact injury count as injuries were recorded by county, and because a separate EF3 tornado had also struck Walthall and Marion counties, an exact number could not be determined between the two. Eight of the injured were left in critical condition at the Southwest Mississippi Medical Center in McComb and the University of Mississippi Medical Center in Jackson.

Fatalities known by name
Name	Age	Location of death	State	County	Area	Refs.
Carter Young	7	Mobile home	Mississippi	Walthall	Darbun	
Jeffery Irvin	42	Mobile home	Mississippi	Walthall	Darbun	
Gabrielle Pierre	34	Mobile home	Mississippi	Walthall	Darbun	
Ryan Tolbird	36	Mobile home	Mississippi	Jefferson Davis	Oak Vale-Society Hill	
Mary "Suzette" Tolbird	56	Mobile home	Mississippi	Jefferson Davis	Oak Vale-Society Hill	

== See also ==
- List of F4, EF4, and IF4 tornadoes
  - List of F4, EF4, and IF4 tornadoes (2020-present)
- Tornadoes of 2025
- 2020 Easter tornado outbreak – a tornado outbreak which produced violent tornadoes that struck the same areas
  - 2020 Bassfield–Soso tornado – an extremely large EF4 tornado which struck similar areas just under 5 years earlier and also prompted a mesoscale discussion including the possibility of violent winds
