= Mississippi Highway 27 =

State Highway in Mississippi

Mississippi Highway 27

Route information
- Maintained by MDOT
- Length: 120.9 mi (194.6 km) (119.897 mi excluding concurrencies)
- Existed: 1937–present

Major junctions
- South end: LA 25 at the Louisiana state line near Tylertown
- US 98 in Tylertown; US 84 in Monticello; US 51 in Crystal Springs; I-55 in Crystal Springs
- North end: I-20 / US 61 / US 80 in Vicksburg

Location
- Country: United States
- State: Mississippi
- Counties: Walthall, Lawrence, Copiah, Hinds, Warren

Highway system
- Mississippi State Highway System; Interstate; US; State
| ← MS 26 | → MS 28 |

Mississippi Highway 27 (MS 27) is a state highway in Mississippi. It runs from south to north for 120.9 miles (194.6 km) across the western and south-central parts of the state, serving 5 counties: Walthall, Lawrence, Copiah, Hinds, and Warren. The segment between Vicksburg and Crystal Springs is known vernacularly as the "Utica cutoff" because it facilitates a circumvention of Jackson for I-20 / I-55 traffic flowing between Vicksburg and Hammond.

== Route description ==
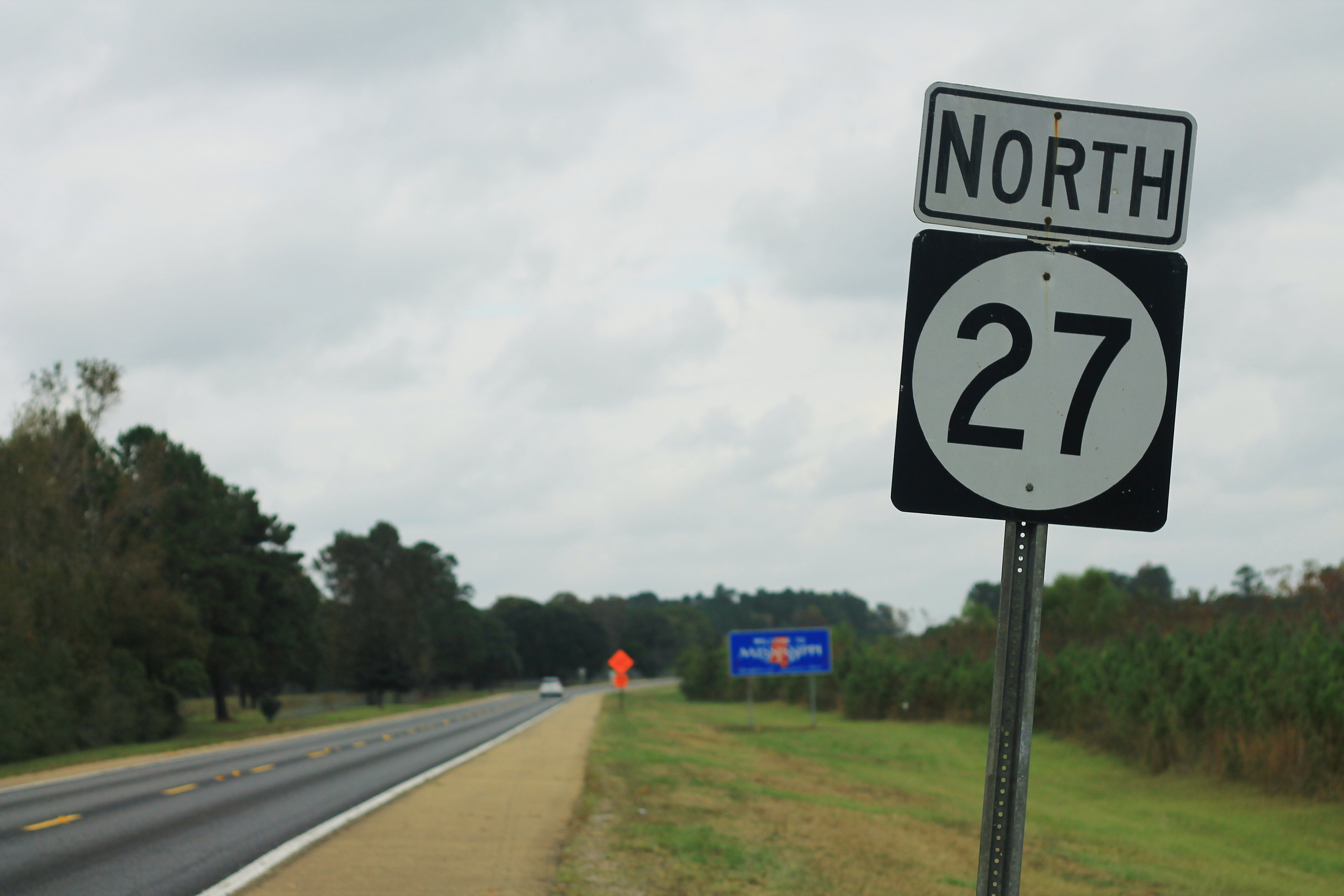
A sign for Mississippi Highway 27, located just north of the Louisiana state line.

MS 27 begins in Walthall County at the Louisiana state line along the banks of the Bogue Chitto River, with the road continuing south toward the town of Franklinton as Louisiana Highway 25 (LA 25). It heads northeast as a two-lane highway to pull away from the Bogue Chitto River as it travels through farmland for several miles, passing through the community of Lexie, before entering the Tylertown city limits. The highway enters town along Franklinton Street, passing by the city cemetery and through neighborhoods before entering downtown, where it has an intersection with MS 48/MS 198 (Beulah Avenue). MS 27 heads north from this intersection as Ball Avenue, which quickly becomes Tyler Avenue as it leaves downtown and re-enters neighborhoods. The highway has an intersection with MS 583 (Tyler Avenue), becoming Union Road before having an intersection with US 98 and leaving Tylertown. MS 27 travels north through mostly wooded areas for the next several miles, passing through the community of Salem before entering Lawrence County.

MS 27 has an intersection with the western section of MS 44 near the community of Topeka before traveling through remote woodlands for several miles to enter the Monticello city limits, with MS 27 completely bypassing the town along its western side, having an intersection with MS 184 (W Broad Street), as well as an interchange with US 84. The highway now leaves Monticello as it heads north through rural farmland and woodlands parallel to the Pearl River for the next several miles, with it traveling through the communities of Rosella (where it has an intersection with N.A. Sandifer Highway and crosses the Fair River), Wanilla (where it has an intersection with unsigned MS 904/Smith Ferry Road), and Oma before entering Copiah County.

MS 27 travels through woodlands as it passes through the communities of Cowanville and Rockport, where it has intersections with both MS 478 and MS 472, before passing through the town of Georgetown, where it has an intersection with MS 28. The highway curves northwest as it passes through the community of Hopewell, where it pulls away from the Pearl River, before traveling along the northern edge of the Crystal Springs city limits, where it temporarily widens to a four-lane divided highway, has an intersection with MS 801 and an extremely short concurrency (overlap) with US 51, as well as an interchange with I-55 (Exit 72). MS 27 narrows back down to two-lanes as it leaves the Crystal Springs area and travels northwest through remote woodlands for several miles to enter Hinds County a few miles south of Dabney Crossroads.

MS 27 travels west through a mix of farmland and wooded areas for several miles to the town of Utica, which it bypasses along its eastern side via a concurrency with MS 18. The highway leaves Utica and travels northwest through mostly wooded terrain for the next several miles to have an interchange with the Natchez Trace Parkway before crossing the Big Black River into Warren County.

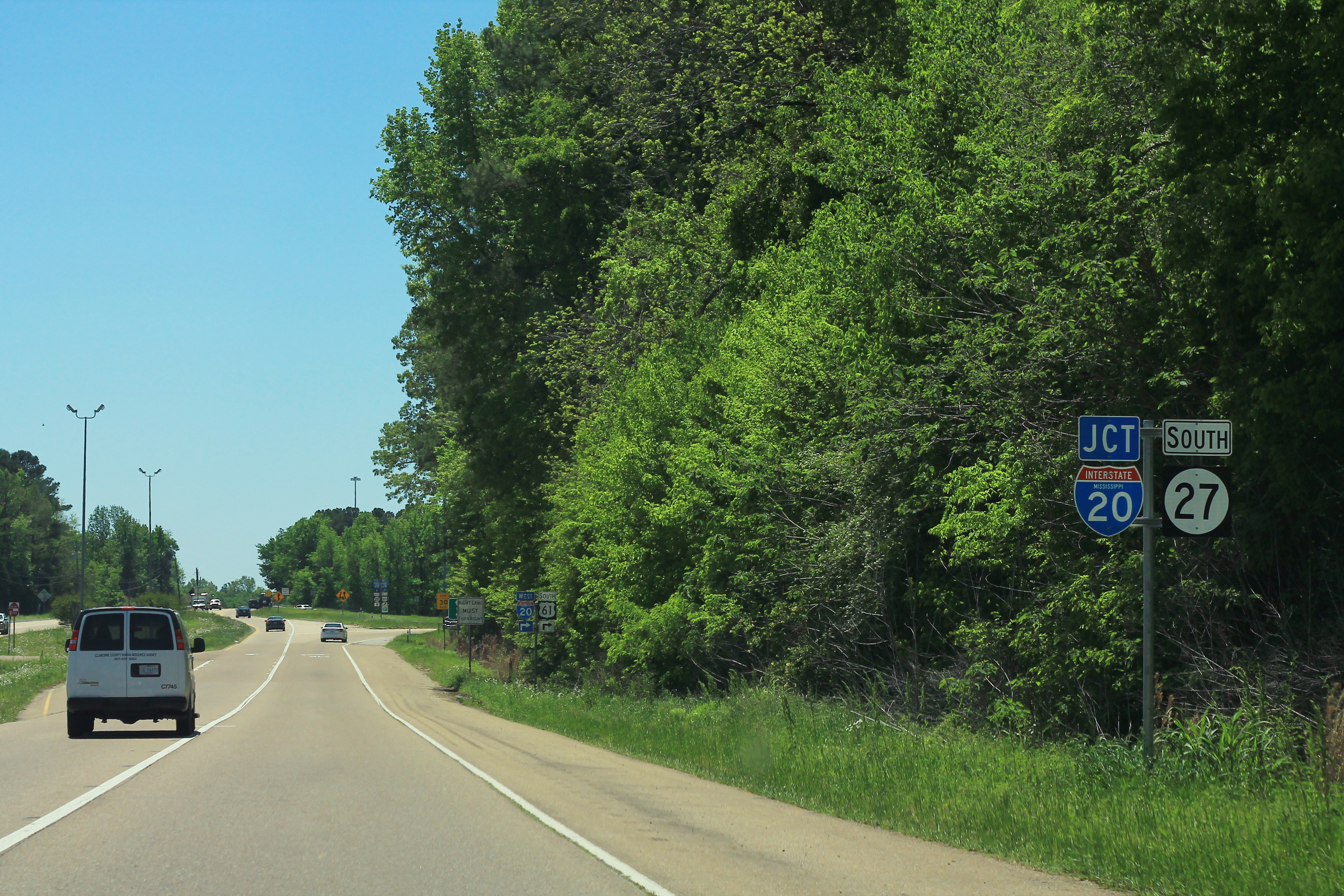
View of the northern terminus of MS 27 from US 61 southbound

MS 27 continues through woodlands to travel through the suburb of Beechwood, where it passes by the Vicksburg campus of Hinds Community College and widens to a four-lane undivided highway, before entering a business district and the Vicksburg city limits at an intersection with MS 822 (Old U.S. 80). MS 27 comes to an end shortly thereafter at a large interchange with I-20/US 80/US 61 (Exit 5 A/B), with the road continuing north as northbound US 61.

== Major intersections ==
| County | Location | mi | km | Destinations | Notes |
|---|---|---|---|---|---|
| Walthall | | 0.0 | 0.0 | LA 25 south – Franklinton | Louisiana state line; southern terminus |
| Walthall | Tylertown | 9.1 | 14.6 | MS 48 / MS 198 – McComb, Magnolia, Sandy Hook, Columbia | |
| Walthall | Tylertown | 9.5 | 15.3 | MS 583 north (Tyler Avenue) | Southern terminus of MS 583 |
| Walthall | Tylertown | 10.1 | 16.3 | US 98 – McComb, Columbia | |
| Walthall | | 22.1 | 35.6 | Darbun Road to MS 586 – Darbun, Foxworth | |
| Lawrence | | 30.8 | 49.6 | MS 44 west – Jayess | Eastern terminus of western segment of MS 44 |
| Lawrence | Monticello | 38.9 | 62.6 | F.E. Sellers Highway - Downtown Monticello | Former MS 27 |
| Lawrence | Monticello | 41.2 | 66.3 | W McPherson Drive - Downtown Monticello | Interchange |
| Lawrence | Monticello | 41.4 | 66.6 | W Thomas E. Jolly Drive - Downtown Monticello | |
| Lawrence | Monticello | 42.4 | 68.2 | MS 184 – Monticello, Brookhaven, Prentiss | |
| Lawrence | Monticello | 42.9– 43.0 | 69.0– 69.2 | US 84 – Brookhaven, Silver Creek, Prentiss | Interchange |
| Lawrence | Rosella | 45.5 | 73.2 | N.A. Sandifer Highway – Ferguson | |
| Lawrence | Wanilla | 47.6 | 76.6 | Smith Ferry Road (MS 904 east) - Wanilla | Western terminus of unsigned MS 904 |
| Copiah | Rockport | 58.2 | 93.7 | MS 478 east | Western terminus of MS 478 |
| Copiah | Rockport | 58.9 | 94.8 | MS 472 west – Hazlehurst | Eastern terminus of MS 472 |
| Copiah | Georgetown | 64.2 | 103.3 | MS 28 – Hazlehurst, Pinola | |
| Copiah | Hopewell | 70.4 | 113.3 | Hopewell Road - Hopewell | |
| Copiah | Crystal Springs | 79.3 | 127.6 | US 51 south / MS 801 north – Crystal Springs, Calling Panther Lake, Lake Chautauqua | South end of US 51 overlap; southern terminus of MS 801 |
| Copiah | Crystal Springs | 79.6– 80.0 | 128.1– 128.7 | I-55 / US 51 north – Brookhaven, Jackson | North end of US 51 overlap; I-55 exit 72 |
| Hinds | Utica | 97.1 | 156.3 | MS 18 west – Port Gibson, Downtown Utica | South end of MS 18 overlap |
| Hinds | | 98.5 | 158.5 | MS 18 east – Jackson | North end of MS 18 overlap |
| Hinds | | 103.9 | 167.2 | Natchez Trace Parkway | Interchange |
| Warren | Vicksburg | 120.8 | 194.4 | MS 822 (Old U.S. 80) to I-20 west / US 61 south / US 80 west – Edwards, Downtown Vicksburg | Former US 80; provides access to I-20 west/US 80 west/US 61 south |
| Warren | Vicksburg | 120.9 | 194.6 | I-20 east / US 80 east – Jackson US 61 north – Rolling Fork | I-20 exit 6; no access to I-20 west/US 80 west/US 61 south; northern terminus |
1.000 mi = 1.609 km; 1.000 km = 0.621 mi: Concurrency terminus; Incomplete access
