= Mississippi Highway 583 =

State highway in Mississippi

Mississippi Highway 583

Route information
- Maintained by MDOT, Lincoln County, and City of Brookhaven
- Length: 39.635 mi (63.786 km)
- Existed: 1956–present

Major junctions
- South end: MS 27 in Tylertown
- US 98 in Tylertown; US 84 near Brookhaven
- North end: MS 184 in Brookhaven

Location
- Country: United States
- State: Mississippi
- Counties: Walthall, Lawrence, Lincoln

Highway system
- Mississippi State Highway System; Interstate; US; State
← MS 575	→ MS 584

Mississippi Highway 583 (MS 583) is a state highway in southern Mississippi that runs just under 40 miles (64 km) in length. The road was designated in 1956 and runs from MS 27 in Tylertown to MS 184 in Brookhaven.

== Route description ==
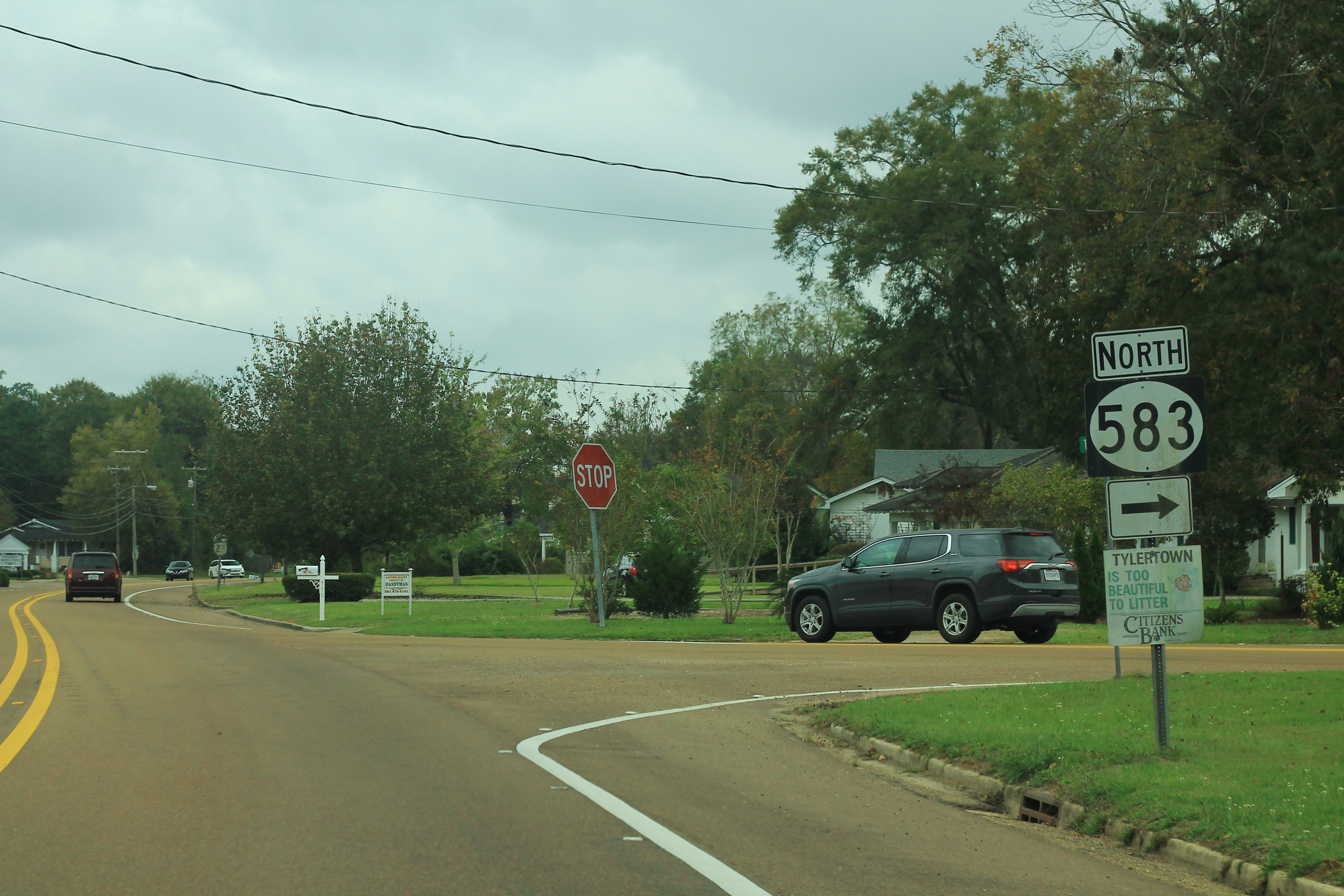
Southern terminus of MS 583 at MS 27 in Tylertown

The highway begins at the intersection of MS 27 (Tyler Avenue to the south, Union Road to the north) and Tyler Avenue north of the central business district of Tylertown, but still within the town limits. MS 583 heads northwest along Tyler Avenue first intersecting U.S. Route 98 (US 98) at a signalized intersection. The two-lane road continues northwest out of town heading through wooded and rural areas of Walthall County. Some farm fields, churches, and a pipeline pump station. At the settlement of Enon, MS 583 meets MS 44 and the two routes form a concurrency heading north for about three miles (4.8 km).

At the Walthall–Lawrence county line, MS 44 breaks off the concurrency leaving MS 583 to head northwest. MS 583 travels through Lawrence County for about one-quarter mile (0.40 km) before entering Lincoln County. At Ruth, the highway meets the former MS 591. The highway makes a more northerly course passing Enterprise High School. MS 583 meets US 84. MS 583 turns to head west along US 84, a four-lane divided highway, for about one mile (1.6 km). After MS 583 breaks off the concurrency, the state highway heads north along South First Street. Just north of its intersection owith Dale Trail NE, state maintenance ends along MS 583. The road is maintained by the county and is surrounded by a large field on its west side and small houses on the east. As it enters the city of Brookhaven, more houses and businesses surround the road. The state highway officially ends at MS 184 (Monticello Street) though at this point, South First Street is only signed as "To MS 583."

== History ==
MS 583 was first designated in 1956 running generally along its current Tylertown–Brookhaven alignment as it does today. A slight change in 1977 occurred when the four-lane US 84 bypass of Brookhaven was completed. MS 583 was moved from the two-lane Greenview Trail to the new four-lane divided bypass.

== Major intersections ==
County	Location	mi	km	Destinations	Notes
Walthall	Tylertown	0.000	0.000	MS 27 (Tyler Avenue / Union Road)	Southern terminus
Walthall	Tylertown	0.715	1.151	US 98 – McComb, Columbia	
Walthall	Enon	15.042	24.208	MS 44 west / Enon Sartinville Road – McComb	Southern end of MS 44 concurrency
Walthall–Lawrence county line		18.019	28.999	MS 44 east – Jayess, Monticello	Northern end of MS 44 concurrency
Lincoln		37.151	59.789	US 84 east / Greenview Trail – Monticello	Southern end of US 84 concurrency
Lincoln		38.286	61.615	US 84 west / Hog Chain Drive SE – Natchez, Moriah	Northern end of US 84 concurrency
Lincoln	Brookhaven	40.770	65.613	MS 184 (Monticello Street) / North First Street	Northern terminus
1.000 mi = 1.609 km; 1.000 km = 0.621 mi: Concurrency terminus
