= Mississippi Highway 587 =

State highway in Mississippi, United States

Mississippi Highway 587

Route information
- Maintained by MDOT
- Length: 29.976 mi (48.242 km)
- Existed: 1956–present

Major junctions
- South end: US 98 in Foxworth
- North end: MS 184 in Monticello

Location
- Country: United States
- State: Mississippi
- Counties: Marion, Lawrence

Highway system
- Mississippi State Highway System; Interstate; US; State
← MS 586	→ MS 588

Mississippi Highway 587 (MS 587) is a state highway in Mississippi. It runs north-south for approximately 30 miles (48 km), beginning at the junction of U.S. Highway 98 (US 98), just past the community of Foxworth and ending in Monticello at US 84. MS 587 serves the counties of Lawrence and Marion.

== History ==
MS 587 first appeared in maps in 1956, from US 98 to US 84. The majority of the section in Marion County was paved in hard surfacing, with the rest in gravel. The route north of Morgantown was removed from the map in 1967, and was added back in 1984, but not state maintained. It became state maintained by 1998. Between 1997 and 2005, the highway was rerouted north of Morgantown to bypass a section adjacent to Red Bluff that had been constructed on weak soil and had gradually eroded due to heavy rains and flooding.

== Major intersections ==
County	Location	mi	km	Destinations	Notes
Marion	Foxworth	0.000	0.000	US 98 / MS 35 – Tylertown, Columbia	Southern terminus
Marion	Foxworth	0.537	0.864	MS 586 west – Darbun	Eastern terminus of MS 586
Marion		12.321	19.829	MS 44 east	Western terminus of Pearl River Bridge segment of MS 44; access via connector road
Lawrence	Monticello	29.976	48.242	MS 184 (East Broad Street) / Washington Street	Northern terminus
1.000 mi = 1.609 km; 1.000 km = 0.621 mi
