= Hezzie Dunaway =

Teacher, schools superintendent and state legislator

Member of the Mississippi House of Representatives
- In office ???–1950

Personal details
- Born: September 8, 1901 Foxworth, Mississippi, U.S.
- Died: December 1, 1950 (aged 49)

Hezzie Ford Dunaway Sr. (September 8, 1901 – December 1, 1950) was a teacher, schools superintendent and state legislator in Marion County, Mississippi. He lived in Columbia, Mississippi. He was memorialized in a join resolution.

He was born in Foxworth. He died while serving his first term in the state house after surgery in New Orleans. He was a Baptist Deacon, a Mason and a Shriner. He had a wife Willie Mae Dunaway and two sons, Hezzie Dunaway Jr. and Harold Evon Dunaway.
