= O.C. McDavid =

American journalist

- Born: May 30, 1911; Ruth, Mississippi, U.S.
- Died: March 12, 1998 (aged 86); Jackson, Mississippi, U.S.
- Resting place: Saint Philips Episcopal Church Columbarium
- Occupations: Newspaper editor, painter, sculptor
- Spouses: Inez Smith (m. 1929; div. 1957) Sarah Ann Samuel (m. 1960)
- Children: 4

O.C. McDavid (May 30, 1911 - March 12, 1998) was an American newspaper editor, painter and sculptor. He was the managing editor of the Jackson Daily News from 1969 to 1977. He is the namesake of the annual O.C. McDavid Journalism Conference of the Mississippi Press Association, and his artwork can be seen on the campuses of Mississippi College and Delta State University.

== Life ==
McDavid was born on May 30, 1911, in Ruth, Mississippi.

McDavid began his career at the McComb Enterprise in McComb. He was the owner of the Perry County Herald in New Augusta in 1934-1935, the manager of the Mississippi Press Association, and the news editor of the Gulf Post Guide in Gulfport in 1936, only to return to the McComb Enterprise as advertising manager. He was the state editor of the Jackson Daily News from 1938 to 1940, when his National Guard unit was mobilized for World War II. He edited the 31st Division's newspaper The Dixie and served as a medical administrator for the division throughout its service in the Southwest Pacific. He returned home in 1945 and became the editor of the Columbian-Progress in Columbia in 1946. He was the owner of the Wilk-Amite Record in Gloster, Mississippi, in 1947-1949, and the Tylertown Times in Tylertown from 1949 to 1953. He was the state editor of the Times-Picayune in New Orleans, Louisiana in 1953, the co-publisher of the Jackson State Times 1954-1956, and the Mississippi editor of The Birmingham News in 1956. He rejoined the Jackson Daily News in 1957, and he was its managing editor from 1969 to 1977. He was also an art columnist, and he retired from journalism in 1981.

McDavid became a painter and a sculptor in the 1980s-1990s. His artwork can be seen on the campus of Mississippi College in Clinton, and at the Delta State University Art Center in Cleveland.

With his first wife Inez, McDavid had four children, including Gene McDavid, who became an executive for the Houston Chronicle. McDavid died of respiratory failure on March 12, 1998, in Jackson, Mississippi, at age 86. The annual O.C. McDavid Journalism Conference of the Mississippi Press Association was named in his memory.
