= Mississippi Highway 556 =

Highway in Mississippi

Mississippi Highway 556
- MS 556 highlighted in pink

Route information
- Maintained by MDOT
- Length: 3.009 mi (4.843 km)
- Existed: c. 1953–present

Major junctions
- West end: MS 184 in Meadville
- East end: US 98 near Bude

Location
- Country: United States
- State: Mississippi
- Counties: Franklin

Highway system
- Mississippi State Highway System; Interstate; US; State
← MS 555	→ MS 558

Mississippi Highway 556 (MS 556) is a state highway in southwestern Mississippi. The route starts at MS 184 in the town of Meadville and travels southeastwards. MS 556 crosses over the concurrency of U.S. Route 84 (US 84) and US 98 inside the Homochitto National Forest, and the route ends at US 98 south of Bude. The route was designated around 1953, after a gravel road from US 84 to US 98, which had existed since 1928, was paved.

== Route description ==
All of MS 556 is located in Franklin County. In 2017, the Mississippi Department of Transportation (MDOT) calculated 330 vehicles traveling on MS 556 southeast of Victor Drive on average each day. The route is legally defined in Mississippi Code § 65-3-3, and it is maintained by MDOT as part of the Mississippi State Highway System.

MS 556 starts at the three-way junction with MS 184 in Meadville, and it begins travelling southeastward. As the route is inside the Homochitto National Forest, it travels through a heavily forested area. The road intersects Fourth Street, which ends at the Franklin County elementary, middle, and high schools. MS 556 leaves the city limits of the town south of a road leading to the Meadville Municipal Park. The route crosses over US 84 without an interchange, and it intersects Mullers Lane south of the overpass. Access to US 84 and US 98 are only available at both termini of the route. The road leaves the national forest and travels southeastwards towards the Homochitto River. MS 556 turns eastward near the river, and it ends at its eastern terminus at US 98 south of Bude. The road continues as River Road Southeast, a road that travels back to MS 184.

== History ==
A gravel road from Meadville to another road south of Bude has existed since 1928. The road at the western terminus was designated as US 84 by 1935, replacing MS 22. The gravel road was paved by 1953, and it was designated as MS 556 around two years later. The road at eastern terminus was also designated as US 98 by 1955, after being renumbered to MS 44 earlier. By 1984, US 84 was rerouted around Meadville, and its old alignment remained in the state highway system as MS 184.

== Major intersections ==
The entire route is in Franklin County.

Location	mi	km	Destinations	Notes
Meadville	0.000	0.000	MS 184 – Roxie, Bude	Western terminus
	3.009	4.843	US 98 – Bude, Summit, McComb	Eastern terminus
1.000 mi = 1.609 km; 1.000 km = 0.621 mi
