= Mississippi Highway 198 =

Highway in Mississippi

Mississippi Highway 198
- Various sections of MS 198 highlighted in red

Route information
- Maintained by MDOT
- Length: 24.937 mi (40.132 km) 6 sections
- Existed: 1993–present

Location
- Country: United States
- State: Mississippi

Highway system
- Mississippi State Highway System; Interstate; US; State
← MS 184	→ I-220

Mississippi Highway 198 (MS 198) is a state highway in the U.S. state of Mississippi. The highway is the designation for six former segments of U.S. Highway 98 (US 98) that have been bypassed by newer alignments. These six segments are located in Tylertown, Columbia, Hattiesburg, Beaumont, McLain, and Lucedale. Five of the six sections of MS 198 are two-lane undivided roads that pass through small towns; the exception is the Hattiesburg section which is a four-lane divided highway running through developed areas of the city. The total length of the six sections of MS 198 is 24.937 miles (40.132 km).

What is now MS 198 originally existed as gravel and earth roads by the 1920s. The portions of the current road became parts of MS 24 and MS 15 in the 1930s and were all paved by the 1940s. US 98 was designated on these segments in 1955. Between the 1970s and 1990s, US 98 was rerouted to bypass Tylertown, Columbia, Hattiesburg, Beaumont, McLain, and Lucedale. By 1998, MS 198 was designated onto the former alignment of US 98 through these communities. The McLain section was truncated from US 98 east of town to MS 57 in 2005.

== Route description ==
MS 198 is legally defined in Mississippi Code § 65-3-3 as the designation for former sections of US 98 that have been relocated by the completion of new alignments.

=== Tylertown ===
Mississippi Highway 198
- Location: Tylertown
- Length: 5.2 mi (8.4 km)

The Tylertown section of MS 198 begins at an intersection with US 98 northwest of Tylertown in Walthall County, heading southeast on two-lane undivided Beluah Avenue. The road passes through wooded areas with some homes and businesses. After passing to the south of Walthall County General Hospital, MS 198 comes to an intersection with MS 48, at which point that highway begins a concurrency with MS 198. The two highways continue southeast into Tylertown, curving east into residential areas. The road heads into the commercial downtown and comes to an intersection with MS 27. The highway passes more businesses before leaving the downtown and heading into wooded areas with some homes. MS 48 splits from MS 198 by heading southeast, with MS 198 continuing east past residences and commercial establishments on Old Highway 98 East. The road leaves Tylertown and heads northeast through wooded areas with some homes. This section of MS 198 ends at another intersection with US 98.

=== Columbia ===
Mississippi Highway 198
- Location: Columbia
- Length: 4.2 mi (6.8 km)

The Columbia section of MS 198 begins at an intersection with US 98 southwest of Columbia in Marion County, heading northeast on two-lane undivided South High School Avenue. The road passes through woodland, curving north into Columbia. Here, the highway heads past several businesses before turning east onto Broad Street. MS 198 heads through residential areas before passing through wooded areas with some homes and businesses as Old Highway 98 East, ending at an intersection with US 98 east of Columbia.

=== Hattiesburg ===
Mississippi Highway 198
- Location: Hattiesburg
- Length: 1.4 mi (2.3 km)

The Hattiesburg section begins at an interchange with Interstate 59 (I-59) and US 98 in Hattiesburg, Lamar County, where the road continues west as part of US 98. From this interchange, MS 198 heads east into Forrest County on Hardy Street, a four-lane divided highway that passes several businesses. The highway passes to the south of the University of Southern Mississippi before ending at an intersection with US 49. Past this intersection, Hardy Street continues east as a four-lane undivided city street.

=== Beaumont ===
Mississippi Highway 198
- Location: Beaumont
- Length: 4.5 mi (7.2 km)

The Beaumont section of MS 198 begins at an intersection with US 98 within the DeSoto National Forest northwest of Beaumont in Perry County, heading east on a two-lane undivided road. The highway heads through dense forests, curving southeast near a few homes as it runs a short distance to the southwest of Canadian National's Beaumont Subdivision railroad line. The road passes through more forests before entering Beaumont, where it heads near a mix of residences and businesses. MS 198 turns northeast to cross the railroad line and come to an intersection with MS 15. At this point, MS 198 turns southeast to form a concurrency with MS 15, leaving Beaumont for dense forests and running to the northeast of the Canadian National line. The road curves south and ends at an interchange with US 98 southeast of Beaumont.

=== McLain ===
Mississippi Highway 198
- Location: McLain
- Length: 1.8 mi (2.9 km)

The McLain section of MS 198 begins at an intersection with US 98 northwest of McLain in Greene County, heading southeast on two-lane undivided West Main Street. The road heads through wooded areas with some homes, entering McLain. The highway passes through residential and commercial areas in the town. MS 198 continues through woodland with some development a short distance to the northeast of Canadian National's Beaumont Subdivision railroad line, ending at an intersection with MS 57.

=== Lucedale ===
Mississippi Highway 198
- Location: Lucedale
- Length: 9.5 mi (15.3 km)

The Lucedale section of MS 198 begins at an intersection with US 98 northwest of Lucedale in George County, heading southeast on two-lane undivided Main Street. The road heads through dense forests with some homes, passing under Canadian National's Beaumont Subdivision railroad line. The highway continues through more rural areas, heading more to the east and passing under MS 63, at which point the railroad tracks run immediately to the north of the road. MS 198 curves southeast away from the tracks into more forests, eventually entering Lucedale. The road heads through wooded areas of homes before turning east and passing through the commercial downtown. In this area, the highway intersects the eastern terminus of MS 26 and the northern terminus of MS 613. The road leaves Lucedale, crossing the Canadian National line and heading into a mix of farmland and woodland with some development. This section of MS 198 ends at another intersection with US 98 east of Lucedale.

== History ==
The current alignments of MS 198 existed by 1928 as unnumbered roads. The sections in Tylertown, Columbia, Hattiesburg, and Beaumont were gravel roads and the sections in McLain and Lucedale were unimproved roads. By 1932, what is now MS 198 in Tylertown, Columbia, Hattiesburg, Beaumont, and McLain became a part of MS 24, which ran east-west across the southern part of the state. The section of road in McLain became a gravel road by 1933. In 1935, the road west of Tylertown became paved. MS 15 was designated onto MS 24 east of Beaumont and in McLain and what is now the Lucedale portion of MS 198 in 1936. A year later, the portion of road east of Lucedale was paved. In 1938, the portion of current MS 198 southwest of Columbia was paved. The road east of Tylertown was paved by 1939. In 1940, a new alignment of MS 24 between McComb and Tylertown was under construction, which included what is now MS 198 northwest of Tylertown. Also by this time, the road between Columbia and MS 44 was paved. In 1941, the portions of road in Hattiesburg, east of Beaumont, in McLain, and northwest of Lucedale were paved. The road west of Beaumont was paved in 1943. The portion of MS 24 between McComb and Tylertown was completed as a paved road in 1944. In 1955, US 98 was extended into Mississippi, replacing the MS 24 and MS 15 designations on what is now MS 198.

By 1973, the road bypassed Columbia. In 1984, US 98 was routed to bypass Hattiesburg on I-59 and a new freeway. A bypass to the north of Tylertown was built for US 98 in 1985. US 98 was moved to a new alignment to bypass Lucedale in 1988. In 1996, US 98 was routed out of Beaumont and McLain as a result of the construction of a new alignment on a divided highway. By 1998, MS 198 was marked on the six former alignments of US 98 in Tylertown, Columbia, Hattiesburg, Beaumont, McLain, and Lucedale. In 2005, the eastern terminus of the McLain section of MS 198 was truncated from US 98 to MS 57 due to the closing, and subsequent demolition, of a bridge across the Leaf River.

== Major intersections ==
=== Tylertown ===
The entire route is in Tylertown, Walthall County.

mi	km	Destinations	Notes
0.0	0.0	US 98	Western terminus
1.5	2.4	MS 48 west	West end of MS 48 overlap
2.3	3.7	MS 27 (Franklinton Street)	
3.1	5.0	MS 48 east	East end of MS 48 overlap
5.2	8.4	US 98	Eastern terminus
1.000 mi = 1.609 km; 1.000 km = 0.621 mi: Concurrency terminus

=== Columbia ===
The entire route is in Columbia, Marion County.

mi	km	Destinations	Notes
0.0	0.0	US 98 – Tylertown, Foxworth, Hattiesburg	Western terminus
4.2	6.8	US 98 – Tylertown, Foxworth, Hattiesburg	Eastern terminus
1.000 mi = 1.609 km; 1.000 km = 0.621 mi

=== Hattiesburg ===
The entire route is in Hattiesburg.

County	mi	km	Destinations	Notes
Lamar	0.0	0.0	I-59 / US 98 (Hardy Street) – Laurel, New Orleans, Mobile, Columbia	I-59 exit 65, western terminus
Forrest	1.4	2.3	US 49	Eastern terminus
1.000 mi = 1.609 km; 1.000 km = 0.621 mi

=== Beaumont ===
The entire route is in Beaumont, Perry County.

mi	km	Destinations	Notes
0.0	0.0	US 98	Western terminus
2.7	4.3	MS 15 north	West end of MS 15 overlap
4.2	6.8	US 98 / MS 15 ends	Interchange; eastern terminus; southern terminus of northern segment of MS 15
1.000 mi = 1.609 km; 1.000 km = 0.621 mi: Concurrency terminus

=== McLain ===
The entire route is in McLain, Greene County.

mi	km	Destinations	Notes
0.0	0.0	US 98	Western terminus
1.8	2.9	MS 57	Eastern terminus
1.000 mi = 1.609 km; 1.000 km = 0.621 mi

=== Lucedale ===
The entire route is in Lucedale, George County.

mi	km	Destinations	Notes
0.0	0.0	US 98	Western terminus
4.8	7.7	MS 26 west (Winter Street)	Eastern terminus of MS 26
5.1	8.2	MS 613 south (Mill Street)	Northern terminus of MS 613
9.5	15.3	US 98	Eastern terminus
1.000 mi = 1.609 km; 1.000 km = 0.621 mi
