= Information & Quality Healthcare =

Not-for-profit corporation

- Formation: 1971
- Legal status: Nonprofit Corporation
- Headquarters: Pearl, Mississippi, U.S.
- Region served: United States
- CFO: Tom Garner
- Main organ: Board of Directors
- Website: www.iqh.org

Founded in 1971 as the Mississippi Foundation For Medical Care (MFMC), the Information & Quality Healthcare (IQH) is an independent, Mississippi, not-for-profit corporation. It was established by the House of Delegates at the 103rd Annual Session of the Mississippi State Medical Association. with an incorporation date of July 6, 1971. A grant from the National Center for Health Services Research and Development in 1971 allowed development of a physician-sponsored system for evaluating the quality of medical care. The primary goal was to improve the quality of medical care in the state and produce long lasting and tangible results. Programs such as the Experimental Medical Care Review Organization (EMCRO) and the Professional Standards Review Organization (PSRO) preceded the Peer Review Organization (PRO) designation which came on July 1, 1984.

In the spring of 1998 the leadership of Mississippi Foundation For Medical Care voted to change the name to Information & Quality Healthcare in order to better meet the challenges of the 21st century.

IQH has worked in quality improvement under contract with Centers for Medicare & Medicaid Services (CMS) for over 40 years and provided tobacco cessation services since 1999. CMS has recently restructured the QIO program to a more regional structure with 14 entities known as Quality Innovation Networks (QIN-QIOs). IQH is a part of the newly formed atom Alliance. The alliance comprises Qsource (Indiana, Kentucky, and Tennessee); Information and Quality Healthcare, Mississippi; and Alabama Quality Assurance Foundation.

== Charter ==
Signatures on the 1971 charter are those of Governor John Bell Williams and Secretary of State Heber Ladner for the state and Dr. J.T. Davis, Sr., M.D. of Corinth, MS, Dr. Everett Crawford of Tylertown, MS and Dr. James O. Gilmore of Oxford, MS as officers of the Mississippi State Medical Association. The charter describes the Foundation as "a nonprofit corporation" and as a "civic improvement corporation", governed by a board of directors, with each member having voting privileges.

== Dr. Arthur A. Derrick Memorial Award recipients ==
The Arthur A. Derrick Award that is presented annually by IQH to recognize a physician’s outstanding efforts to the quality program was created in 1993 in memory of Dr. Derrick. The Durant, Mississippi physician is remembered for his special contributions to medicine in the state and as a long-time supporter of quality improvement and the organization’s work. The award emphasizes the importance of quality improvement.

- 2013: Edward E. Bryant
- 2012: Magdi Wassef
- 2011: William Jackson
- 2010: Rodney Frothingham
- 2009: Samuel Peeples
- 2008: Lee Greer
- 2007: Leonard Brandon
- 2007: Steven Brandon
- 2006: Steve Parvin
- 2005: Stanley Hartness
- 2004: Ken Davis
- 2003: Ralph Dunn
- 2002: Tom Mitchell
- 2001: Alton Cobb
- 2000: Candace Keller
- 1999: David Lee Gordon
- 1998: Jack Evans
- 1997: Glenn Peters
- 1996: George Abraham
- 1995: John Cook
- 1994: Richard Miller
- 1993: Tom Fenter
