= List of state highways in Mississippi (800–899) =

The following is a list of state highways in Mississippi between the numbers 800 and 899.

== MS 822 ==
Mississippi Highway 822
- Old U.S. Route 80
- Length: 6.389 mi (10.282 km)
- Existed: 1998–present

Mississippi Highway 822 (MS 822) is a short highway near Vicksburg, Mississippi. The route starts at a frontage road and travels east along an old alignment of U.S. Route 80 (US 80). MS 822 then ends near Boniva, where state maintenance ends. The highway was designated in 1998, after US 80 was realigned onto Interstate 20 (I-20).

All of the route is located in Warren County. In 2013, Mississippi Department of Transportation (MDOT) calculated as many as 16,000 vehicles traveling west of Maxwell Drive, and as few as 2,700 vehicles traveling west of Amber Leaf Drive. It is not included as a part of the National Highway System. The route is legally defined in Mississippi Code § 65-3-3, and is maintained by the Mississippi Department of Transportation.

MS 822 officially begins at the intersection of Clay Street, Old Highway 27, and the entrance to Vicksburg National Military Park. Continuing east as a divided city-maintained highway, state maintenance begins about 450 feet (140 m) afterwards at an I-20 frontage road. It soon intersects I-20, US 61, and US 80 at an incomplete, modified cloverleaf interchange. The road, still known as Clay Street, travels past a few stores before intersecting MS 27. After that, the road enters through a forest, with small roads and driveways leading to groups of houses. MS 822 then meets Mount Alban Road, a road that crosses over I-20. The route continues to parallel I-20, and gradually closer to a railroad owned by Kansas City Southern Railway. I-20 travels closer toward MS 822 as it heads eastward. The two highways soon travel adjacent to each other. Shortly after I-20 begins to travel northeastward again, MS 822 reaches its eastern terminus at the end of state maintenance. The pavement then changes, and the road continues into Bovina as Old Highway 80.

US 80 has existed since 1928, from Vicksburg and through Meridian. It was paved in numerous sections, including the section in Warren County. That section was straightened out in 1934. By 1960, I-20 was being constructed, and intersected US 80 east of Vicksburg. Four years later, I-20 was extended, connecting to US 80 just west of the Warren–Hinds county line. An interchange was built there by 1967. US 80 realigned south of the interchange, and no longer intersected I-20 near Bovina a few years later. Twenty-four years later, in 1998, US 80 in Warren County was realigned onto I-20, and the alignment between Vicksburg and Bovina became MS 822. No significant changes have been made to the route since.

Junction list

The entire route is in Warren County.

Location	mi	km	Destinations	Notes
Vicksburg	0.000	0.000	Clay Street / Old Highway 27 – Vicksburg National Military Park	Western terminus
Vicksburg	0.090	0.145	Frontage Road	Start state maintenance
Vicksburg	0.235– 0.616	0.378– 0.991	I-20 / US 61 / US 80 – Jackson, Natchez, Monroe	No access from I-20 westbound to MS 822 eastbound & no access to I-20 eastbound from westbound MS 822
	1.279	2.058	MS 27 to I-20 east / US 61 north / US 80 east – Utica, Rolling Fork	
Bovina	6.389	10.282	Old US 80	End state maintenance
1.000 mi = 1.609 km; 1.000 km = 0.621 mi: Incomplete access

== MS 826 ==
Mississippi Highway 826
- Length: 2.316 mi (3.727 km)
- Existed: c. 1957–present

Mississippi Highway 826 (MS 826) is a short state highway in western Mississippi. The route starts at U.S. Route 61 (US 61) south of Rolling Fork. The road then travels northward through farmland, and MS 826 ends at its intersection with MS 14, west of the town. The road was constructed in 1955 to bypass Rolling Fork, and the route was designated around 1957, after a proposal by Sharkey County to transfer the road to state maintenance.

== MS 844 ==
Mississippi Highway 844
- South Pat Harrison Drive
- Length: 0.457 mi (735 m)
- Existed: c. 1967–present

Mississippi Highway 844 (MS 844) is a short highway near Crystal Springs, Mississippi. The route starts at Interstate 55 (I-55), and connects to U.S. Route 51 (US 51) east of the interstate highway. The road that became MS 844 was constructed around 1967, and was hidden in maps by 1974. Instead, a new loop near Crystal Springs was created. The route reappeared by 1998, and the section of MS 844 east of US 51 was transferred to the county by 2005.

MS 844 officially begins just west of the I-55 interchange where the road continues west as Pat Harrison Drive. Heading east from the start of state maintenance, the highway reaches I-55 at a diamond interchange, and travels westward. The route then travels eastward shortly, before ending at US 51. The road, known as South Pat Harrison Drive continues on into Crystal Springs. In 2013, Mississippi Department of Transportation (MDOT) calculated as many as 910 vehicles traveling west of US 51. MS 844 is legally defined in Mississippi Code § 65-3-3, and is maintained by MDOT, as part of the state highway system.

A paved road from I-55 to US 51 has existed since 1967, as sections of I-55 were being constructed. By 1974, it was removed from the state highway map. A new, locally maintained loop around Crystal Springs appeared in the same year. Around 1998, the short route between I-55 and US 51 became part of MS 844. The loop was transferred back to county maintenance in 2005, leaving the short road as part of MS 844.

Junction list

The entire route is in Copiah County.

Location	mi	km	Destinations	Notes
	0.00	0.00	I-55 – McComb, Jackson	Western terminus; diamond interchange; I-55 exit 68
	0.457	0.735	US 51 / South Pat Harrison Drive	Eastern terminus
1.000 mi = 1.609 km; 1.000 km = 0.621 mi

== MS 886 ==
Mississippi Highway 886
- Length: 1.0 mi (1.6 km)

Mississippi Highway 886 (MS 886) is a highway in Central Mississippi. The western terminus is at I-55/Old Agency Road in Ridgeland & the eastern terminus is at US 51 in Ridgeland.
