= Atwood Music Festival =

Music festival in Mississippi, United States

Coordinates: 31.550777°N 90.084318°W

The Atwood Music Festival, the longest running festival of its kind in the state of Mississippi, is an annual festival held near the banks of the Pearl River in Monticello, Mississippi on Memorial Day weekend in May. Originally called the Atwood Bluegrass Music Festival, the event was rebranded to feature a variety of different music styles. The Festival began as a joint effort by the Pearl River Basin Development District and the Lawrence County Chamber of Commerce in 1975 to promote the Atwood Water Park that had recently been completed by the Basin District.

The Festival has featured artists such as Stella Parton (sister of Dolly Parton), The Carter Family, Trace Adkins, John Anderson, Neal McCoy, Jeff Bates, Little Texas, Jamey Johnson, LoCash, Jake Owen, Chris Young, Craig Morgan, Travis Tritt, Emerson Drive, Kieth Anderson, and Charlie Daniels. Following Daniels's headlining performance in 2008, the Festival opted to contract several up-and-coming acts instead of 1 or 2 well-known headliners due to budget concerns.

Due to the COVID-19 pandemic, the 2020 Festival was moved from Memorial Day weekend in May to Labor Day weekend, September 4-5.

== List of main performers ==
- 1975 - Lester Flatt and the Nashville Grass, Doc Watson
- 1976 - Grandpa Jones, Jim & Jesse and the Virginia Boys
- 1977 - Minnie Pearl, Paul Ott
- 1978 - Dave and Sugar, Kurt Kilpatrick
- 1979 - The Hager Twins, Jimmy Martin
- 1980 - Stella Parton, The Carter Family
- 1981 - Dave and Sugar, Rattlesnake Annie McGowan
- 1982 - Helen Cornelius, Razzy Bailey, Paul Ott
- 1983 - David Frizell and Shelly West, Jimmy C. Newman, Elmer Fudpucker
- 1984 - Charly McClain, Vern Gosdin, Lorrie Morgan, Linda Nail, Kent Westberry
- 1985 - Justin Tubb and the Texas Troubadors, Jacky Ward, Helen Cornelius, Kathy Twitty
- 1986 - Dan Seals, Robin Killen
- 1987 - Tom T. Hall, Mark Gray
- 1988 - Jim Ed Brown, Shelley Mangrum
- 1989 - Billy Crash Craddock, Mike Snider, Vicki Bird
- 1990 - Baillie and the Boys, Irlene Mandrell, Jimmy C. Newman and Cajun Country
- 1991 - Connie Smith, Scott McQuaig
- 1992 - Gene Watson
- 1993 - Ronnie McDowell, Mac McAnally
- 1994 - Jimmy C. Newman, John Conlee, Pearl River
- 1995 - Terry McBride and the Ride, James Dixon, Dave and Sugar
- 1996 - Paul Overstreet, Lee Roy Parnell
- 1997 - Ronnie McDowell, Confederate Railroad
- 1998 - Wade Hayes, Doug Supernaw
- 1999 - Suzy Bogguss, Aaron Tippin
- 2000 - Ricky Van Shelton, Cletus T. Judd, Tracy Byrd
- 2001 - Tracy Lawrence, The Bellamy Brothers, The Kinleys
- 2002 - Highway 101, Trace Adkins, John Anderson
- 2003 - Neal McCoy, Doug Stone, Ricochet
- 2004 - Sammy Kershaw, Jeff Bates, Honky Tonk Tailgate Tour, Chad Brock, Rhett Akins, David Kersh, Daryle Singletary
- 2005 - Joe Diffie, Pam Tillis, Andy Griggs
- 2006 - Marty Stuart, Exile, Little Texas, Billy Dean, Kelsey
- 2007 - Emerson Drive, Keith Anderson, Shane Prather
- 2008 - Charlie Daniels
- 2009 - Jamey Johnson, LoCash Cowboys, Honky Tonk Tailgate Tour (Mark Wills, Trent Willmon, Jeff Bates), The Lost Trailers
- 2010 - LoCash Cowboys, Colt Ford, Chris Young, Matt Carr Band
- 2011 - Easton Corbin, Jake Owen
- 2012 - Brett Eldredge, Craig Campbell, Randy Houser
- 2013 - Frank Foster, LoCash Cowboys, Earl Thomas Conley, Chris Cagle
- 2014 - Chris Janson, Craig Morgan
- 2015 - Chase Bryant, Travis Tritt
- 2016 - Jeff Bates, Brothers Osborne, The Bellamy Brothers, LOCASH
- 2017 - William Michael Morgan, Little Texas, Drake White and the Big Fire
