= Red Bluff (Mississippi landmark) =

Natural feature

Coordinates: 31°19′32″N 89°56′45″W

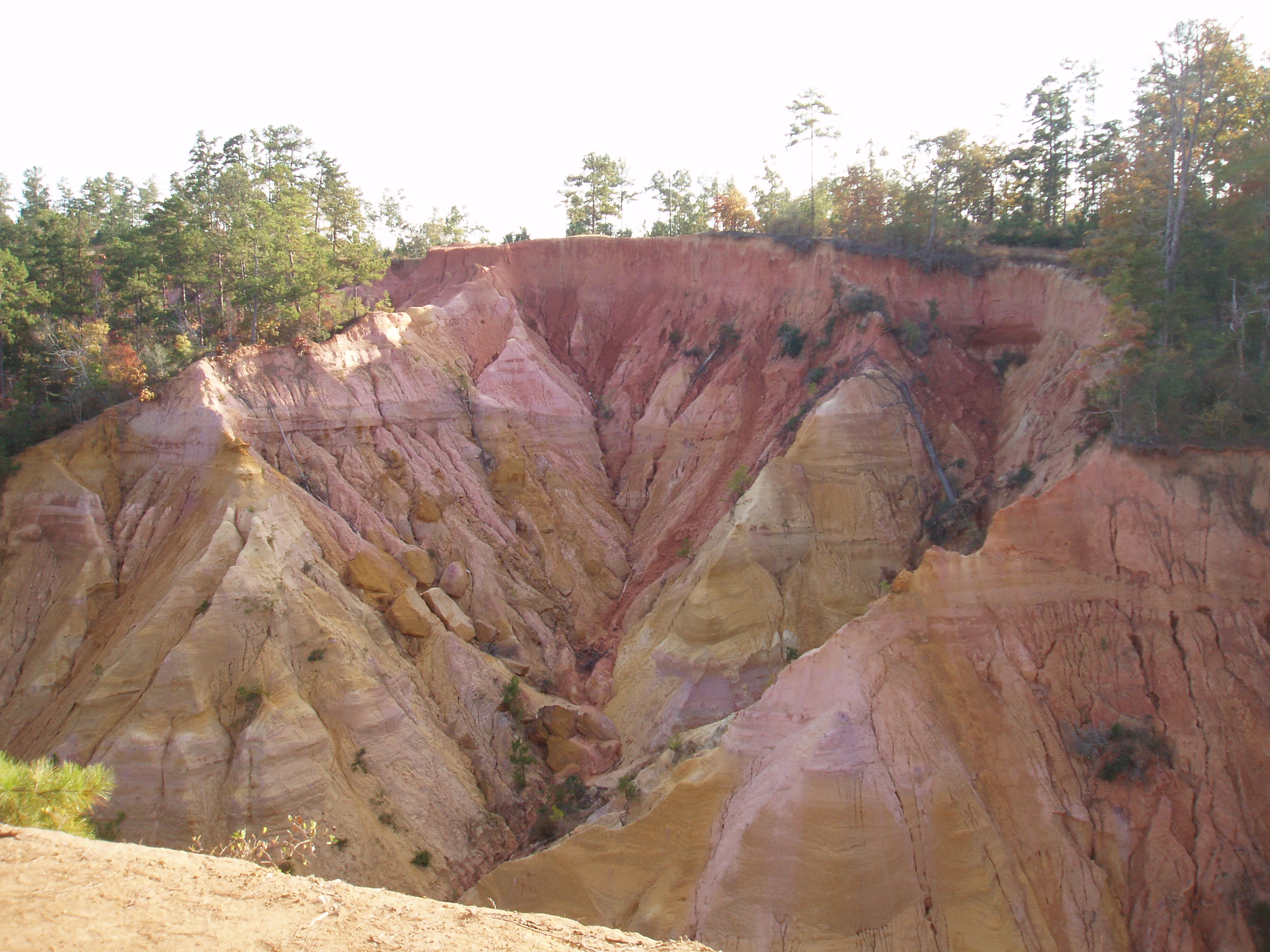
Red Bluff, Mississippi

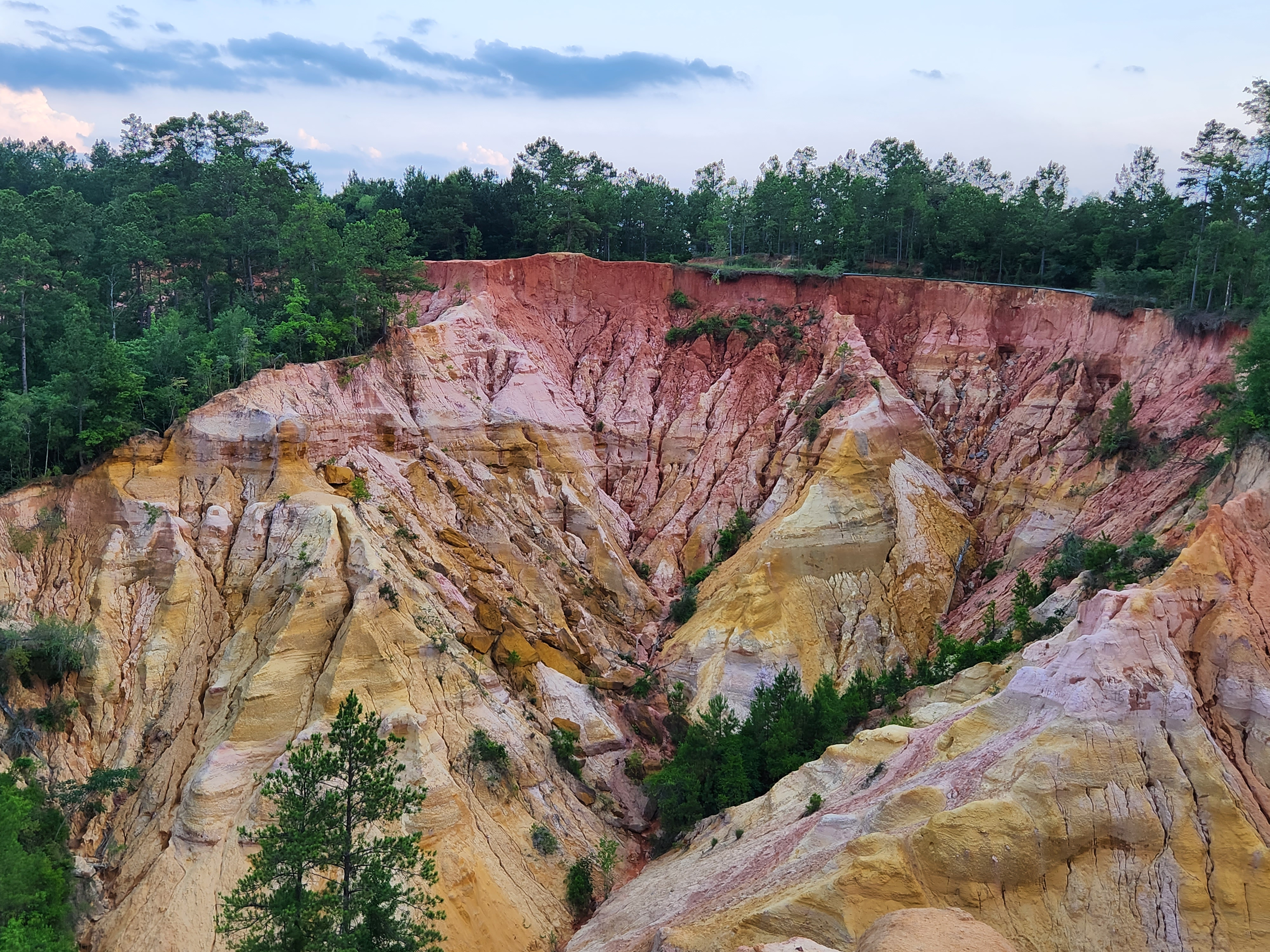
Sharp drop-off with lush trees in Red Bluff, Mississippi

Red Bluff (colloquially known as Mississippi's Little Grand Canyon) is a natural geologic feature, located in Marion County, Mississippi, United States, located about 1.5 miles (2.4 km) northwest of the community of Morgantown.

== Geologic description ==
Red Bluff is a geological formation created by the natural erosion of the west bank of the Pearl River. The bluff is an exposure red clay, soil, sand, and other colorful sediments and rises to an elevation of approximately 371 feet (113 m) above sea level. The bluff slopes sharply by approximately 200 feet (60 m) into the Pearl River floodplain. The natural erosion process continues and has forced the movement of nearby Mississippi Highway 587 at least two times.

== Tourism ==
The view from the bluff encompasses a significant portion of the Pearl River Basin in Marion County, as well as the eastern portion of the nearby city of Columbia, Mississippi.

== See also ==
- Providence Canyon State Park
