= Clem Nettles =

American farmer and politician

Member of the Mississippi House of Representatives from the 97th district
- In office January 1988 – January 2004
- Succeeded by: Sam Mims V

Personal details
- Born: October 10, 1930 Pike County, Mississippi
- Died: January 16, 2018 (aged 87) Jayess, Mississippi
- Party: Democrat

Clem Nettles (October 10, 1930 – January 16, 2018) was an American farmer and politician.

Nettles was born in Pike County, Mississippi and graduated from Carters Creek School. He served in the United States Army during the Korean War. He lived in Jayess, Mississippi with his wife and family and was a dairy farmer. Nettles served on the North Pike School District Board and was the president of the school board. Nettles served in the Mississippi House of Representatives from 1988 to 2004 and was a Democrat. He represented the 97th district. Nettles died at his home in Jayess, Mississippi.
