= Georgetown, Mississippi =

- Town
- Location of Georgetown, Mississippi

- Location in the United States
- Coordinates: 31°52′16″N 90°9′51″W
- Country: United States
- State: Mississippi
- County: Copiah

Area
  - Total: 0.68 sq mi (1.76 km^{2})
  - Land: 0.67 sq mi (1.74 km^{2})
  - Water: 0.0077 sq mi (0.02 km^{2})
- Elevation: 233 ft (71 m)

Population (2020)
  - Total: 252
  - Density: 374.7/sq mi (144.67/km^{2})
- Time zone: UTC-6 (Central (CST))
  - Summer (DST): UTC-5 (CDT)
- ZIP code: 39078
- Area code: 601
- FIPS code: 28-26980
- GNIS feature ID: 0670358

Georgetown is a town in Copiah County, Mississippi, United States. As of the 2020 census, Georgetown had a population of 252. With its eastern border formed by the Pearl River, it is part of the Jackson Metropolitan Statistical Area.

Two sites near Georgetown are listed on the National Register of Historic Places: the Highway 28 bridge over the Pearl River, about a mile east of Georgetown, and the Alford-Little House, off Highway 27 south of town.

== Geography ==
Georgetown is located in eastern Copiah County at 31°52′16″N 90°9′51″W. Mississippi Highway 28 leads west 14 miles (23 km) to Hazlehurst, the county seat, and east 29 miles (47 km) to Magee. Mississippi Highway 27 crosses Highway 28 on the northern edge of town and leads northwest 15 miles (24 km) to Crystal Springs and south 23 miles (37 km) to Monticello.

According to the United States Census Bureau, Georgetown has a total area of 0.69 square miles (1.8 km^{2}), of which 0.008 square miles (0.02 km^{2}), or 1.23%, is water.

== Demographics ==
Historical population
Census	Pop.	Note	%±
1920	317		—
1930	303		−4.4%
1940	415		37.0%
1950	327		−21.2%
1960	285		−12.8%
1970	339		18.9%
1980	343		1.2%
1990	332		−3.2%
2000	344		3.6%
2010	286		−16.9%
2020	252		−11.9%
U.S. Decennial Census

As of the census of 2000, there were 344 people, 135 households, and 88 families residing in the town. The population density was 513.2 inhabitants per square mile (198.1/km^{2}). There were 152 housing units at an average density of 226.8 per square mile (87.6/km^{2}). The racial makeup of the town was 68.02% White, 29.94% African American, 0.87% from other races, and 1.16% from two or more races. Hispanic or Latino of any race were 1.74% of the population.

There were 135 households, out of which 34.1% had children under the age of 18 living with them, 40.7% were married couples living together, 19.3% had a female householder with no husband present, and 34.1% were non-families. 33.3% of all households were made up of individuals, and 10.4% had someone living alone who was 65 years of age or older. The average household size was 2.55 and the average family size was 3.27.

In the town, the population was spread out, with 29.9% under the age of 18, 8.1% from 18 to 24, 29.7% from 25 to 44, 20.9% from 45 to 64, and 11.3% who were 65 years of age or older. The median age was 35 years. For every 100 females, there were 90.1 males. For every 100 females age 18 and over, there were 81.2 males.

The median income for a household in the town was $25,781, and the median income for a family was $31,000. Males had a median income of $28,958 versus $20,313 for females. The per capita income for the town was $17,919. About 19.3% of families and 22.4% of the population were below the poverty line, including 26.0% of those under age 18 and 31.8% of those age 65 or over.

== Education ==
Georgetown is served by the Copiah County School District.

The Copiah-Jefferson Regional Library operates a branch in Georgetown.

== Notable people ==
- Dick Bass, former American football running back who played for the Los Angeles Rams from 1960 to 1969
- David Catchings Dickson, former Speaker of the Texas House of Representatives and fourth Lieutenant Governor of Texas
- Troy H. Middleton, U.S. Army Lieutenant general and former president of Louisiana State University
