= Billy Harvey (politician) =

American politician (1932–2006)

Member of the Mississippi State Senate from the 41st district
- In office January 5, 1988 – March 2, 2006
- Preceded by: Ronnie Shows
- Succeeded by: Joey Fillingane

Personal details
- Born: Billy Vernon Harvey; October 11, 1932 Carson, Mississippi, U.S.
- Died: March 2, 2006 (aged 73) Jackson, Mississippi, U.S.
- Party: Democratic
- Spouse: Patsy Courtney
- Education: Clarke College

Military service
- Allegiance: United States
- Branch/service: United States Army
- Battles/wars: Korean War

Billy Vernon Harvey (October 11, 1932 – March 2, 2006) was an American politician who served in the Mississippi State Senate from 1988 until his death in 2006. At his death, he was chairman of the Senate's Forestry Committee.

Mississippi State Senate
Preceded by Ronnie Shows	Member of the Mississippi State Senate from the 41st district 1988–2006	Succeeded by Joey Fillingane
