= Goss, Mississippi =

Unincorporated community in Mississippi, US

- Unincorporated community
- Location within Mississippi Location within the United States
- Coordinates: 31°21′19″N 89°53′19″W
- Country: United States
- State: Mississippi
- County: Marion
- Elevation: 194 ft (59 m)
- Time zone: UTC-6 (Central (CST))
  - Summer (DST): UTC-5 (CDT)
- GNIS feature ID: 670553

Goss (also known as Prine or Rogers) is an unincorporated community in Marion County located 8 miles northwest of Columbia.

== History ==
Goss was named for its first postmaster, Dr. Zeno Goss, who established a post office in 1891 or 1895. Doctor Goss practiced medicine in the area, and was known for having fought as a Confederate soldier in the Battle of Shiloh. The town is currently situated along the route of a decommissioned Illinois Central rail line, running parallel to Mississippi Highway 13. The rail line was originally established as the Columbia, Lumberton & Gulf Railroad in 1894, and, when the line expanded circa 1900 as the Gulf and Ship Island Railroad, it included service near Goss at milepost 100.32, which spurred the development of lumber and sawmill industries over the years. The W. B. Brown Lumber Company, Newsom Brothers & Buckley Lumber Company, and Bunker Hill Lumber Company operated lumber mills in Goss. In 2011, Georgia Pacific closed their lumberyard in Goss.

In 1900, Goss had a population of 28.

A post office operated under the name Goss from 1891 to 1956.

Goss is served by the Columbia School District.
