= Morgantown, Marion County, Mississippi =

Morgantown, Mississippi
- Unincorporated community
- Location within Mississippi Location within the United States
- Coordinates: 31°18′45″N 89°54′57″W
- Country: United States
- State: Mississippi
- County: Marion
- Elevation: 164 ft (50 m)
- Time zone: UTC-6 (Central (CST))
  - Summer (DST): UTC-5 (CDT)
- ZIP codes: 39484
- GNIS feature ID: 673812

Morgantown is an unincorporated community located on Mississippi Highway 587 in northwest Marion County, Mississippi, United States.

== History ==
Native Americans were the first to inhabit this area. After 1800, other immigrants arrived and settled the area. Among the earliest were Lieutenant Colonel George Henry Nixon, Robert McGowan, Robert Baylor, Francis Barnes Lenoir, and William Thomas Lenoir. Morgantown was an early settlement on the Pearl River, and was originally known as LeNoir's Landing after William Thomas LeNoir.

Robert Baylor, a Revolutionary War veteran and contractor originally from Virginia, was hired by LeNoir to construct a plantation home on the banks of the Pearl River. Baylor traveled to Mississippi with slaves owned by LeNoir. Baylor first lived in a one-room house, now known as the Newsom Home. The LeNoir House was completed in 1818. A family cemetery is located in the heart of what is now Morgantown, and a slave cemetery was located nearby.

Following the Civil War other families moved into the area, including the Beard family. In 1884, local farmer Christopher Nelson Beard Sr. opened Beard’s School in a one-room log cabin on his property. By 1888, the area was known as Beardsville. A Post Office operated briefly, from 1888 to 1889, with Aaron Anderson Beard, a brother to C.N. Beard Sr., serving as Postmaster. In the early 1890s, James Austin "Jim" Morgan and his wife, Samantha (née Dunaway), moved to the local area, becoming the first Morgans to settle in the community. They established the first store in the local community in 1896 and two years later they donated the timber for the construction for a larger school building for the community.

James Austin "Jim" Morgan opened a Post Office in his store in 1904, enlisting the help of William B. Russell, who used his political connections to secure the deal. The Post Office, and subsequently the village, was named Claude after Sallie “Claude” Russell [Cooper], the daughter of Will Russell. Jim Morgan served temporarily as Postmaster and was followed by his son, B. J. Morgan. The Post Office remained in the Morgan family store until it was closed in 1993 and all local residents placed on the rural route. The community is permitted to retain the place name of Morgantown in its official mailing address while sharing the 39483 Zip Code with nearby Foxworth.

The railroad made its way through the community soon after the turn of the 20th century, with a local train depot constructed a few years later in 1912. The depot was located on the western side of the railroad tracks on the New Orleans Great Northern line at milepost 109.61 from New Orleans. Overhearing those working on the railroad discuss the name of the town, Elizabeth “Lizzie” Morgan quickly remarked, “Seems to me it should be called Morgantown with all the Morgans a livin’ here!” By 1908, the name Morgantown was used by the community and the local newspaper. The Post Office officially changed its place name from Claude to Morgantown, on February 27, 1915.

Morgantown has a long connection with Pentecostalism. In 1915, Reverend Warren Evans Sr., along with his wife, Nancy Beard Evans, and children, returned to Morgantown from Florida, where Evans had become a minister with the Church of God (Cleveland, Tennessee) and was the first Pentecostal evangelist in Marion County. In 1917, Evans was beaten by White Caps because of his preaching and left for dead on the main road in Morgantown, but he made a full recovery. Morgantown served as state headquarters for the Church of God in Mississippi from 1918-20, 1923-25, 1928-32, and 1937-39 and hosted many state camp meetings and conventions. In 1933, Reverend R.R. Walker joined the Morgantown Church of God, becoming the denomination’s first minister with a college degree. Morgantown also had the first brick sanctuary for the Church of God in Mississippi, built in 1945 to replace its original building. A new sanctuary was constructed in 2015.

In addition to the Church of God in 1915, Morgantown is where the Oneness Pentecostal movement (now known predominantly for the United Pentecostal Church) was first introduced into Marion County in 1920 and the Church of God of Prophecy in 1958.

The Village of Morgantown was incorporated on January 6, 1922 and remained incorporated until the 1930s. During this time, the village had its own mayor. Among those serving as mayor were B.J. Morgan, Freddie W. Alexander, Albert Boyles, and Kelly J. Hammond.

Morgantown once had a jail. It was a small, open-air structure made of iron bars and located on an area of land near the railroad tracks. It served mostly as a “holding cell” until the county sheriff could arrive from Columbia to collect those arrested.

By 1910, Dr. John G. Prine was the resident physician at Morgantown, soon after receiving his medical degree from the University of Tennessee in 1909. From 1910 to the early 1940s, he rendered medical services for most of the residents. He also served four years in the Mississippi Legislature as a Representative and taught in the public schools of Marion and adjoining counties.

Morgantown Water Association was established in 1963 as the second rural water association in Mississippi through the efforts of local resident, Cleveland Sedgie Morgan, with the initial system including “service to 62 businesses and homes, a 10,000-gallon storage tank and six fire hydrants,” and the first officers were Ben H. Dunaway, president, Philip Sylvest, secretary, and trustees Feldon Morgan, Ancel Morgan, and Mike Pearson.

Morgantown Volunteer Fire Department organized in 1974 with Ken Morgan as its first fire chief. Fire department volunteers built a tanker truck and by 1976 built their first permanent fire station. A 500-gallon per minute pumper was secured in 1978. A new fire house was built in 2001, and also serves as the local voting precinct for Morgantown.

Red Bluff, known as "Mississippi's Little Grand Canyon", is a popular tourist attraction.

Joe Johnson gave tribute to the community in 2018 when releasing the album titled "Morgantown" and featuring his song “Morgantown Creek”.

In 2022, Morgantown received a historical marker from the Mississippi Department of Archives and History. The marker was dedicated on March 12, 2022 and sponsored by Louis F. Morgan in memory of Feldon "Bud" Morgan. It is located at 1449 Highway 587 across from Morgantown Church of God and next to the store once owned by Feldon "Bud" Morgan.

== Notable people ==
- Norman Ivan Boyles, (1936-2012), educator, artist, and sculptor at the Shidoni Foundry.
- James Gordon "Jimmy" Easterling, (1934-2023), musician and songwriter.
- Henry Leo Eddleman, (1911-1995), president of Georgetown College, 1954–59, and of New Orleans Baptist Theological Seminary, 1959-70.
- Kelly James Hammond Sr., (1901-1960), member of Mississippi House of Representatives, 1928–32, and Mississippi State Senate, 1956-60.
- Byron Joseph "Joe" Johnson, (born 1978), musician and songwriter.
- Thomas Blanchard Lenoir, (1829-1874), Mississippi Inspector General of State Troops, 1863–64; Adjutant General (Miss.), 1864-65.
- Ken Morgan, (born 1951), member of Mississippi House of Representatives, 2007–present.
