= Carson, Mississippi =

- Unincorporated community
- Location within Mississippi Location within the United States
- Coordinates: 31°32′17″N 89°47′42″W
- Country: United States
- State: Mississippi
- County: Jefferson Davis
- Elevation: 502 ft (153 m)
- Time zone: UTC-6 (Central (CST))
  - Summer (DST): UTC-5 (CDT)
- ZIP code: 39427
- Area codes: 601 & 769
- GNIS feature ID: 668100

Carson is an unincorporated community in Jefferson Davis County, Mississippi, United States. Carson is located on Mississippi Highway 42, 6 miles (9.7 km) southeast of Prentiss.

== History ==
Carson was located in Covington County prior to the creation of Jefferson Davis County. A post office first opened under the name Carson in 1900.

Carson is located on the former Illinois Central Gulf Railroad, and once featured six general stores, two sawmills, and multiple lumber camps. The Longleaf Trace recreational trail was erected over the abandoned rail line in 2000.

On March 15, A violent EF4 struck the town. Tornado outbreak of March 13–16, 2025#Kentwood, Louisiana/Tylertown–Bassfield, Mississippi

== Notable people ==
- Billy Harvey, member of the Mississippi State Senate from 1988 to 2006
