= Bude, Mississippi =

- Town
- Location of Bude, Mississippi

- Location in the United States
- Coordinates: 31°27′48″N 90°50′48″W
- Country: United States
- State: Mississippi
- County: Franklin

Area
  - Total: 1.43 sq mi (3.70 km^{2})
  - Land: 1.42 sq mi (3.69 km^{2})
  - Water: 0.0039 sq mi (0.01 km^{2})
- Elevation: 240 ft (73 m)

Population (2020)
  - Total: 780
  - Density: 547.3/sq mi (211.33/km^{2})
- Time zone: UTC-6 (Central (CST))
  - Summer (DST): UTC-5 (CDT)
- ZIP code: 39630
- Area code: 601
- FIPS code: 28-09460
- GNIS feature ID: 0692752

Bude is a town in Franklin County, Mississippi, United States. As of the 2020 census, Bude had a population of 780. Bude is located on the north bank of the Homochitto River, which bisects the county on a diagonal running from northeast to southwest, where it flows on its way to the Mississippi River. U.S. Routes 98 and 84 run by Bude.

American Industrial Transport (AITX) operates a large maintenance shop in Bude.

Bude appeared in a March 2017 segment of 60 Minutes because its chess team won the state championship.

== History ==
Bude was founded by European Americans in 1912 and named for the former home in England of Mrs. F.L. Peck, whose husband was one of the town's founders.

== Geography ==
Bude is located in central Franklin County. It is 3 miles (5 km) east of Meadville, the county seat. US 84 leads east 28 miles (45 km) to Brookhaven, and US 98 leads southeast 35 miles (56 km) to McComb. The two highways together lead west 36 miles (58 km) to Natchez.

According to the United States Census Bureau, the town of Bude has a total area of 1.4 square miles (3.7 km^{2}), of which 0.004 square miles (0.01 km^{2}), or 0.33%, is water.

As the town is in the center of southwest Mississippi, there is a Mississippi Public Broadcasting radio and TV antenna located in the town.

== Demographics ==
Historical population
| Census | Pop. | Note | %± |
|---|---|---|---|
| 1920 | 1,121 | | — |
| 1930 | 1,378 | | 22.9% |
| 1940 | 1,207 | | −12.4% |
| 1950 | 1,195 | | −1.0% |
| 1960 | 1,185 | | −0.8% |
| 1970 | 1,146 | | −3.3% |
| 1980 | 1,092 | | −4.7% |
| 1990 | 969 | | −11.3% |
| 2000 | 1,037 | | 7.0% |
| 2010 | 1,063 | | 2.5% |
| 2020 | 780 | | −26.6% |
U.S. Decennial Census

=== Racial and ethnic composition ===
Bude town, Mississippi – Racial and ethnic composition Note: the US Census treats Hispanic/Latino as an ethnic category. This table excludes Latinos from the racial categories and assigns them to a separate category. Hispanics/Latinos may be of any race.
| Race / Ethnicity (NH = Non-Hispanic) | Pop 2000 | Pop 2010 | Pop 2020 | % 2000 | % 2010 | % 2020 |
|---|---|---|---|---|---|---|
| White alone (NH) | 456 | 473 | 344 | 43.97% | 44.50% | 44.10% |
| Black or African American alone (NH) | 568 | 558 | 406 | 54.77% | 52.49% | 52.05% |
| Native American or Alaska Native alone (NH) | 5 | 2 | 0 | 0.48% | 0.19% | 0.00% |
| Asian alone (NH) | 0 | 0 | 0 | 0.00% | 0.00% | 0.00% |
| Native Hawaiian or Pacific Islander alone (NH) | 0 | 0 | 0 | 0.00% | 0.00% | 0.00% |
| Other race alone (NH) | 0 | 0 | 2 | 0.00% | 0.00% | 0.26% |
| Mixed race or Multiracial (NH) | 3 | 14 | 16 | 0.29% | 1.32% | 2.05% |
| Hispanic or Latino (any race) | 5 | 16 | 12 | 0.48% | 1.51% | 1.54% |
| Total | 1,037 | 1,063 | 780 | 100.00% | 100.00% | 100.00% |

=== 2020 census ===
As of the 2020 United States census, there were 780 people, 359 households, and 175 families residing in the town.

== Education ==
Bude is served by the Franklin County School District.

== In popular culture ==
Bude is mentioned in John Grisham's novel The Chamber:

The white male selected a phone number. His conversation went something like this: "Hello, this is Lester Crosby, from Bude, Mississippi. I'm calling about the execution of Sam Cayhall. Yes ma'am. My number? It's 555-9084. Yes, that's right, Bude, Mississippi, down here in Franklin County."

== Notable people ==
- Regina B. Schofield, former U.S. Assistant Attorney General for the Office of Justice Programs. At Schofield's confirmation hearing in 2005, Trent Lott, born in Grenada, said:
  I am very proud of her background, being from Bude, Mississippi. It is a long way from Bude, Mississippi, to Washington, D.C., and the Justice Department. In fact, if I gave you a map, you probably couldn't find it, but you have got some areas in Kansas pretty far out at the end of the road, too. It is a lot of beautiful people, and I know that community is very proud of Regina and her achievements.
