= Topeka, Mississippi =

- Unincorporated community
- Location within Mississippi Location within the United States
- Coordinates: 31°24′55″N 90°11′18″W
- Country: United States
- State: Mississippi
- County: Lawrence
- Elevation: 472 ft (144 m)
- Time zone: UTC-6 (Central (CST))
  - Summer (DST): UTC-5 (CDT)
- ZIP code: 39665
- Area codes: 601 & 769
- GNIS feature ID: 678823

Topeka is an unincorporated community in Lawrence County, in the U.S. state of Mississippi.

== History ==
The community's name is a transfer from Topeka, Kansas. A post office called Topeka was established in 1903, and remained in operation until 1914.

The Natchez, Columbia and Mobile Railroad operated a rail line through Topeka until 1932.
