= Ruth, Mississippi =

- Unincorporated community
- Location within Mississippi Location within the United States
- Coordinates: 31°22′54″N 90°18′59″W
- Country: United States
- State: Mississippi
- County: Lincoln
- Elevation: 463 ft (141 m)
- Time zone: UTC-6 (Central (CST))
  - Summer (DST): UTC-5 (CDT)
- ZIP code: 39662
- Area codes: 601 & 769
- GNIS feature ID: 676974

Ruth is an unincorporated community in Lincoln County, Mississippi, United States. Its ZIP code is 39662.

== History ==
Ruth is located on the former Natchez, Columbia & Mobile Railroad and was first settled in the 1880s. The community is named for the daughter of Smith Felder, who opened its first post office in 1891.

In 1900, Ruth had a population of 20.

The Ruth School was founded in 1924 with funding from the Smith-Hughes Act. In 1941, the Works Progress Administration remodeled the school building. The school closed in 1961.

== Notable person ==
- O.C. McDavid, managing editor of the Jackson Daily News from 1969 to 1977, painter, and sculptor
