= Jayess, Mississippi =

- Unincorporated community
- Location within Mississippi Location within the United States
- Coordinates: 31°21′54″N 90°12′21″W
- Country: United States
- State: Mississippi
- County: Lawrence
- Elevation: 446 ft (136 m)
- Time zone: UTC-6 (Central (CST))
  - Summer (DST): UTC-5 (CDT)
- ZIP code: 39641
- Area codes: 601 & 769
- GNIS feature ID: 671818

Jayess is an unincorporated community in Lawrence County, Mississippi, United States.

== History ==
Jayess was named for J.S. Butterfield, owner of the Butterfield Lumber Company. The Butterfield Company laid down a railroad through Jayess in 1912 to transport timber being harvested in the area to the company's sawmill in Norfield, approximately 15 mi (24 km) west of Jayess. J.S. Butterfield's initials were used until the Postal Department changed it in when opened in 1912, to create the name "Jayess.". A post office is still located at the settlement.

Both a sawmill and a cotton gin were located in Jayess.

A klavern of the Ku Klux Klan was located in Jayess during the early 1960s.

The Jayess Baptist Church is located at the settlement. Located west of Jayess is the Boyd-Cothern House, constructed in 1837, and listed on the National Register of Historic Places in 1980.

== Notable people ==
- Jimmy Boyd, singer, musician, and actor best known for 1950s holiday hit "I Saw Mommy Kissing Santa Claus."
- Clem Nettles, member of the Mississippi House of Representatives.
- Ineva May-Pittman, civil rights activist; recipient of Jackson, Mississippi City Council's 2015 "Woman of the Year" award.
