= Monticello, Mississippi =

- Town
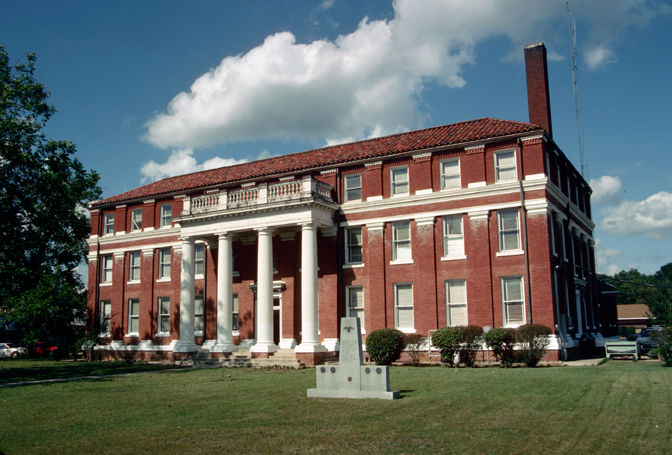
- Lawrence County Courthouse in Monticello

- Flag Logo
- Motto: "A river of possibilities"
- Location of Monticello, Mississippi

- Location in the United States
- Coordinates: 31°33′15″N 90°6′36″W
- Country: United States
- State: Mississippi
- County: Lawrence

Area
  - Total: 4.26 sq mi (11.04 km^{2})
  - Land: 4.17 sq mi (10.80 km^{2})
  - Water: 0.093 sq mi (0.24 km^{2})
- Elevation: 194 ft (59 m)

Population (2020)
  - Total: 1,441
  - Density: 345.5/sq mi (133.39/km^{2})
- Time zone: UTC-6 (Central (CST))
  - Summer (DST): UTC-5 (CDT)
- ZIP code: 39654
- Area code: 601
- FIPS code: 28-48560
- GNIS feature ID: 0673748
- Website: www.monticello.ms.gov

Monticello is a town in and the county seat of Lawrence County, Mississippi, United States. As of the 2020 census, Monticello had a population of 1,441.

== Geography ==
Monticello is in central Lawrence County, on the west side of the Pearl River. U.S. Route 84 runs through the north side of the town on a four-lane bypass. US 84 leads east 15 miles (24 km) to Prentiss and west 22 miles (35 km) to Interstate 55 in Brookhaven. Mississippi Highway 27 passes through the west side of Monticello, leading north 37 miles (60 km) to Crystal Springs and south 33 miles (53 km) to Tylertown.

According to the United States Census Bureau, the town of Monticello has a total area of 4.2 square miles (11.0 km^{2}), of which 4.2 square miles (10.8 km^{2}) are land and 0.1 square miles (0.2 km^{2}), or 2.17%, are water.

=== Climate ===
Climate data for Monticello, Mississippi (1991–2020)
Month	Jan	Feb	Mar	Apr	May	Jun	Jul	Aug	Sep	Oct	Nov	Dec	Year
Mean daily maximum °F (°C)	61.7 (16.5)	66.7 (19.3)	73.8 (23.2)	80.9 (27.2)	87.8 (31.0)	93.5 (34.2)	95.8 (35.4)	95.8 (35.4)	91.0 (32.8)	81.9 (27.7)	71.5 (21.9)	64.2 (17.9)	80.4 (26.9)
Daily mean °F (°C)	48.9 (9.4)	53.2 (11.8)	60.1 (15.6)	66.9 (19.4)	74.5 (23.6)	81.0 (27.2)	83.5 (28.6)	83.3 (28.5)	78.5 (25.8)	67.7 (19.8)	57.5 (14.2)	51.3 (10.7)	67.2 (19.6)
Mean daily minimum °F (°C)	36.0 (2.2)	39.7 (4.3)	46.4 (8.0)	52.9 (11.6)	61.2 (16.2)	68.5 (20.3)	71.3 (21.8)	70.7 (21.5)	66.1 (18.9)	53.5 (11.9)	43.6 (6.4)	38.5 (3.6)	54.0 (12.2)
Average precipitation inches (mm)	5.97 (152)	5.95 (151)	5.70 (145)	5.76 (146)	4.49 (114)	4.71 (120)	5.88 (149)	4.22 (107)	3.56 (90)	4.24 (108)	4.67 (119)	5.20 (132)	60.35 (1,533)
Average snowfall inches (cm)	0.1 (0.25)	0.0 (0.0)	0.0 (0.0)	0.0 (0.0)	0.0 (0.0)	0.0 (0.0)	0.0 (0.0)	0.0 (0.0)	0.0 (0.0)	0.0 (0.0)	0.0 (0.0)	0.1 (0.25)	0.2 (0.5)
Source: NOAA

== Demographics ==
Historical population
Census	Pop.	Note	%±
1860	221		—
1870	200		−9.5%
1910	450		—
1920	464		3.1%
1930	606		30.6%
1940	802		32.3%
1950	1,382		72.3%
1960	1,432		3.6%
1970	1,790		25.0%
1980	1,834		2.5%
1990	1,755		−4.3%
2000	1,726		−1.7%
2010	1,571		−9.0%
2020	1,441		−8.3%
U.S. Decennial Census

=== Racial and ethnic composition ===
Monticello town, Mississippi – Racial and ethnic composition Note: the US Census treats Hispanic/Latino as an ethnic category. This table excludes Latinos from the racial categories and assigns them to a separate category. Hispanics/Latinos may be of any race.
Race / Ethnicity (NH = Non-Hispanic)	Pop 2000	Pop 2010	Pop 2020	% 2000	% 2010	% 2020
White alone (NH)	1,108	907	894	64.19%	57.73%	62.04%
Black or African American alone (NH)	589	501	468	34.13%	31.89%	32.48%
Native American or Alaska Native alone (NH)	0	0	0	0.00%	0.00%	0.00%
Asian alone (NH)	17	11	10	0.98%	0.70%	0.69%
Native Hawaiian or Pacific Islander alone (NH)	0	0	1	0.00%	0.00%	0.07%
Other race alone (NH)	0	2	4	0.00%	0.13%	0.28%
Mixed race or Multiracial (NH)	11	8	34	0.64%	0.51%	2.36%
Hispanic or Latino (any race)	1	142	30	0.06%	9.04%	2.08%
Total	1,726	1,571	1,441	100.00%	100.00%	100.00%

=== 2020 census ===
As of the 2020 United States census, there were 1,441 people, 640 households, and 350 families residing in the town.

== Education ==
The town of Monticello is served by the Lawrence County School District. The district is under the supervision of Superintendent Tammy Fairburn, who took office in 2012.

== Notable people ==
- Richard Olney Arrington, justice of the Supreme Court of Mississippi from 1950-1963
- Erick Dampier, NBA center
- Katherine Ettl, sculptor
- Major Everett, former NFL running back
- Cindy Hyde-Smith, United States Senator
- Al Jefferson, forward/center for the NBA Indiana Pacers
- Kendra King, Miss Mississippi USA 2006
- J. B. Lenoir, blues singer
- Charles Lynch, 8th and 11th Governor of Mississippi
- Henry Mayson, former member of the Mississippi House of Representatives and attended the 1868 Mississippi Constitutional Convention
- Harvey McGehee, former member of the Mississippi State Senate and justice of the Supreme Court of Mississippi from 1937 to 1964
- Jim Pace, professional racing driver
- Rod Paige, former U.S. Secretary of Education
- Neville Patterson, justice of the Supreme Court of Mississippi from 1962 to 1986
- Rosalind Peychaud, former member of the Louisiana House of Representatives
- Hiram Runnels, 9th Governor of Mississippi
- George Washington Russell, member of the Mississippi House of Representatives 1916 to 1924
- Francis M. Sheppard, former member of the Mississippi State Senate and Mississippi House of Representatives
- Byther Smith, blues singer
- T. B. Stamps, former member of the Louisiana House of Representatives and the Louisiana State Senate
- William Sutton Sr., former President of Mississippi Valley State University
- Matthew Wells, American football linebacker

== See also ==
- Atwood Music Festival
