= Foxworth, Mississippi =

- Census-designated place
- Location within Mississippi Location within the United States
- Coordinates: 31°14′18″N 89°52′07″W
- Country: United States
- State: Mississippi
- County: Marion

Area
  - Total: 2.76 sq mi (7.1 km^{2})
  - Land: 2.76 sq mi (7.1 km^{2})
  - Water: 0.0 sq mi (0 km^{2})
- Elevation: 154 ft (47 m)

Population (2020)
  - Total: 523
  - Density: 189.5/sq mi (73.2/km^{2})
- Time zone: UTC-6 (Central (CST))
  - Summer (DST): UTC-5 (CDT)
- ZIP code: 39483
- Area code: 601
- FIPS code: 28-25740
- GNIS feature ID: 670151

Foxworth (also known as Nearest or West Columbia) is an unincorporated community and census-designated place (CDP) in Marion County, Mississippi, United States. As of the 2020 census, it had a population of 523.

== History ==
The community is named after Frank W. Foxworth, who settled the community after moving from the east side of the Pearl River. His father had moved from Marion County, South Carolina, and settled near Columbia, 2 miles (3 km) northeast of Foxworth. The community of Foxworth operated a grist mill, sawmill, and gin.

Foxworth is located on the former Illinois Central Gulf Railroad. The community once had a spur line that connected the Hamilton-Uhl Lumber Company with the New Orleans Great Northern Railroad.

In 1992, the Foxworth Bank merged with Trustmark Bank.

== Geography ==
Foxworth is in central Marion County, on the west side of the valley of the Pearl River, which separates it from Columbia, the county seat 3 miles (5 km) away. U.S. Route 98 runs along the southern edge of Foxworth, leading east through Columbia 36 miles (58 km) to Hattiesburg and west 40 miles (64 km) to McComb. Mississippi Highway 35 joins US 98 as it passes Foxworth, but leads north 21 miles (34 km) to Bassfield and south 32 miles (51 km) to Bogalusa, Louisiana.

According to the U.S. Census Bureau, the Foxworth CDP has an area of 2.76 square miles (7.15 km^{2}), all of it recorded as land.

== Demographics ==
Historical population
Census	Pop.	Note	%±
2010	603		—
2020	523		−13.3%
U.S. Decennial Census

Foxworth first appeared as a census designated place in the 2010 U.S. census.

=== Racial and ethnic composition ===
Foxworth CDP, Mississippi – Racial and ethnic composition Note: the US Census treats Hispanic/Latino as an ethnic category. This table excludes Latinos from the racial categories and assigns them to a separate category. Hispanics/Latinos may be of any race.
Race / Ethnicity (NH = Non-Hispanic)	Pop 2010	Pop 2020	% 2010	% 2020
White alone (NH)	393	322	65.17%	61.57%
Black or African American alone (NH)	194	163	32.17%	31.17%
Native American or Alaska Native alone (NH)	0	1	0.00%	0.19%
Asian alone (NH)	1	1	0.17%	0.19%
Native Hawaiian or Pacific Islander alone (NH)	0	0	0.00%	0.00%
Other race alone (NH)	0	3	0.00%	0.57%
Mixed race or Multiracial (NH)	11	21	1.82%	4.02%
Hispanic or Latino (any race)	4	12	0.66%	2.29%
Total	603	523	100.00%	100.00%

== Education ==
Foxworth is part of the Marion County School District, and the area around Foxworth is the site of two campuses – West Marion Primary School (Grades K–3), and the shared campus of West Marion Elementary (Grades 4–6), and West Marion High School (Grades 7–12). These serve students in rural areas of western Marion County.

Marion County is in the service area of Pearl River Community College.

== Notable people ==
- Earl Poole Ball, singer-songwriter, pianist, actor
- Patrick F. Taylor, businessman and founder of Taylor Energy; operated a Brangus ranch and wildlife management research facility in Foxworth
