= Tylertown, Mississippi =

- Town
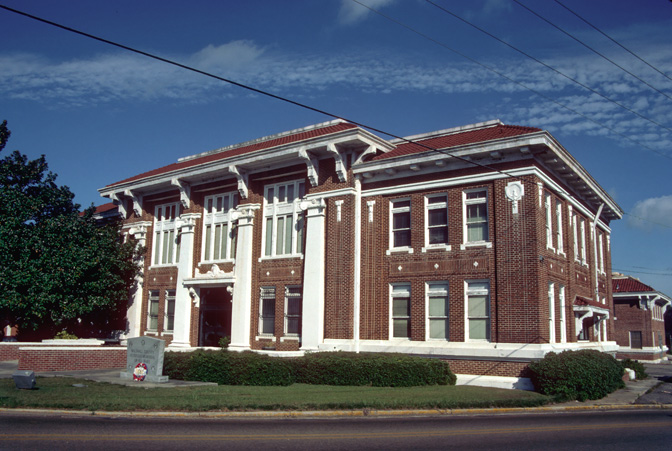
- Walthall County Courthouse (1993)

- Location of Tylertown, Mississippi

- Location in the United States
- Coordinates: 31°6′58″N 90°8′34″W
- Country: United States
- State: Mississippi
- County: Walthall

Area
  - Total: 3.29 sq mi (8.51 km^{2})
  - Land: 3.28 sq mi (8.49 km^{2})
  - Water: 0.0077 sq mi (0.02 km^{2})
- Elevation: 300 ft (90 m)

Population (2020)
  - Total: 1,515
  - Density: 462.0/sq mi (178.38/km^{2})
- Time zone: UTC-6 (Central (CST))
  - Summer (DST): UTC-5 (CDT)
- ZIP code: 39667
- Area code: 601
- FIPS code: 28-75160
- GNIS feature ID: 0690939
- Website: https://www.walthallchamber.com/town-of-tylertown.html

Tylertown is a town in and the county seat of Walthall County, Mississippi, United States. Its population was 1,515 at the 2020 census. It is approximately fifty-five miles southwest from the Hattiesburg metropolitan area.

== History ==
The town of Tylertown was first known as the Magee Settlement. It was settled by emigrants of the Magee and Thornhill families, who came from South Carolina. J. Thornhill acquired the first tract of land for the settlement on September 20, 1816, after Native Americans were pushed out of the area. Cullen Conerly went there in 1850 and bought out the Garland Hart store and established a post office which was called Conerly's post office. The store and post office served as the social center of the community for over a half century.

The town bore the name Conerly's from 1848 to 1879. It was renamed as Tyler Town in honor of William G. Tyler; the name was shortened to one word in 1894. Cullen Conerly sold his mercantile interest to his brother-in-law Benjamin Lampton. He laid the foundation of the mercantile business of Tylertown. Tylertown was part of Pike County until 1912, when Walthall County was formed from Pike and Marion counties. The Tylertown Times (local newspaper) was started in 1907. Tylertown Insurance Agency, Inc. has been serving Tylertown's insurance needs since 1924. Luter's Supply, established in 1944, is a retail center for tubs, showers, and whirlpools. Jones Furniture opened in 1939. Tylertown's oldest pharmacy, Pigott's Drug Store, has been around since 1919. WTYL radio station came to Tylertown in 1969.

An interesting story about Tylertown and Walthall County was related in Maury Klein's book "A Call to Arms" (Bloomsbury Press, Paperback edition, 2015). It seems that during World War II, the production and growing of food became problematic as both the United States and its allies were in need of great amounts of food. Production was lagging and crops were rotting in the fields for lack of crop pickers - farm laborers either marched off to war or to factories where wages were far superior to those earned picking cotton - and the need for more of everything was needed. Walthall County responded to the call to grow more of everything. The farmers left behind produced what was termed "barn-bursting harvests, including 23 percent more cotton, 146 percent more hay, 110 percent more eggs, and a whopping 619 percent more truck crops. To celebrate, they decided to hold a "Food for Freedom Thanksgiving" early in October in Tylertown (population 1,100) the county seat and only post office".

According to Klein, the farming crowd came together in Tylertown and came bearing 5,000 fried chickens, 350 turkeys and enough food to feed a small army. Claude Wickard, head of the Food Requirements Committee, appeared in Tylertown that day and extolled the virtues of the small farmer and told them that their endeavors were the "only road that leads to victory". Klein, p. 449.

On March 15, 2025, a violent EF4 tornado struck near the community, killing five people. A second tornado struck Tylertown on a similar path around 30 minutes later at EF3 intensity, causing another fatality.

== Geography ==
Tylertown is located at 31°6′58″N 90°8′34″W (31.116209, -90.142817).

According to the United States Census Bureau, the town has a total area of 3.1 square miles (8.0 km^{2}), of which 3.0 square miles (7.8 km^{2}) is land and 0.33% is water.

== Demographics ==
Historical population
| Census | Pop. | Note | %± |
|---|---|---|---|
| 1910 | 795 | | — |
| 1920 | 1,116 | | 40.4% |
| 1930 | 1,102 | | −1.3% |
| 1940 | 1,376 | | 24.9% |
| 1950 | 1,331 | | −3.3% |
| 1960 | 1,532 | | 15.1% |
| 1970 | 1,736 | | 13.3% |
| 1980 | 1,976 | | 13.8% |
| 1990 | 1,938 | | −1.9% |
| 2000 | 1,910 | | −1.4% |
| 2010 | 1,609 | | −15.8% |
| 2020 | 1,515 | | −5.8% |
U.S. Decennial Census

=== 2020 census ===
As of the 2020 census, Tylertown had a population of 1,515, with 585 households and 382 families residing in the town.

The median age was 45.1 years. 20.7% of residents were under the age of 18 and 25.6% were 65 years of age or older. For every 100 females, there were 82.8 males, and for every 100 females age 18 and over, there were 82.0 males age 18 and over.

0.0% of residents lived in urban areas, while 100.0% lived in rural areas.

Of the town's households, 29.9% had children under the age of 18 living in them. Of all households, 36.4% were married-couple households, 19.8% were households with a male householder and no spouse or partner present, and 39.3% were households with a female householder and no spouse or partner present. About 35.6% of all households were made up of individuals, and 17.6% had someone living alone who was 65 years of age or older.

There were 753 housing units, of which 22.3% were vacant. The homeowner vacancy rate was 6.4% and the rental vacancy rate was 15.8%.

Tylertown racial composition
| Race | Num. | Perc. |
|---|---|---|
| White (non-Hispanic) | 822 | 54.26% |
| Black or African American (non-Hispanic) | 609 | 40.2% |
| Native American | 5 | 0.33% |
| Asian | 25 | 1.65% |
| Pacific Islander | 1 | 0.07% |
| Other/Mixed | 29 | 1.91% |
| Hispanic or Latino | 24 | 1.58% |

=== 2000 census ===
As of the census of 2000, there were 1,910 people, 707 households, and 461 families residing in the town. The population density was 625.9 inhabitants per square mile (241.7/km^{2}). There were 825 housing units at an average density of 270.3 per square mile (104.4/km^{2}). The racial makeup of the town was 56.34% White, 41.41% African American, 0.16% Native American, 0.84% Asian, 0.47% from other races, and 0.79% from two or more races. Hispanic or Latino of any race were 1.10% of the population.

There were 707 households, out of which 31.5% had children under the age of 18 living with them, 40.5% were married couples living together, 21.6% had a female householder with no husband present, and 34.7% were non-families. 32.2% of all households were made up of individuals, and 18.4% had someone living alone who was 65 years of age or older. The average household size was 2.47 and the average family size was 3.15.

In the town, the population was spread out, with 26.6% under the age of 18, 9.1% from 18 to 24, 21.6% from 25 to 44, 20.2% from 45 to 64, and 22.6% who were 65 years of age or older. The median age was 39 years. For every 100 females, there were 75.6 males. For every 100 females age 18 and over, there were 69.5 males.

The median income for a household in the town was $20,515, and the median income for a family was $30,125. Males had a median income of $30,625 versus $16,094 for females. The per capita income for the town was $13,712. About 28.9% of families and 32.3% of the population were below the poverty line, including 48.0% of those under age 18 and 18.2% of those age 65 or over.

== Education ==
Tylertown is served by the Walthall County School District.

The schools are Tylertown High School, and Salem Attendance Center.

== Notable people ==
- Ruby Bridges, civil rights activist
- Melerson Guy Dunham, civil rights and women's rights activist
- Jon Hinson, U.S. Representative and gay rights activist
- Lester Holmes, NFL offensive lineman
- George T. Johnson, NBA player
- Jameon Lewis, professional football player
- Sylvester Magee, purportedly the last living former American slave
