= Morris Hood =

Morris Hood may refer to:

- Morris Hood Jr. (1934–1998), American politician in Michigan
- Morris Hood III (1965–2020), his son, American politician in Michigan
