= William Averill Comstock =

- William Averill Comstock in Topeka, Kansas (1867/1866)
- Born: January 17, 1842; Comstock Township, Michigan
- Died: August 16, 1868 (aged 26); Kansas
- Cause of death: shot by Cheyenne
- Relatives: James Fenimore Cooper (great-uncle); Horace H. Comstock (father)
- Military career
- Branch: United States Army
- Service years: 1865-1868
- Rank: scout
- Nicknames: Medicine Bill, Billy Comstock, Ace of Scouts, Buffalo Bill, Will Comstock
- Unit: 7th U.S. Cavalry
- Conflicts: American Indian Wars

William "Bill" Averill Comstock (January 17, 1842 - August 16, 1868) was an American courier, a military scout who worked for George Armstrong Custer, Winfield Scott Hancock, and Phil Sheridan, and an interpreter between the U.S. Army and the Native Americans who was killed by Cheyenne natives led by Chief Turkey Leg. He famously met Wild Bill Hickok while serving in the 7th U.S. Cavalry and once got into a buffalo-shooting contest over the nickname "Buffalo Bill" with Buffalo Bill Cody.

== Early life ==
William Averill Comstock was born in Comstock, Michigan to Horace Hawkins Comstock (1807–1861) and Sarah Sabina Cooper (1810–1846). Comstock Sr. was the first senator elected from Kalamazoo County and helped worked with Native American and military supply trade from Detroit to Chicago and Sarah was the niece of famed American writer, James Fenimore Cooper.

== Going West ==
In 1860, Bill Comstock was working as a Native American trader in Cottonwood Springs, Nebraska Territory. He became prolific in several Native America languages including Cheyenne and Arapaho and became an interpreter at Fort Wallace, Kansas and the Smoky Hill Trail. During his time as a scout at Fort Wallace, Comstock was an interpreter between Native Americans and the fort's soldiers and became prolific in his rifle, gaining the nicknames "Ace of Scouts" and "Buffalo Bill". During this time, George Armstrong Custer met Comstock and wrote about him in his book My Life on the Plains, he said of Comstock, "No Indian knew the country more thoroughly than did Comstock. He was perfectly familiar with every divide, watercourse, and strip of timber for hundreds of miles in either direction. He knew the dress and peculiarities of every Indian tribe, and spoke the language of many of them.”

He briefly scouted for Fort Halleck, Wyoming, in the fall of 1865, before moving to western Kansas where he settled on Ross Creek Ranch and sold hay to the Fort Wallace and by 1866, Comstock became the Chief of Scouts at Fort Wallace.

=== Buffalo Bill Competition ===
In the summer of 1868, Buffalo Bill Cody, who at the time was a Colonel, challenged Bill Comstock to a Buffalo hunting competition for the nickname "Buffalo Bill" and $500, which Comstock. On the day of the challenge, Comstock and Cody met outside of Monument, Kansas on horseback, Comstock had a Henry repeating rifle whilst Cody had a Springfield Model 1866. The two hunted buffalo for several hours and by its conclusion Cody killed 69 bison whilst Comstock only had 46.

== Death ==
On August 16, 1868, Comstock was ordered by Lieutenant Beecher to negotiate peace with Abner Grover between the U.S. Army and Cheyenne Chief Turkey Leg. The men met at Saline Valley and were ambushed by seven Cheyenne warriors. The warriors killed Comstock and severely wounded Abner, who was able to return to Fort Wallace. Abner and several other soldiers returned to take Comstock's body and buried him in an unknown location.
