= List of shipwrecks in July 1864 =

The list of shipwrecks in July 1864 includes all ships sunk, foundered, grounded, or otherwise lost during July 1864.

== 1 July ==
List of shipwrecks: 1 July 1864
Ship	State	Description
Harriet Stevens	United States	American Civil War: The 463-ton barque, carrying a cargo of lumber, cement, and gum opium from Machias, Maine, to Matanzas, Cuba, was captured, used for target practice, and burned in the North Atlantic Ocean southwest of Bermuda (31°33′N 64°08′W) by the screw sloop-of-war CSS Florida (Confederate States Navy).
Jane and Esther	United Kingdom	The ship ran aground on Chausey, Manche, France and sank. Her crew were rescued. She was on a voyage from Hartlepool, County Durham to Granville, Manche.
Waverley	United Kingdom	The barque was driven ashore and wrecked at Auckland, New Zealand. She was on a voyage from London to Auckland.

== 2 July ==
List of shipwrecks: 2 July 1864
Ship	State	Description
Pearl	United Kingdom	The ship was lost off the Peloponnese, Greece. She was on a voyage from Constanța, Ottoman Empire to London.

== 3 July ==
List of shipwrecks: 3 July 1864
Ship	State	Description
Caroline	United Kingdom	The smack was severely damaged by fire at Millbay, Devon. The fire was extinguished with assistance from Squirrel (Royal Navy).
Corinthian	United Kingdom	The steamship struck a sunken rock and was wrecked south of Viana do Castelo, Portugal. All on board survived. She was on a voyage from Porto, Portugal to Liverpool, Lancashire.
Locust Point	United States	The 462-ton screw steamer sank with the loss of seventeen lives in 84 feet (26 m) of water in the North Atlantic Ocean, between Absecon Lighthouse and Barnegat Lighthouse off Absecon, New Jersey after colliding with Matanzas (Flag unknown).
Margaret	United Kingdom	The barque struck an iceberg in the Atlantic Ocean and was abandoned. Her crew were rescued by the barque Achilles and by Cape Ranger (both United Kingdom). Margaret was on a voyage from Quebec City, Province of Canada, British North America to Berwick upon Tweed, Northumberland.

== 4 July ==
List of shipwrecks: 4 July 1864
Ship	State	Description
Alliance	United Kingdom	The brig foundered in the Black Sea off Cape Maganott, Russia. Her crew were rescued.
Eugenie	United Kingdom	The schooner was run into and sunk by a steamship. Her three crew were rescued. She was on a voyage from Cardigan to Milford Haven, Pembrokeshire.
Irwin	United Kingdom	The ship was wrecked at Shanghai.
Joseph Holmes	United Kingdom	The ship ran aground at Bassein, India. She was on a voyage from Bassein to a European port. She was refloated and put back to Bassein in a leaky condition.
Mariner	United States	American Civil War: The 193-ton sidewheel paddle steamer was burned by Confederate States Army forces on the Mississippi River, near the mouth of the St. Francis River upstream of Helena, Arkansas, where she had been aground on a sandbar since June.
Moussul, or Woosie	United Kingdom	The schooner was run into by Fire Dart (United Kingdom) and sank. Her crew survived. She was on a voyage from Shanghai to Foochow, China.
Osprey	United Kingdom	The schooner departed from Sierra Leone for London. No further trace, presumed foundered with the loss of all hands.
Robert Scott	United Kingdom	The tug sprang a leak and sank off Cellardyke, Fife. She was on a voyage from Leith, Lothian to Kronstadt, Russia. She came ashore 6 nautical miles (11 km) south of Peterhead, Aberdeenshire on 18 September.
Sampson	United Kingdom	The schooner sank in Castlemaine Bay.
Thetis	United Kingdom	The ship ran aground on the Pluckington Bank, in Liverpool Bay. She was on a voyage from Saint John, New Brunswick, British North America to Liverpool.

== 5 July ==
List of shipwrecks: 5 July 1864
Ship	State	Description
Lincluden Castle	United Kingdom	The ship was wrecked off Cape Palmas, Liberia. Her 25 crew survived but the wreck was plundered by the local inhabitants. She was on a voyage from Cardiff, Glamorgan to Fernando Po, Equatorial Guinea.
Surprise	United Kingdom	The fishing smack collided with the steamship St. Elmo (United Kingdom) and sank in the English Channel between Dover and Folkestone, Kent with the loss of two of her crew.

== 6 July ==
List of shipwrecks: 6 July 1864
Ship	State	Description
Eliza Augusta	France	The schooner ran aground on the Goodwin Sands, Kent, United Kingdom. She was on a voyage from Sunderland, County Durham to Pontorson, Manche. She was refloated with the assistance of a tug and taken in to Ramsgate, Kent in a leaky condition.
Pearl	United Kingdom	The ship sank off "Clafonisi Island", Greece. She was on a voyage from Constantinople, Ottoman Empire to London.
Rebecca	United Kingdom	The ship was driven ashore at Lavernock Point, Glamorgan. She was on a voyage from Bristol, Gloucestershire to Neath, Glamorgan. She was refloated and completed her voyage.

== 7 July ==
List of shipwrecks: 7 July 1864
Ship	State	Description
Carolina	Confederate States of America	American Civil War, Union blockade: Attempting to run the Union blockade, the 52-gross register ton sidewheel paddle steamer was wrecked while leaving Galveston, Texas, Confederate States of America.
Matagorda	Confederate States of America	American Civil War, Union blockade: The 1,250-gross register ton sidewheel paddle steamer was forced aground off Galveston Island, Texas, 7 miles (11 km) northeast of San Luis Pass, by the gunboat USS Kanawha (United States Navy) three hours after departing Galveston, Texas to attempt to run the Union blockade with a cargo that included cotton. Kanawha, the gunboat USS Aroostook, and the screw steamer USS Penguin (all United States Navy) shelled her on 8 July when Confederates attempted to salvage her, then personnel in two boats from USS Kanawha and one from USS Penguin boarded her and set her afire. She later was salvaged and returned to Confederate service.
Paragon	United Kingdom	The ship was lost near Cape Sweetnose, Russia. Her ten crew survived She was on a voyage from Montrose, Forfarshire to Arkhangelsk, Russia.

== 8 July ==
List of shipwrecks: 8 July 1864
Ship	State	Description
Galconda	United States	American Civil War: The whaler, a 330-ton barque, returning from a two-year whaling expedition with a cargo of 1,800 barrels of whale oil, was captured and burned in the North Atlantic Ocean (37°28′N 72°00′W) by the screw sloop-of-war CSS Florida (Confederate States Navy).
Planet No. 2	United States	The 58-ton sidewheel paddle steamer crashed into a dock at New Orleans, Louisiana.
Prospect	United Kingdom	The smack ran aground on the Arnott Bank, off the mouth of the River Tay. She was refloated and taken in to Montrose, Forfarshire.
Sebra Crooker	United States	The Barque ran ground on Looe Key and was wrecked.

== 9 July ==
List of shipwrecks: 9 July 1864
Ship	State	Description
Greenland	United States	American Civil War: The 549-ton barque, bound from Philadelphia, Pennsylvania, to Pensacola, Florida, Confederate States of America, with a cargo of coal, was under tow by the tug America (United States) in the North Atlantic Ocean off Cape Henry, Virginia, when the screw sloop-of-war CSS Florida (Confederate States Navy) approached. America cast off Greenland and escaped, and Florida captured and burned Greenland (approx 36°43′N 074°11′W).
Marcantoine	France	The ship collided with Pekin (Hamburg) and sank in the Atlantic Ocean with the loss of a crew member. Survivors were rescued by Pekin. Marcantoine was on a voyage from Marseille, Bouches-du-Rhône to Réunion.
Margaret Littlejohn	United Kingdom	The ship was run into by the steamship Black Diamond (United Kingdom) and was holed at Sunderland, County Durham. She was beached, the hole repaired and she was refloated.
Margaret Y. Davis	United States	American Civil War: The schooner, in ballast, was captured and burned in the North Atlantic Ocean off Cape Henry by the screw sloop-of-war CSS Florida (Confederate States Navy).
Maria das Dorce	Brazil	The ship was wrecked on the English Bank, in the River Plate. She was on a voyage from Paranaguá to Montevideo, Uruguay.
Speedy	United Kingdom	The ship collided with Conqueror (United Kingdom) and sank in Plymouth Sound. Her crew were rescued by Conqueror. Speedy was on a voyage from Porthallow, Cornwall to Plymouth, Devon.

== 10 July ==
List of shipwrecks: 10 July 1864
Ship	State	Description
Carrier	United Kingdom	The schooner was driven ashore at the Rammekens Castle, Vlissingen, Zeeland, Netherlands. She was on a voyage from Antwerp, Belgium to London. She was refloated and resumed her voyage.
Electric Spark	United States	American Civil War: During a voyage from New YOrk to Havana, Cuba, carrying 43 passengers and a cargo of assorted merchandise, dry goods, shoes, boots, fine provisions, wines, liquors, postage stamps, mail, gold specie, cash, and bank notes, the 810-ton screw steamer was captured in the North Atlantic Ocean off the coast of Maryland by the screw sloop-of-war CSS Florida (Confederate States Navy). Florida scuttled Electric Spark. One Florida crewmen died when one of Florida's boats was swamped during the capture.
Elizabeth Buckley	Flag unknown	Carrying a cargo of lumber, the schooner was stranded at Point Arena, California, Confederate States of America, with the loss of one life.
General Berry	United States	American Civil War: The 469- or 1,197-ton barque, carrying a cargo of hay and straw from Maine to Fortress Monroe in Virginia, Confederate States of America, was captured and burned in the North Atlantic Ocean 35 nautical miles (65 km) off the coast of Maryland (37°33′N 74°20′W) by the screw sloop-of-war CSS Florida (Confederate States Navy).
Governor Milton	United States	American Civil War: The armed tug became disabled while transporting Union Army troops on the South Fork of the Edisto River in South Carolina, Confederate States of America and was burned at the mouth of the river to prevent her capture by Confederate forces.
Mouche No. 4	France	The steamboat heeled over in the Saône with the loss of 35 to 40 lives. She was on a voyage from Perrache to Vaise, Rhône.
Virgin	Confederate States of America	American Civil War, Union blockade: The steamer, a large blockade runner, was discovered aground on the coast of Mobile Bay near Fort Morgan, Alabama, Confederate States of America by the broadside ironclad USS Galena, sidewheel gunboat USS Sebago, and screw sloops-of-war USS Lackawanna and USS Monongahela (all United States Navy), all of which opened fire on her. However, the Confederates towed her to safety on 11 July.
Zelinda	United States	American Civil War: During a voyage in ballast from Matanzas, Cuba to Philadelphia, Pennsylvania, the 559-ton barque was captured and burned in the North Atlantic Ocean 3 nautical miles (5.6 km) off the coast of Maryland by the screw sloop-of-war CSS Florida (Confederate States Navy).

== 11 July ==
List of shipwrecks: 11 July 1864
Ship	State	Description
Edward Phelan	United Kingdom	The ship ran aground off Morriscastle County Wexford. She was on a voyage from Runcorn, Cheshire to New Ross, County Wexford. She was refloated and found to be leaky.

== 12 July ==
List of shipwrecks: 12 July 1864
Ship	State	Description
Earl Canning	United Kingdom	The ship was sighted in the Indian Ocean whilst on a voyage from Rangoon, Burma to Liverpool, Lancashire. No further trace, presumed foundered with the loss of all hands.
Sisters	United Kingdom	The ship put in to Whitby, Yorkshire in a sinking condition. She was on a voyage from Middlesbrough, Yorkshire to Harburg.

== 13 July ==
List of shipwrecks: 13 July 1864
Ship	State	Description
John Edward	United Kingdom	The barque was driven ashore and wrecked 24 nautical miles (44 km) form Sagua La Grande, Cuba.
Sea Park	United Kingdom	The ship was abandoned in the South Atlantic (25°13′S 40°58′W). Her crew took to three boats; The pinnace landed at Paranaguá, Brazil on 17 July. The twelve crew in the longboat and lifeboat were rescued by the barque Fraternidade (Brazil). Sea Park was on a voyage from Liverpool, Lancashire to Callao, Peru.

== 14 July ==
List of shipwrecks: 14 July 1864
Ship	State	Description
Canton	United Kingdom	The brig was driven ashore at Garrucha, Spain. She was refloated with the assistance of a Spanish Navy warship.
HDMS Dannebrog	Royal Danish Navy	The ironclad frigate ran aground off Aarhus. She was refloated the next day.
J. T. Wright	United Kingdom	The steamship was wrecked on the Lanshan Crossing Sandbank, in the Yangtze in a typhoon.
Oromocto	United Kingdom	The barque ran aground off Filey, Yorkshire. She was being towed from Hull, Yorkshire to South Shields, County Durham by the tug Robert Scott (United Kingdom. She was refloated and resumed her voyage under tow.
Rebecca	United Kingdom	The schooner sank in the Yangtze in a typhoon with the loss of two lives.
Syrian	United Kingdom	The barque was wrecked in the Yangtze in a typhoon with loss of life. She was on a voyage from Nagasaki, Japan to Shanghai, China.

== 15 July ==
List of shipwrecks: 15 July 1864
Ship	State	Description
Atlantic	United Kingdom	The schooner was driven ashore between Helsingborg and Viken, Sweden. She was on a voyage from Saint Petersburg, Russia to Cork. She was refloated and taken in to Helsingør, Denmark.
Baron Helburg	Denmark	The barque was driven ashore between Helsingborg and Viken. She was on a voyage from Sundsvall, Sweden to London United Kingdom, She was refloated with the assistance of a Swedish vessel and taken into Helsingør.
Cherokee	United States	American Civil War: The 261-ton sidewheel paddle steamer was burned by Confederate agents on the Mississippi River at St. Louis, Missouri.
Cubano	United Kingdom	The barque was destroyed by fire at Brooklyn, New York United States.
Edward F. Dix	United States	American Civil War: The 296-ton sidewheel paddle steamer was burned by Confederate agents on the Mississippi River at St. Louis. She was repaired and returned to service.
Glasgow	United States	American Civil War: The 340-ton sidewheel paddle steamer was burned by Confederate agents on the Mississippi River at St. Louis.
Good Intent	United Kingdom	The brig was driven ashore between Helsingborg and Viken. She was on a voyage from Kronstadt, Russia to London. She was refloated and taken in to Helsingør.
Lewis Breme	United Kingdom	The barque was destroyed by fire at Brooklyn.
Marguerite	United Kingdom	The full-rigged ship ran aground in the Hooghly River. She was on a voyage from Liverpool, Lancashire, United Kingdom to Calcutta, India.
Marie Catharina	France	The barque was driven ashore and wrecked 2 nautical miles (3.7 km) north of Kennery, India. She was on a voyage from Bordeaux, Gironde to Bombay, India.
Nare	United States	Bound from New York to Santa Marta, Venezuela, the steamer sank an hour after springing a leak. The crew abandoned ship in two boats. One boat disappeared; the survivors aboard the other boat were rescued by the barque Sicilian (Flag unknown).
Northerner	United States	American Civil Wa: The 332-ton sidewheel paddle steamer was burned by Confederate agents on the Mississippi River at St. Louis.
Sunshine	United States	American Civil War: The 354-ton sidewheel paddle steamer was burned by Confederate agents on the Mississippi River at St. Louis.
Welcome	United States	American Civil War: The 499-ton sidewheel paddle steamer was burned by Confederate agents on the Mississippi River at St. Loui.
Three unnamed vessels	Flags unknown	A full-rigged ship, a brig and a schooner were driven ashore between Helsingborg and Viken. They were refloated and resumed their voyages.

== 16 July ==
List of shipwrecks: 16 July 1864
Ship	State	Description
J. E. H.	(United Kingdom of Great Britain and Ireland) Victoria	The ship departed from Melbourne for London. No further trace, presumed foundered with the loss of all on board.
Tolerancia	Brazil	The barque was wrecked at the mouth of the River Plate.
Unnamed	Flag unknown	The schooner ran aground on the Goodwin Sands, Kent, United Kingdom.

== 17 July ==
List of shipwrecks: 17 July 1864
Ship	State	Description
McLeod	United Kingdom	The full-rigged ship ran aground in the Hooghly River. She was on a voyage from Calcutta, India to London. She was refloated and resumed her voyage.

== 18 July ==
List of shipwrecks: 18 July 1864
Ship	State	Description
Saint Louis	United States	The 191-ton sternwheel paddle steamer was burned by Confederate guerrillas at Sailor's Rest on the Cumberland River upstream of Fort Donelson, Tennessee.

== 19 July ==
List of shipwrecks: 19 July 1864
Ship	State	Description
Boston	United States	The brigantine was wrecked on the Horseshoe Reef, off Prospect, Nova Scotia, British North America. She was on a voyage from Halifax, Nova Scotia to Boston, Massachusetts.
Laura	United Kingdom	The ship sprang a leak and was beached at Calvario, Portugal. She was on a voyage from Pomaron, Portugal to Ipswich, Suffolk. She had been repaired and had resumed her voyage by 31 July.

== 20 July ==
List of shipwrecks: 20 July 1864
Ship	State	Description
Ronechan	United Kingdom	The ship ran aground in Coatsdyke Bay. She was on a voyage from Quebec City, Province of Canada, British North America to Port Glasgow, Renfrewshire. She was refloated and put back to Quebec City.
HMS Rose	Royal Navy	The survey vessel was driven ashore and wrecked. All on board survived.

== 21 July ==
List of shipwrecks: 21 July 1864
Ship	State	Description
B. M. Runyon	United States Army	The 443-ton sidewheel transport struck a snag and sank in the Mississippi River at the foot of Island No 84 near Skipwith's Landing, Mississippi, and Gaines Landing, Arkansas, with the loss of about 70 to 150 men.
Constitution	United Kingdom	The ship ran aground on the Arklow Bank, in the Irish Sea off the coast of County Wexford. She was on a voyage from Liverpool, Lancashire to New York, United States. She was refloated with the assistance of two tugs and towed in to Liverpool, where she arrived on 23 July.
Duiveland	Netherlands	The ship was severely damaged by fire and was scuttled at Belém, Portugal. She was on a voyage from London, United Kingdom to Boston, Massachusetts, United States. She was refloated on 1 August.
Lela Mansfield	United Kingdom	The ship ran aground and sank at Wexford. She was on a voyage from St. Stephen, New Brunswick, British North America to Liverpool, Lancashire.
St. Stephen	United Kingdom	The ship ran aground at Wexford.
Unnamed	United Kingdom	The ship ran aground on The Platters, off the coast of Anglesey and sank. She was on a voyage from Porthewan, Cornwall to Runcorn, Cheshire.

== 22 July ==
List of shipwrecks: 22 July 1864
Ship	State	Description
Avocat	France	The brig was wrecked at Guimbering, Senegal.
Sea Mew	United Kingdom	The schooner struck the pier and sank at Douglas, Isle of Man. She was on a voyage from Whitehaven, Cumberland to Arklow, County Wicklow. She was refloated in early August and taken in to Douglas.
Tynemouth	United Kingdom	The ship ran aground on the Cross Sand, in the North Sea off the coast of Norfolk. She was refloated and resumed her voyage.

== 23 July ==
List of shipwrecks: 23 July 1864
Ship	State	Description
B. M. Runyan	United States Army	American Civil War: The transport, carrying about 500 Union Army and civilian personnel, sank after striking a snag in the Mississippi River near Skipwith's Landing, Mississippi. The sternwheel paddle steamer USS Prairie Bird (United States Navy) rescued about 350 survivors.
Gazelle	United States	Bound for Portsmouth, New Hampshire, with a cargo of coal, the schooner struck a rock and sank in the North Atlantic Ocean off Thacher Island, Massachusetts.
Golden Pledge	United Kingdom	The paddle steamer was run into by the steamship Cognac and sank in the River Mersey with the loss of three of her sixteen crew. She was on a voyage from Liverpool, Lancashire to Havana, Cuba.
Hibernia	United States	The ship ran aground on the Haisborough Sands, in the North Sea off the coast of Norfolk, United Kingdom. She was on a voyage from "Howland's Island" to Leith, Lothian, United Kingdom. She was refloated and taken in to Great Yarmouth, Norfolk in a leaky condition.
Kingston	United States	American Civil War: The steamer ran aground on the shore of the Chesapeake Bay between Smith's Point and Windmill Point, Virginia, Confederate States of America. She was captured and burned on 24 July by Confederate guerrillas.
Panama	United Kingdom	The brig ran aground on the Beach Cay Reef, in the Bahamas. She was on a voyage from Havana, to Falmouth, Cornwall. She was refloated on 29 July and taken in to Nassau, Bahamas.
Pfeil	Prussia	The schooner was driven ashore at Curzola, Austrian Empire. She was refloated.
Sir Colin	United Kingdom	The ship struck the Maidens Rocks, in Belfast Lough and sank. Her crew survived. She was on a voyage from Larne, County Antrim to Glasgow, Renfrewshire.

== 24 July ==
List of shipwrecks: 24 July 1864
Ship	State	Description
B. T. Martin	United States	American Civil War, Union blockade: After her capture by the privateer York (Confederate States of America) in the North Atlantic Ocean 110 nautical miles (200 km) east of Cape Hatteras, North Carolina, Confederate States of America, during a voyage from Philadelphia, Pennsylvania, to Havana, Cuba, with a cargo of potatoes, a complete sugar mill, and three large iron tanks, the brig was beached by her Confederate prize crew near Chicamacomico, North Carolina. The Confederates were still stripping B. T. Martin and removing her cargo when the armed screw steamer USS Union (United States Navy) approached on 28 July, prompting them to burn B. T. Martin to prevent Union from recapturing her.
Clara Bell, or Clarabell	United States	American Civil War: The 200-ton sidewheel paddle steamer was damaged by Confederate States Army artillery fire on the White River, then was run onto the riverbank at Caroline Landing, Mississippi, Confederate States of America and finally burned after being set afire by more artillery fire when Confederate forces pursued her to Louisiana Bend on the Mississippi River.
Gazelle	United States	Bound for Portsmouth, New Hampshire, with a cargo of coal, the schooner struck a rock and sank in the North Atlantic Ocean off Thacher Island, Massachusetts.
Jessie	United Kingdom	The gabbart sank in the Clyde. Her two crew survived. She was on a voyage from Port Dundas, Renfrewshire to Dalquhurn, Dunbartonshire.
Julius	United Kingdom	The schooner was wrecked near Cape Hatteras, North Carolina, Confederate States of America. She was on a voyage from Cardiff, Glamorgan to Baltimore, Maryland, United States.
Kingston	United States	American Civil War: The 200-ton sidewheel paddle steamer ran aground on the shore of the Chesapeake Bay in the Diamond Marshes between Smith Point and Windmill Point, Virginia Confederate States of America and was captured and burned by Confederate guerrillas.

== 25 July ==
List of shipwrecks: 25 July 1864
Ship	State	Description
Castle Howard	United Kingdom	The ship departed from Shanghai, China for London. No further trace, presumed foundered with the loss of all hands, between 20 and 30 people.
Island City	United States	Carrying a cargo of corn for the Northwestern Indian Expedition, the 139-ton sternwheel paddle steamer struck a snag and sank in the Missouri River across from Fort Buford in Dakota Territory.
Lizzie Dransfield	United Kingdom	The ship was wrecked at Sagres Point, Portugal. Her crew were rescued. She was on a voyage from Antwerp, Belgium to Seville, Spain.
Monitor	United States	Under tow by the steamer Christina (United States) and carrying a cargo of hay and a wagon, the barge burned and sank in the Sacramento River two miles (3.2 km) downstream from Rio Vista, California, Confederate States of America.
USS Undine	United States Navy	American Civil War: The tinclad sternwheel paddle steamer struck a snag and sank in the Tennessee River near Clifton, Tennessee. She was refloated on 31 July and was repaired and returned to service.

== 26 July ==
List of shipwrecks: 26 July 1864
Ship	State	Description
Freir	Norway	The barque was driven ashore and damaged near "Wiken", Sweden. She was on a voyage from Danzig to Liverpool, Lancashire, United Kingdom. She was refloated and taken in to Helsingør, Denmark.
Harlequin	United Kingdom	The brig sprang a leak and sank in the North Sea. Her crew were rescued. She was on a voyage from Liverpool to Vyborg, Grand Duchy of Finland.

== 27 July ==
List of shipwrecks: 27 July 1864
Ship	State	Description
Sweden	Sweden	The schooner ran aground on the Swinebottoms, in the Baltic Sea. She was on a voyage from Gävle to London, United Kingdom. She was refloated and taken in to Helsingør, Denmark in a leaky condition.

== 28 July ==
List of shipwrecks: 28 July 1864
Ship	State	Description
Eendracht	Netherlands	The brig ran aground off Dragør, Denmark. She was refloated and resumed her voyage.
Lilly, or Tilly	United Kingdom	The smack was wrecked off "Dumanoe". Her crew were rescued. She was on a voyage from Killybegs to The Rosses, County Donegal.
Nereus	Sweden	The schooner was wrecked on Arenas Key, off the coast of Cuba. Her crew were rescued. She was on a voyage from Sunderland, County Durham, United Kingdom to Havana, Cuba.

== 29 July ==
List of shipwrecks: 29 July 1864
Ship	State	Description
Active	United Kingdom	The ship was driven ashore at Hamra, Sweden. She was on a voyage from Hull to Riga, Russia. She had been refloated by 4 August and taken in to Slitohamn.
Friar Thussen	Norway	The ship ran aground on the Swinebottoms, in the Baltic Sea and was wrecked. She was on a voyage from Danzig to Liverpool, Lancashire, United Kingdom.
Lurline	United Kingdom	The yacht struck a rock off Jersey, Channel Islands and was holed. She put in to Saint Brelade for repairs.
Mosquito	United States	Carrying a cargo of wood, the barge struck a snag and sank in the Sacramento River at the foot of I Street in Sacramento, California.
Richard Young	United Kingdom	The ship foundered in the Kattegat. Her crew were rescued. She was on a voyage from South Shields, County Durham to Kronstadt, Russia.

== 30 July ==
List of shipwrecks: 30 July 1864
Ship	State	Description
Henry Ames	United States	The 777-ton sidewheel paddle steamer struck a snag and sank in the Mississippi River about 7 miles (11 km) above Cairo, Illinois. She later was refloated.
Laura	(United Kingdom of Great Britain and Ireland) British North America	The ship was wrecked on Burche's Look-out Reef, in the Caicos Islands. She was on a voyage from New York, United States to Port-au-Prince, Haiti.
Meteor	United Kingdom	The yacht struck the Wistlan Rock, off the coast of Caernarfonshire and sank. Her crew were rescued.
Sardine	United Kingdom	The whaler struck an iceberg in the Greenland Sea (80°35′N 7°30′W) and was abandoned by her crew. A message in a bottle washed up at Buckie, Moray on 26 August giving the news.

== 31 July ==
List of shipwrecks: 31 July 1864
Ship	State	Description
Adonis	Denmark	The schooner ran aground off Middle Point, Cornwall, United Kingdom. She was on a voyage from Pernambuco, Brazil to Liverpool, Lancashire, United Kingdom. She was refloated.
Clarendon	United Kingdom	The ship sprang a leak and was beached on the Pennington Spit, Hampshire. She was on a voyage from London to "La Rieux". She was refloated and taken in to Yarmouth, Isle of Wight.
Concordia	United Kingdom	The ship was driven ashore at St. Margaret's Bay, Kent. She was on a voyage from New York, United States to London. She was refloated and resumed her voyage.
Esmok	United Kingdom	The ship was driven ashore near Cherbourg, Seine-Inférieure, France. She was on a voyage from Calicut, India to London. She was refloated with assistance from a steamship and resumed her voyage.
Fairy Queen	United Kingdom	The steamship ran aground west of Boulogne, Pas-de-Calais, France. She was on a voyage from Dieppe, Seine-Inférieure, France to Grimsby, Lincolnshire. She was refloated and taken in to Boulogne in a leaky condition.
Japonica	Netherlands	The schooner was wrecked on a reef east of Dewakan Island, Netherlands East Indies. She was on a voyage from Makassar, Netherlands East Indies to Macao, China.
Jessie Duncan	United Kingdom	The ship ran aground on the Pluckington Bank, in Liverpool Bay. She was on a voyage from New York, United States to Liverpool, Lancashire. She was refloated and taken in to Liverpool.
Lauriston	United Kingdom	The ship was wrecked on the Arklow Bank, in the Irish Sea off the coast of County Wicklow with the loss of her captain. She was on a voyage from Cardiff, Glamorgan to Dublin.
Perseverant	France	The barque ran aground on the Longsand, in the North Sea off the coast of Essex, United Kingdom. She was on a voyage from Gothenburg, Sweden to Calais. She was refloated on 3 August and assisted in to Harwich, Essex in a severely leaky condition.
Presto	United Kingdom	The barque was driven ashore at Seaford, Sussex. She was on a voyage from Miramichi, New Brunswick, British North America to Hull, Yorkshire. She was refloated and taken in to Newhaven, Sussex.
Thistle	United States	The 210-ton sternwheel towboat struck a snag and sank in the Ohio River near Big Hurricane Island.

== Unknown date ==
List of shipwrecks: Unknown date in July 1864
Ship	State	Description
Agathe	Kingdom of Hanover	The ship foundered 30 nautical miles (56 km) off Cape St. Vincent, Portugal before 15 July. Her crew were rescued by Olaf Kyroe (Flag unknown). Agathe was on a voyage from Pomaron, Portugal to Ipswich, Suffolk, United Kingdom.
Alliance	United Kingdom	The full-rigged ship was wrecked at the mouth of the Thanlwin.
Ann Best	United Kingdom	The ship struck a rock and sank in the Essequibo River. She was on a voyage from Demerara, British Guiana to Liverpool, Lancashire.
Australia	Grand Duchy of Oldenburg	The ship ran agrounde in the Kangean Islands, Netherlands East Indies before 21 July and was plundered by pirates.
Bonita	United Kingdom	The barque was wrecked before 12 July. She was on a voyage from Boston to Havana, Cuba.
Chariot of Fame	United Kingdom	The ship ran aground in the Hooghly River and was damaged. She was on a voyage from Auckland, New Zealand to Calcutta, India. She was refloated and taken in to Calcutta.
Charlotte	Hamburg	The schooner was wrecked on a reef off "Lahemehe" with the loss of all hands. She was on a voyage from "Jamsa", Navigator Islands to the Fiji Islands.
Diana	(United Kingdom of Great Britain and Ireland) Victoria	The schooner was wrecked on Seaman's Reef, in the Torres Strait. Her crew were rescued.
Greetje Degroot	Flag unknown	The ship was wrecked on Bornholm, Denmark. She was on a voyage form Havre de Grâce, Seine-Inférieure, France to Narva Russia.
Hankley	United Kingdom	The ship ran aground on the Haisborough Sands in the North Sea off the coast of Norfolk. She was on a voyage from Danzig to London.
Hartley	United Kingdom	The brig sprang a leak and was beached at Bowmore, Islay. She was on a voyage from Liverpool, Lancashire to South Shields, County Durham. She was refloated on 5 August and taken in to Bowmore.
Henry Kneeland	United States	The 304-ton whaler was lost in ice in the Chukchi Sea.
Hydra	Italy	The ship was wrecked at Ensenada, Argentina. She was on a voyage from Genoa to Buenos Aires, Argentina.
Isle of May	United Kingdom	The ship was wrecked in the Gaspar Strait. She was on a voyage from Hobart, Tasmania to Singapore, Straits Settlements.
John Parkinson	United Kingdom	The ship was wrecked on Inagua, Bahamas.
John T. Wright	United States	The sidewheel paddle steamer was wrecked at Lanshan Crossing on the Yangtze River, China.
Kate	United States	American Civil War: During a river voyage] from New Orleans to Brashear City, Louisiana, Confederate States of America with a cargo of 130 tons of coal, the schooner was seized and burned by Confederate forces and sank across from Lost Island, Louisiana.
Keepsake	United Kingdom	The ship was wrecked on "Sara Island", in the Timor Sea in early July. She was on a voyage from Shanghai, China to a European port.
Magdalena	Courland Governorate	The ship ran aground on a reef in the Baltic Sea off Cape Arkona, Prussia. She was on a voyage from Ventava to Leith, Lothian, United Kingdom. She was refloated and taken in to Stralsund, where she arrived on 26 July in a leaky condition.
Marechal Pellisier	France	The brig collided with another vessel and was abandoned in early July. Her crew were rescued. She was on a voyage from Port-au-Prince, Haiti to "Mariganana Island".
Minerva	Chile	The ship was wrecked on the Arancaman Coast.
Prospero	United States	The full-rigged ship was wrecked at Chañaral, Chile before 6 July with the loss of six of her crew.
Ramilles	United Kingdom	The brig was abandoned in the Atlantic Ocean before 20 July.
Rebecca	United Kingdom	The schooner was wrecked on the Langesol with loss of life.
Sampson	United Kingdom	The ship was wrecked at Dingle, County Kerry. She was on a voyage from Tralee, County Kerry to Bristol, Gloucestershire.
Sydat	United Kingdom	The barque was wrecked on the Langesol with loss of life. She was on a voyage from Nagasaki, Japan to Shanghai, China.
