= F. Dora Wade =

American politician

F. Dora Wade was an American teacher and state legislator in Mississippi. He represented Yazoo County in the Mississippi House of Representatives. He served as marshal of Yazoo City in 1870 and was documented as a teacher in that year's census.

He was born in Ohio. He was literate, and documented as mulatto.

Martha Jane, the daughter of Tazewell Jones (a politician), accused him of fathering her "illegitimate" child and he was arrested and a court case commenced over the matter. His seat was declared vacant in October 1873 because he resided in Issaquena County, outside the district.

== See also ==
- African American officeholders from the end of the Civil War until before 1900
