= Duncansby, Mississippi =

Unincorporated community in Mississippi, United States

- Ghost town
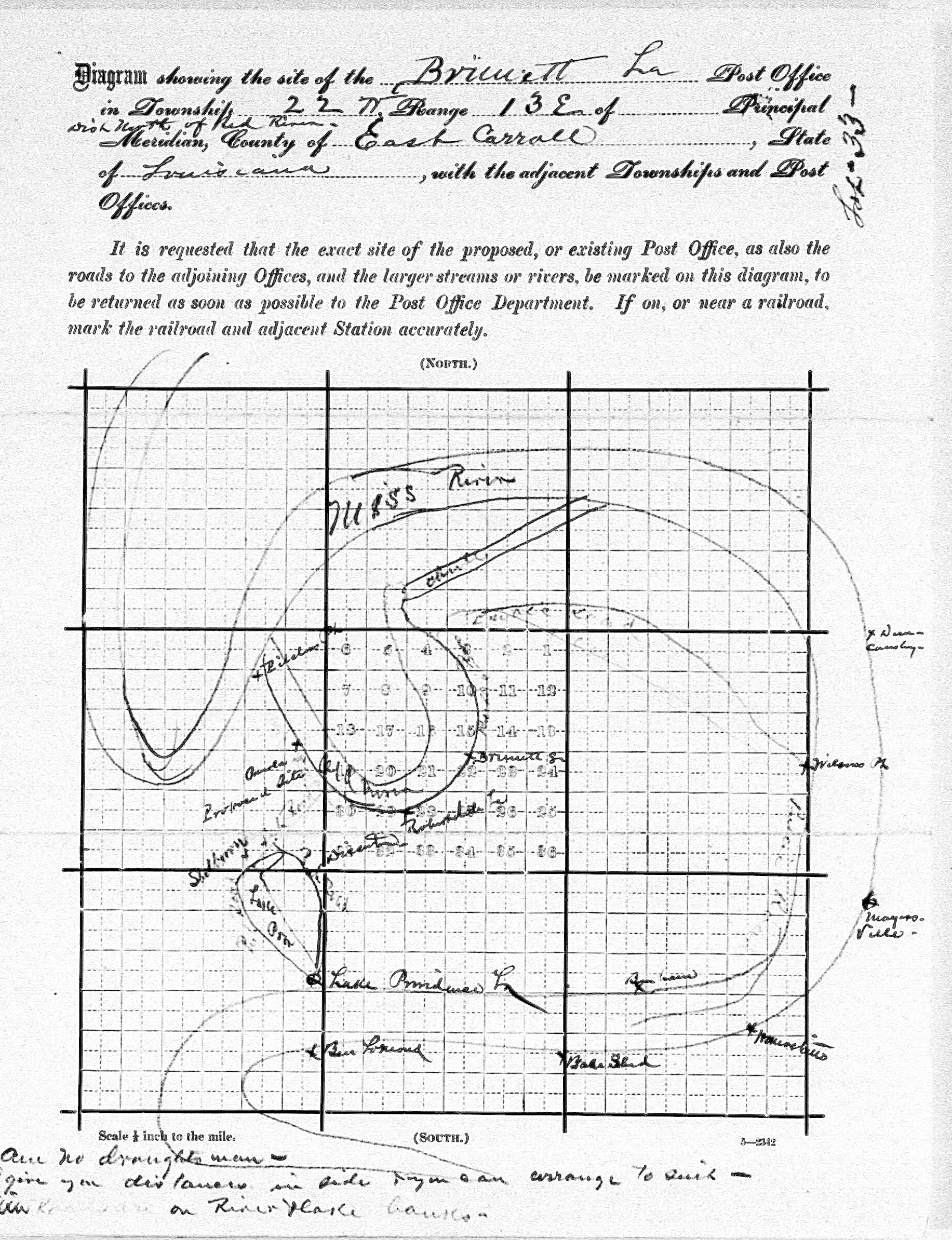
- Locations in East Carroll Parish, Louisiana, and Issaquena County, Mississippi; Duncansby on far right

- Location within Mississippi Location within the United States
- Coordinates: 32°57′51″N 91°04′47″W
- Country: United States
- State: Mississippi
- County: Issaquena
- Elevation: 102 ft (31 m)
- Time zone: UTC-6 (Central (CST))
  - Summer (DST): UTC-5 (CDT)
- GNIS feature ID: 687591

Duncansby is a ghost town in Issaquena County, Mississippi, United States.

Duncansby was located on a stretch of the Mississippi River known as Duncansby Chute.

== History ==
In 1844, nearby Skipwith became the first county seat. In 1848, the county seat was moved to Duncansby. Later that year, the county seat was moved to Tallula.

In 1887, the town had about 100 residents, several stores, and three fraternal organizations. However, the construction of the Louisville, New Orleans and Texas Railway had already led to a significant decrease in the use of the River port at Duncansby. In 1900, Duncansby had two churches, and a population of 157. A post office operated from 1874 to 1919.

During the 19th century, the town erected dikes to reduce river flooding. The U.S. Army Corps of Engineers began construction of the Sarah Cutoff in 1935, which created Old River Chute, an oxbow lake, and removed Duncansby from the contiguous Mississippi River.

Nothing remains of the former community.
