= Stephanie Chang =

American politician from Michigan (born 1983)

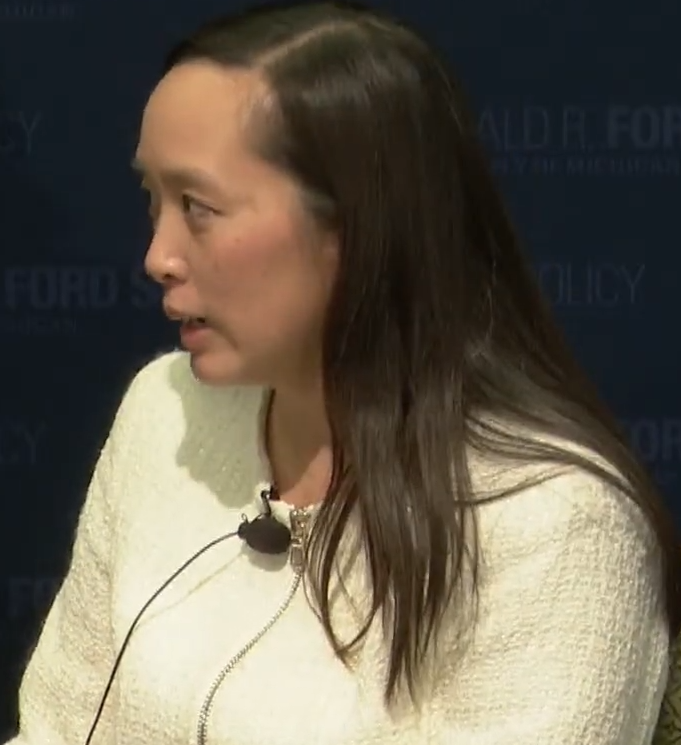
- Chang in 2026

Member of the Michigan Senate
- Incumbent
- Assumed office January 1, 2019
- Preceded by: Coleman Young II
- Succeeded by: John Conyers III (elect)
- Constituency: 3rd district (2023–present); 1st district (2019–2023)

Member of the Michigan House of Representatives from the 6th district
- In office January 1, 2015 – January 1, 2019
- Preceded by: Rashida Tlaib
- Succeeded by: Tyrone Carter

Personal details
- Born: Stephanie Lily Chang; October 24, 1983 (age 43) Detroit, Michigan, U.S.
- Party: Democratic
- Spouse: Sean Gray
- Education: University of Michigan (BA, MSW, MPP)
- Website: Official website

Stephanie Lily Chang (born October 24, 1983) is an American politician and a Democratic member of the Michigan Senate since 2023. She has represented the 3rd district since 2023, having formerly represented 1st district. Prior to this, she was a member of the Michigan House of Representatives for the 6th district from 2015 to 2023.

Chang is the first Asian American woman to serve in the Michigan Legislature. She was also the first woman to give birth while serving as a Michigan state senator.

== Early life and education ==
Stephanie Lily Chang was born at Sinai-Grace Hospital in Detroit. She was raised with her older sister, Josephina, in Canton, Michigan, and is the daughter of Taiwanese American parents who emigrated from Taiwan to pursue work in the auto industry.

In 2005, Chang graduated from the University of Michigan with a bachelor's in psychology and a minor in Asian/Pacific Islander American Studies. In May 2014, she received a master's in public policy and a master's in social work at the University of Michigan.

While at the Gerald R. Ford School of Public Policy at the University of Michigan, Chang was a David Bohnett Leadership Fellow, interning at the Detroit mayor's office, as a paid intern via the David Bohnett Foundation.

== Career ==
=== Community activism ===
Before her election, Chang worked for about a decade as a community organizer in Detroit. During that time, she worked for NextGen Climate Michigan as the state director, Center for Progressive Leadership in Michigan as the alumni engagement and evaluation coordinator, the James and Grace Lee Boggs School as the community engagement coordinator, the Campaign for Justice as deputy director, Michigan United as an organizer, and as an assistant to Grace Lee Boggs.

Chang was the co-founder and past president of Asian and Pacific Islander American Vote-Michigan and previously a mentor with the Detroit Asian Youth Project. She also co-founded and is a board member for Rising Voices of Asian American Families. She is a board member of the Southwest Detroit Community Justice Center.

=== Michigan Legislature ===
==== Michigan House of Representatives (2015-2019) ====
In 2014, Chang was elected to succeed Rashida Tlaib as a member of the Michigan House of Representatives for the 6th District, and took office in January 2015. In her first term, she served on the Committees on Criminal Justice, Education, and Judiciary. In her second term, she served on the Committees on Education Reform, Law and Justice (where she serves as Minority Vice Chair), and Natural Resources.

Much of her legislative work focused on air quality, affordable and safe drinking water, education and criminal justice reforms.

She was the chair of the Progressive Women's Caucus, a founding member of the Asian Pacific American Legislative Caucus, and a member of the Detroit Caucus, Michigan Democratic Latino Legislative Caucus and Michigan Legislative Black Caucus. She also served on the federal Environmental Protection Agency's Local Government Advisory Committee, which provides advice and recommendations to the EPA administrator to help develop strong partnerships with local governments to deliver environmental services and programs. Chang also focuses much of her work with residents in the district with the Mary Turner Center for Advocacy, the Neighborhood Service Center, ranging from saving homes from tax foreclosure to hosting a community baby shower for low-income pregnant women. In 2016 she launched the Girls Making Change fellowship, a leadership program for high school girls of color in District 6.

==== Michigan Senate (2019-present) ====
In 2018, Chang ran to represent the 1st district in the Michigan Senate, where she faced fellow Michigan state representative Bettie Cook Scott in a Democratic Party. She defeated Scott in the August 7, 2018 primary by a 49% to 11% margin. During the election, Cook Scott made racially charged comments about Chang, referring to her as "ching-chang" and "the ching-chong", but later issued an apology through a representative.

Following redistricting, she successfully ran to represent the 3rd district in the 2022 election. She would become the minority floor leader in the State Senate. She is the minority vice chair for the Committee on Judiciary and Public Safety and for the Committee on Finance.

She has passed legislation related to female genital mutilation, criminal justice reform, nitrous oxide "Whippets," business improvement zones, domestic violence, and reentry services for previously incarcerated but exonerated people.

== Personal life ==
Chang and her husband, Sean Gray, live in Detroit with their two young daughters.
