= Magna Vista, Mississippi =

Unincorporated community in Mississippi, United States

- Ghost town
- Location within Mississippi Location within the United States
- Coordinates: 32°39′29″N 91°03′42″W
- Country: United States
- State: Mississippi
- County: Issaquena
- Elevation 32: 105 ft (32 m)
- Time zone: UTC-6 (Central (CST))
  - Summer (DST): UTC-5 (CDT)
- GNIS feature ID: 692034

Magna Vista is a ghost town in Issaquena County, Mississippi.

Magna Vista originated as a postal village located directly on the Mississippi River. It had a population of 50 in 1900. A post office operated under the name Magna Vista from 1887 to 1932.

In 1934, the U.S. Army Corps of Engineers began construction of the Newman Cutoff, which created Chotard Lake and Albemarle Lake, both oxbow lakes, and removed Magna Vista from the contiguous Mississippi River.

The place where Magna Vista was located is now directly on top of the Mississippi Levee. Nothing remains of the former settlement.
