= Michigan's 3rd Senate district =

American legislative district

Michigan's 3rd State Senate district
Senator
Stephanie Chang; D–Detroit
- Demographics: 40.3% White; 41.2% Black; 2.3% Hispanic; 10.6% Asian; 0.2% Native American; 1% Other; 4.4% Multiracial
- Population (2024): 263,633

Michigan's 3rd Senate district is one of 38 districts in the Michigan Senate. It has been represented by Democrat Stephanie Chang since 2023, succeeding fellow Democrat Sylvia Santana.

It is the most Democratic-leaning district in the Senate, giving both Hillary Clinton and Barack Obama over 80% of the vote.

== Geography ==
District 3 encompasses parts of Macomb, Oakland, and Wayne counties.

=== 2011 Apportionment Plan ===
District 3, as dictated by the 2011 Apportionment Plan, was based in the city of Dearborn and parts of western Detroit in Wayne County, also covering the smaller community of Melvindale.

The district overlapped with Michigan's 12th, 13th, and 14th congressional districts, and with the 5th, 7th, 8th, 9th, 10th, 14th, and 15th districts of the Michigan House of Representatives.

== List of senators ==
Senator	Party	Dates	Residence	Notes
Calvin Britain	Democratic	1835–1837	St. Joseph	
John S. Barry	Democratic	1835–1838	Constantine	
Horace H. Comstock	Democratic	1835–1838	Comstock	
Vincent L. Bradford	Democratic	1838	Niles	
Elijah F. Cook	Democratic	1839	Farmington	
Thomas J. Drake	Whig	1839–1841	Flint	
Stephen V. R. Trowbridge	Whig	1839–1841	Birmingham	
John P. LeRoy	Whig	1840–1841	Pontiac	
Elisha P. Champlin	Whig	1842	Jonesville	
John Burch	Democratic	1842–1843	Monroe	
William L. Greenly	Democratic	1842–1843	Adrian	
Michael A. Patterson	Democratic	1844–1845	Tecumseh	
William T. Howell	Democratic	1843–1846	Hillsdale	
Jefferson G. Thurber	Democratic	1844–1847	Monroe	
Rufus Kibbee	Democratic	1846–1847	Medina	
George Coe	Whig	1847	Coldwater	
John P. Cook	Democratic	1847–1848	Hillsdale	
Daniel D. Sinclair	Democratic	1848	Adrian	
Enos G. Berry	Democratic	1848–1849	Quincy	
Nelson Dunham	Democratic	1848–1849	Dundee	
Levi Baxter	Whig	1849–1850	Jonesville	Also backed by the Free Soilers.
Fielder S. Snow	Democratic	1849–1850	Clinton	
Isaac P. Christiancy	Democratic	1850	Monroe	
Isaac P. Christiancy	Free Soil	1851–1852	Monroe	
Alfred French	Democratic	1850–1852	Bronson	Resigned.
John Barber	Democratic	1851–1852	Adrian	
Henry S. Mead	Democratic	1851–1852	Hillsdale	
The 1850 Michigan Constitution takes effect, changing the district from a multi-member district to a single-member district.
Henry Fralick	Democratic	1853–1854	Plymouth	
Nathaniel Ladd	Republican	1855–1856	Dearbornville	
Henry Ledyard	Democratic	1857–1858	Detroit	
Thornton F. Brodhead	Democratic	1859–1860	Trenton	
Henry T. Backus	Republican	1861–1862	Detroit	
William E. Warner	Democratic	1863–1864	Rawsonville	
Adam Minnis	Democratic	1865–1866	Wayne	
Oliver C. Abell	Republican	1867–1868	Wayne	
Elliott T. Slocum	Republican	1869–1870	Trenton	
Robert V. Briggs	Democratic	1871–1872	Wyandotte	
William C. Sutton	Republican	1873–1874	Ecorse	
James I. David	Democratic	1875–1876	Ecorse	
Matthew Markey	Democratic	1877–1878	Wayne	
William W. Duffield	Democratic	1879–1880	Inkster	
Thomas Morrison	Republican	1881–1882	Wayne	
James M. Hueston	Democratic	1883–1886	Northville	
Bernard O'Reilly	Democratic	1887–1888	Detroit	Also backed by the Independent Labor Party.
Anthony Grosfield	Democratic	1889–1890	Detroit	
Peter E. Park	Democratic	1891–1892	Detroit	
Joseph R. McLaughlin	Republican	1893–1896	Detroit	
Charles W. Moore	Republican	1897–1898	Detroit	
George F. Monaghan	Democratic	1899–1900	Detroit	
James E. Scripps	Republican	1903–1904	Detroit	
Noble Ashley	Republican	1905–1906	Detroit	
Joseph Edward Bland	Republican	1907–1908	Detroit	
John Donald M. MacKay	Republican	1909–1910	Detroit	
Guy A. Miller	Republican	1911–1912	Detroit	
James W. Hanley	Republican	1913–1918	Detroit	
Arthur E. Wood	Republican	1919–1926	Detroit	
Joseph Bahorski	Republican	1927–1928	Detroit	
George Kolowich	Republican	1929–1930	Hamtramck	
Charles A. Roxborough	Republican	1931–1932	Detroit	
Leo G. Karwick	Democratic	1933–1934	Hamtramck	
John Mankowski	Democratic	1935–1936	Hamtramck	
Charles C. Diggs Sr.	Democratic	1937–1944	Detroit	
Henry R. Kozak	Democratic	1945–1950	Hamtramck	
Charles C. Diggs Jr.	Democratic	1951–1954	Detroit	
Cora Brown	Democratic	1955–1956	Detroit	
Basil W. Brown	Democratic	1957–1964	Detroit	
Stanley F. Rozycki	Democratic	1965–1974	Detroit	
Basil W. Brown	Democratic	1975–1982	Detroit	
Jackie Vaughn III	Democratic	1983–1994	Detroit	
Henry Stallings II	Democratic	1995–1998	Detroit	Resigned.
Raymond M. Murphy	Democratic	1998–2002	Detroit	
Irma Clark-Coleman	Democratic	2003–2010	Detroit	
Morris Hood III	Democratic	2011–2018	Detroit	
Sylvia Santana	Democratic	2019–2022	Detroit	
Stephanie Chang	Democratic	2023–present	Detroit	
John Conyers III	Democratic	(Note: Member-elect.)		

== Recent election results ==
=== 2020s ===
2026 Michigan Senate election
Primary election
Party	Candidate	Votes	%
Democratic	John Conyers III	9,426	24.4
Democratic	Adam Hollier	7,488	19.39
Democratic	Eboni Taylor	7,248	18.76
Democratic	Korey Hall	4,225	10.94
Democratic	LaTanya Garrett	2,829	7.32
Democratic	Mohammad Alam	2,179	5.64
Democratic	Toinu Reeves	1,998	5.17
Democratic	Kimberly Hill Knott	1,734	4.49
Democratic	Abraham Shaw	517	1.34
Democratic	Gary Hunter	494	1.28
Democratic	LeJuan Council	489	1.27
Total votes		38,627	100
Republican	Mark Ashley Price	989	100
Total votes		989	100
General election
Democratic	John Conyers III	76,949	93.1
Republican	Mark Ashley Price	3,456	4.18
Working Class	David Roehrig	2,249	2.72
Total votes		82,654	100
Democratic hold			

2022 Michigan Senate election, District 3
Primary election
Party	Candidate	Votes	%
Democratic	Stephanie Chang	22,452	82.8
Democratic	Toinu Reeves	4,659	17.2
Total votes		27,111	100
General election
Democratic	Stephanie Chang	61,247	85.7
Working Class	Linda Rayburn	10,243	14.3
Total votes		71,490	100
Democratic hold			

=== 2018 ===
2018 Michigan Senate election, District 3
Primary election
Party	Candidate	Votes	%
Democratic	Sylvia Santana	12,646	41.5
Democratic	Gary Woronchak	11,785	38.7
Democratic	Anita Belle	4,367	14.3
Democratic	Terry Burrell	1,668	5.5
Total votes		30,466	100
General election
Democratic	Sylvia Santana	58,405	81.8
Republican	Kathy Stecker	10,928	15.3
Working Class	Hali McEachern	2,095	2.9
Total votes		71,428	100
Democratic hold			

=== 2014 ===
2014 Michigan Senate election, District 3
Party	Candidate	Votes	%
Democratic	Morris Hood III (incumbent)	45,546	80.4
Republican	Matthew Keller	11,086	19.6
Total votes		56,632	100
Democratic hold			

=== Federal and statewide results ===
Year	Office	Results
2020	President	Biden 81.6 – 17.2%
2018	Senate	Stabenow 81.7 – 16.3%
2018	Governor	Whitmer 82.4 – 15.3%
2016	President	Clinton 80.7 – 16.1%
2014	Senate	Peters 81.6 – 15.6%
2014	Governor	Schauer 74.9 – 23.5%
2012	President	Obama 85.0 – 14.4%
2012	Senate	Stabenow 85.7 – 11.9%

== Historical district boundaries ==
Map	Description	Apportionment Plan	Notes
	Wayne County (part); Detroit (part); Hamtramck	1964 Apportionment Plan	
	Wayne County (part); Detroit (part); Highland Park	1972 Apportionment Plan	
	Wayne County (part); Detroit (part)	1982 Apportionment Plan	
	Wayne County (part); Detroit (part); River Rouge	1992 Apportionment Plan	
	Wayne County (part); Dearborn; Detroit (part); River Rouge	2001 Apportionment Plan	
	Wayne County (part); Dearborn; Detroit (part); Melvindale	2011 Apportionment Plan	
