= 1936 United States presidential election in Mississippi =

- November 3, 1936

All 9 Mississippi votes to the Electoral College

Nominee	Franklin D. Roosevelt	Alf Landon
Party	Democratic	Republican
Home state	New York	Kansas
Running mate	John Nance Garner	Frank Knox
Electoral vote	9	0
Popular vote	157,333	4,467
Percentage	97.03%	2.75%
County results
Roosevelt
80–90%
90–100%
President before election
Franklin D. Roosevelt
Democratic
Elected President
Franklin D. Roosevelt
Democratic

The 1936 United States presidential election in Mississippi took place on November 3, 1936, as part of the 1936 United States presidential election. Mississippi voters chose nine representatives, or electors, to the Electoral College, who voted for president and vice president.

Mississippi was won by incumbent President Franklin D. Roosevelt (D–New York), running with Vice President John Nance Garner, with 97.03% of the popular vote, against Governor Alf Landon (R–Kansas), running with Frank Knox, with 2.75% of the popular vote.

By percentage of the popular vote won, Mississippi was Roosevelt's second-best state. The only state in which he won more of the popular vote than in Mississippi was in South Carolina, where he won 98.57%.

The Roosevelt/Garner ticket easily carried Mississippi on election day, carrying every single county with greater than 85% of the vote, all but two with greater than 90%, and one (Issaquena) unanimously.

== Results ==
1936 United States presidential election in Mississippi
Party	Candidate	Votes	%
Democratic	Franklin D. Roosevelt (inc.)	157,333	97.03%
Republican	Alf Landon	4,467	2.75%
Socialist	Norman Thomas	342	0.21%
Total votes		162,142	100%

=== Results by county ===
1936 United States presidential election in Mississippi
County	Franklin Delano Roosevelt Democratic		Alfred Mossman Landon Republican		Norman Mattoon Thomas Socialist		Margin		Total votes cast
County	#	%	#	%	#	%	#	%	Total votes cast
Adams	1,732	93.12%	124	6.67%	4	0.22%	1,608	86.45%	1,860
Alcorn	2,396	97.52%	53	2.16%	8	0.33%	2,343	95.36%	2,457
Amite	1,421	95.24%	56	3.75%	15	1.01%	1,365	91.49%	1,492
Attala	1,855	97.79%	36	1.90%	6	0.32%	1,819	95.89%	1,897
Benton	1,717	99.42%	10	0.58%	0	0.00%	1,707	98.84%	1,727
Bolivar	2,296	95.79%	101	4.21%	0	0.00%	2,195	91.57%	2,397
Calhoun	1,691	97.58%	40	2.31%	2	0.12%	1,651	95.27%	1,733
Carroll	1,030	98.10%	19	1.81%	1	0.10%	1,011	96.29%	1,050
Chickasaw	1,559	98.80%	18	1.14%	1	0.06%	1,541	97.66%	1,578
Choctaw	1,342	96.83%	41	2.96%	3	0.22%	1,301	93.87%	1,386
Claiborne	774	96.03%	31	3.85%	1	0.12%	743	92.18%	806
Clarke	2,089	98.40%	31	1.46%	3	0.14%	2,058	96.94%	2,123
Clay	1,271	97.54%	32	2.46%	0	0.00%	1,239	95.09%	1,303
Coahoma	2,059	97.68%	49	2.32%	0	0.00%	2,010	95.35%	2,108
Copiah	2,397	98.12%	45	1.84%	1	0.04%	2,352	96.28%	2,443
Covington	1,589	96.65%	52	3.16%	3	0.18%	1,537	93.49%	1,644
DeSoto	1,343	99.04%	13	0.96%	0	0.00%	1,330	98.08%	1,356
Forrest	3,596	93.62%	234	6.09%	11	0.29%	3,362	87.53%	3,841
Franklin	1,098	96.83%	33	2.91%	3	0.26%	1,065	93.92%	1,134
George	892	97.17%	24	2.61%	2	0.22%	868	94.55%	918
Greene	830	94.43%	46	5.23%	3	0.34%	784	89.19%	879
Grenada	1,245	98.97%	13	1.03%	0	0.00%	1,232	97.93%	1,258
Hancock	1,284	87.70%	164	11.20%	14	0.96%	1,120	76.50%	1,464
Harrison	4,208	88.78%	495	10.44%	37	0.78%	3,713	78.33%	4,740
Hinds	8,647	96.33%	313	3.49%	16	0.18%	8,334	92.85%	8,976
Holmes	1,885	99.37%	12	0.63%	0	0.00%	1,873	98.73%	1,897
Humphreys	1,164	99.40%	7	0.60%	0	0.00%	1,157	98.80%	1,171
Issaquena	214	100.00%	0	0.00%	0	0.00%	214	100.00%	214
Itawamba	1,465	96.89%	47	3.11%	0	0.00%	1,418	93.78%	1,512
Jackson	1,704	93.06%	120	6.55%	7	0.38%	1,584	86.51%	1,831
Jasper	2,004	98.87%	21	1.04%	2	0.10%	1,983	97.83%	2,027
Jefferson	884	98.88%	9	1.01%	1	0.11%	875	97.87%	894
Jefferson Davis	1,325	95.05%	67	4.81%	1	0.07%	1,258	90.24%	1,394
Jones	4,461	95.02%	185	3.94%	49	1.04%	4,276	91.08%	4,695
Kemper	1,477	99.46%	8	0.54%	0	0.00%	1,469	98.92%	1,485
Lafayette	1,652	98.16%	26	1.54%	5	0.30%	1,626	96.61%	1,683
Lamar	1,210	92.65%	91	6.97%	5	0.38%	1,119	85.68%	1,306
Lauderdale	6,075	98.72%	67	1.09%	12	0.19%	6,008	97.63%	6,154
Lawrence	1,286	97.35%	34	2.57%	1	0.08%	1,252	94.78%	1,321
Leake	2,566	99.30%	8	0.31%	7	0.27%	2,558	98.99%	2,584
Lee	3,585	98.84%	42	1.16%	0	0.00%	3,543	97.68%	3,627
Leflore	2,137	98.34%	35	1.61%	1	0.05%	2,102	96.73%	2,173
Lincoln	2,465	96.70%	74	2.90%	10	0.39%	2,391	93.80%	2,549
Lowndes	2,328	97.24%	56	2.34%	10	0.42%	2,272	94.90%	2,394
Madison	1,838	98.24%	32	1.71%	1	0.05%	1,806	96.53%	1,871
Marion	1,932	98.07%	37	1.88%	1	0.05%	1,895	96.19%	1,970
Marshall	1,111	97.97%	22	1.94%	1	0.09%	1,089	96.03%	1,134
Monroe	3,199	98.22%	55	1.69%	3	0.09%	3,144	96.53%	3,257
Montgomery	1,383	99.64%	5	0.36%	0	0.00%	1,378	99.28%	1,388
Neshoba	3,495	98.04%	67	1.88%	3	0.08%	3,428	96.16%	3,565
Newton	2,624	98.42%	39	1.46%	3	0.11%	2,585	96.96%	2,666
Noxubee	1,332	97.94%	27	1.99%	1	0.07%	1,305	95.96%	1,360
Oktibbeha	1,714	98.73%	19	1.09%	3	0.17%	1,695	97.64%	1,736
Panola	1,481	99.80%	3	0.20%	0	0.00%	1,478	99.60%	1,484
Pearl River	1,156	93.23%	81	6.53%	3	0.24%	1,075	86.69%	1,240
Perry	737	97.88%	16	2.12%	0	0.00%	721	95.75%	753
Pike	3,170	97.21%	86	2.64%	5	0.15%	3,084	94.57%	3,261
Pontotoc	2,286	95.73%	93	3.89%	9	0.38%	2,193	91.83%	2,388
Prentiss	1,809	97.10%	50	2.68%	4	0.21%	1,759	94.42%	1,863
Quitman	1,025	99.03%	9	0.87%	1	0.10%	1,016	98.16%	1,035
Rankin	1,884	97.06%	54	2.78%	3	0.15%	1,830	94.28%	1,941
Scott	2,097	98.40%	33	1.55%	1	0.05%	2,064	96.86%	2,131
Sharkey	567	98.78%	7	1.22%	0	0.00%	560	97.56%	574
Simpson	2,445	98.04%	48	1.92%	1	0.04%	2,397	96.11%	2,494
Smith	1,676	98.94%	17	1.00%	1	0.06%	1,659	97.93%	1,694
Stone	675	96.43%	23	3.29%	2	0.29%	652	93.14%	700
Sunflower	2,508	99.17%	21	0.83%	0	0.00%	2,487	98.34%	2,529
Tallahatchie	1,567	99.68%	4	0.25%	1	0.06%	1,563	99.43%	1,572
Tate	1,088	99.36%	7	0.64%	0	0.00%	1,081	98.72%	1,095
Tippah	1,625	98.84%	19	1.16%	0	0.00%	1,606	97.69%	1,644
Tishomingo	1,619	92.83%	115	6.59%	10	0.57%	1,504	86.24%	1,744
Tunica	701	99.29%	5	0.71%	0	0.00%	696	98.58%	706
Union	2,249	97.11%	63	2.72%	4	0.17%	2,186	94.39%	2,316
Walthall	1,234	97.70%	28	2.22%	1	0.08%	1,206	95.49%	1,263
Warren	3,233	96.19%	122	3.63%	6	0.18%	3,111	92.56%	3,361
Washington	2,143	95.63%	94	4.19%	4	0.18%	2,049	91.43%	2,241
Wayne	1,367	96.81%	44	3.12%	1	0.07%	1,323	93.70%	1,412
Webster	1,439	95.49%	56	3.72%	12	0.80%	1,383	91.77%	1,507
Wilkinson	767	97.09%	21	2.66%	2	0.25%	746	94.43%	790
Winston	2,418	99.34%	15	0.62%	1	0.04%	2,403	98.73%	2,434
Yalobusha	1,350	98.04%	25	1.82%	2	0.15%	1,325	96.22%	1,377
Yazoo	2,141	99.07%	17	0.79%	3	0.14%	2,124	98.29%	2,161
Total	157,333	97.03%	4,467	2.75%	342	0.21%	152,866	94.48%	162,142
