= Issaquena County, Mississippi =

County in Mississippi, United States

- County
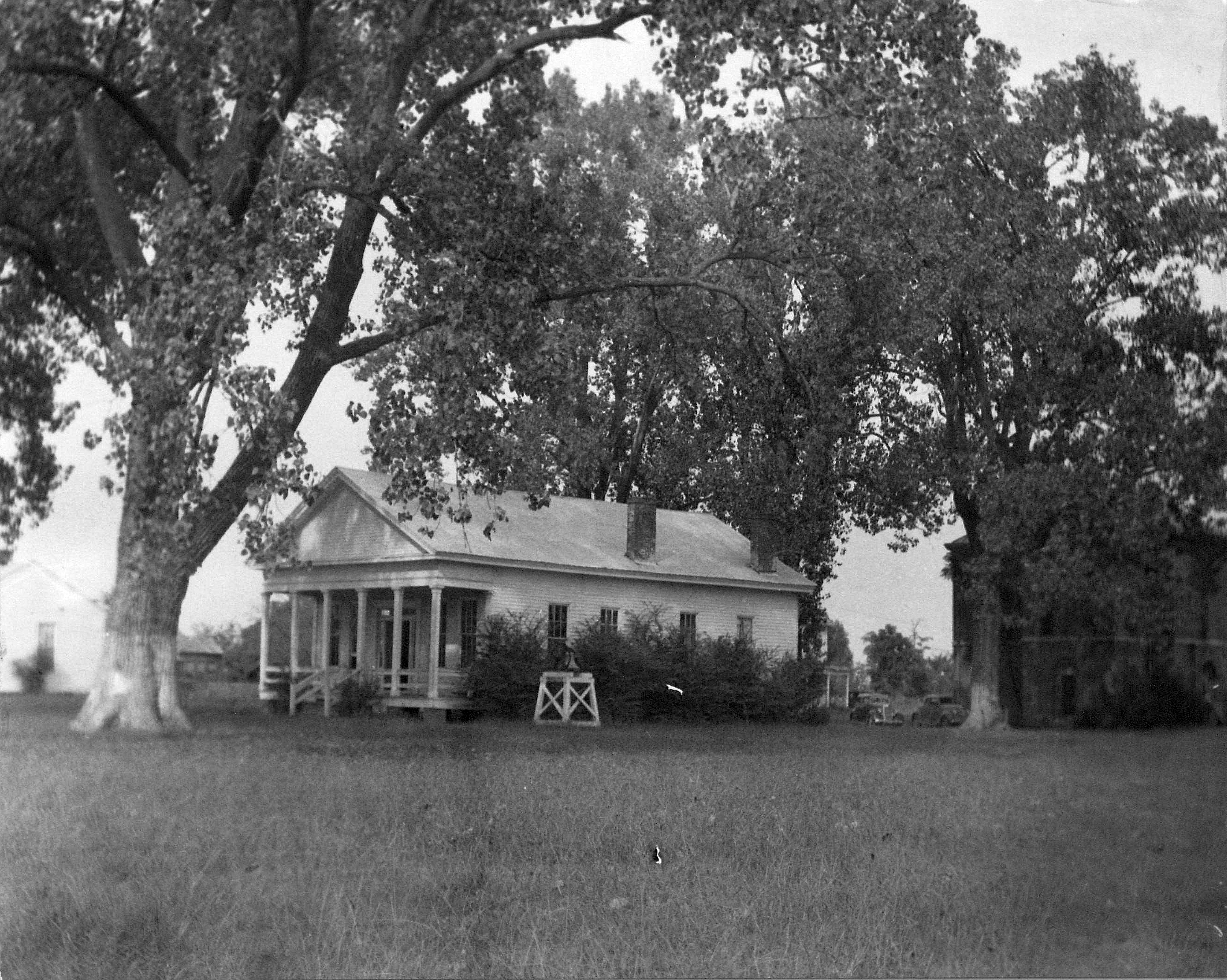
- Historic photo of the Issaquena County Courthouse in Mayersville, Mississippi

- Location within the U.S. state of Mississippi
- Coordinates: 32°44′N 90°59′W
- Country: United States
- State: Mississippi
- Founded: January 23, 1844
- Seat: Mayersville
- Largest town: Mayersville

Area
  - Total: 441 sq mi (1,140 km^{2})
  - Land: 413 sq mi (1,070 km^{2})
  - Water: 28 sq mi (73 km^{2}) 6.4%

Population (2020)
  - Total: 1,338
  - Estimate (2025): 1,263 ▼
  - Density: 3.24/sq mi (1.25/km^{2})
- Time zone: UTC−6 (Central)
  - Summer (DST): UTC−5 (CDT)
- Congressional district: 2nd

Issaquena County (/ˌɪsəˈkwiːnə/, ISS-ə-KWEEN-ə) is a county located in the U.S. state of Mississippi. As of the 2020 Census, its population was 1,338, making it the least populous county in the United States east of the Mississippi River. Its county seat is Mayersville. With a per-capita income of $24,489, Issaquena County is, by that measure, the third-poorest county in the United States.

Issaquena County is located in the Mississippi Delta region. The Mississippi River flows along the entire western boundary of the county, and many of the earliest communities were river ports.

The county's economy is chiefly based on agriculture and a prison, the Issaquena County Correctional Facility. Hunting also contributes to the economy; Mississippi's two most recent records for the heaviest alligator taken by a hunter have both been in Issaquena County, the latest in 2012 when a 697.5 lb (316.4 kg) alligator was killed at a camp near Fitler.

== History ==
"Issaquena" (isi okhina) is a Choctaw word meaning "Deer River"; it is the Indian name for Deer Creek. The Choctaw people were the first inhabitants of the county, and were removed from their land in 1820. Non-Native settlers began arriving in the early 1830s.

Issaquena County was established on January 23, 1844, from the southern portion of Washington County. The first county seat was located in Skipwith, and then moved to Duncansby (both communities are now ghost towns). In 1848, the county seat moved to Tallula, and in 1871, to Mayersville. A state law was enacted in 1850 to allow Issaquena County to tax landowners near the river for levee construction.

The county lies entirely in the Mississippi Alluvial Plain, and hardwood forest known as "bottomland" grows thick in the nutrient-rich, high-clay "buckshot" soil. Early settlers cleared many forests, and by the early 1890s about 50,000 acres (20,000 ha) of the county was growing corn, cotton, and oats. About that same time, the Louisville, New Orleans and Texas Railway was completed along a north–south route through the center of the county.

In 1876, Sharkey County was created from portions of Issaquena, Warren, and Washington counties.

=== Slavery ===
In 1860, 92.5% of Issaquena County's total population were enslaved people, the highest concentration anywhere in the United States. The U.S. Census for that year showed that 7,244 slaves were held in Issaquena County, and of 115 slave owners, 39 held 77 or more slaves. Stephen Duncan of Issaquena County held 858 slaves, second only to Joshua John Ward of South Carolina. This large "value of slave property" made Issaquena County the second richest county in the United States, with "mean total wealth per freeman" at $26,800 in 1860 (equivalent to $782,000 in 2025). By 1880—just 15 years after the abolition of slavery—the county had developed "a strong year-round market for wage labor", and Issaquena was the only county in Mississippi to report "no sharecropping or sharerenting whatsoever".

=== Civil War ===
During the winter of 1862 and spring of 1863, Union Army General Ulysses S. Grant conducted a series of amphibious operations aimed at capturing the Confederate stronghold of Vicksburg, located south of Issaquena County.

The Steele's Bayou Expedition occurred on waterways within Issaquena County, including Steele Bayou, Little Sunflower River, Big Sunflower River, Deer Creek, Black Bayou, Little Black Bayou, and the Yazoo River.

The shallow waterways proved difficult for the large Union boats, and Confederate defenses were robust. The Steele's Bayou Expedition was a defeat for Union forces in Issaquena County.

=== Weather events ===
In 1971, a large and long-tracked tornado destroyed multiple towns in Issaquena County.

== Geography ==
According to the United States Census Bureau, the county has a total area of 441 square miles (1,140 km^{2}), of which 413 square miles (1,070 km^{2}) is land and 28 square miles (73 km^{2}) (6.4%) is water.

=== Major highways ===
- U.S. Route 61
- Mississippi Highway 1
- Mississippi Highway 14
- Mississippi Highway 16

=== Adjacent counties ===
- Washington County (north)
- Sharkey County (northeast)
- Yazoo County (east)
- Warren County (south)
- East Carroll Parish, Louisiana (west)
- Chicot County, Arkansas (northwest)

== Demographics ==
Historical population
Census	Pop.	Note	%±
1850	4,478		—
1860	7,831		74.9%
1870	6,887		−12.1%
1880	10,004		45.3%
1890	12,318		23.1%
1900	10,400		−15.6%
1910	10,560		1.5%
1920	7,618		−27.9%
1930	5,734		−24.7%
1940	6,433		12.2%
1950	4,966		−22.8%
1960	3,576		−28.0%
1970	2,737		−23.5%
1980	2,513		−8.2%
1990	1,909		−24.0%
2000	2,274		19.1%
2010	1,406		−38.2%
2020	1,338		−4.8%
2025 (est.)	1,263	▼	−5.6%
U.S. Decennial Census; 1790-1960 1900-1990; 1990-2000 2010-2020

=== Racial and ethnic composition ===
Issaquena County, Mississippi – Racial and ethnic composition Note: the US Census treats Hispanic/Latino as an ethnic category. This table excludes Latinos from the racial categories and assigns them to a separate category. Hispanics/Latinos may be of any race.
Race / Ethnicity (NH = Non-Hispanic)	Pop 1980	Pop 1990	Pop 2000	Pop 2010	Pop 2020	% 1980	% 1990	% 2000	% 2010	% 2020
White alone (NH)	1,101	833	822	482	440	43.81%	43.64%	36.15%	34.28%	32.88%
Black or African American alone (NH)	1,374	1,066	1,426	905	748	54.68%	55.84%	62.71%	64.37%	55.90%
Native American or Alaska Native alone (NH)	0	1	2	3	1	0.00%	0.05%	0.09%	0.21%	0.07%
Asian alone (NH)	3	3	0	6	5	0.12%	0.16%	0.00%	0.43%	0.37%
Native Hawaiian or Pacific Islander alone (NH)	x	x	0	0	0	x	x	0.00%	0.00%	0.00%
Other race alone (NH)	0	0	0	0	1	0.00%	0.00%	0.00%	0.00%	0.07%
Mixed race or Multiracial (NH)	x	x	14	2	15	x	x	0.62%	0.14%	1.12%
Hispanic or Latino (any race)	35	6	10	8	128	1.39%	0.31%	0.44%	0.57%	9.57%
Total	2,513	1,909	2,274	1,406	1,338	100.00%	100.00%	100.00%	100.00%	100.00%

=== 2020 census ===
As of the 2020 census, the county had a population of 1,338. The median age was 37.9 years. 13.5% of residents were under the age of 18 and 14.0% of residents were 65 years of age or older. For every 100 females there were 211.2 males, and for every 100 females age 18 and over there were 241.3 males age 18 and over.

The racial makeup of the county was 39.6% White, 56.6% Black or African American, 0.2% American Indian and Alaska Native, 0.4% Asian, <0.1% Native Hawaiian and Pacific Islander, 0.9% from some other race, and 2.3% from two or more races. Hispanic or Latino residents of any race comprised 9.6% of the population.

<0.1% of residents lived in urban areas, while 100.0% lived in rural areas.

There were 368 households in the county, of which 31.5% had children under the age of 18 living in them. Of all households, 39.7% were married-couple households, 22.3% were households with a male householder and no spouse or partner present, and 31.0% were households with a female householder and no spouse or partner present. About 26.6% of all households were made up of individuals and 10.9% had someone living alone who was 65 years of age or older.

There were 439 housing units, of which 16.2% were vacant. Among occupied housing units, 69.6% were owner-occupied and 30.4% were renter-occupied. The homeowner vacancy rate was <0.1% and the rental vacancy rate was 14.4%.

=== 2010 census ===
As of the census of 2010, there were 1,406 people living in the county. 64.4% were Black or African American, 34.6% White, 0.4% Asian, 0.2% Native American, 0.1% of some other race and 0.2% of two or more races. 0.6% were Hispanic or Latino (of any race).

=== 2000 census ===
As of the census of 2000, there were 2,274 people, 726 households, and 509 families living in the county. The population density was 5.15 people per square mile (1.99 people/km^{2}). There were 877 housing units at an average density of 2 units per square mile (0.77 units/km^{2}). The racial makeup of the county was 36.32% White, 62.75% Black or African American, 0.09% Native American, 0.22% from other races, and 0.62% from two or more races. 0.44% of the population were Hispanic or Latino of any race.

There were 726 households, out of which 34.20% had children under the age of 18 living with them, 45.60% were married couples living together, 16.00% had a female householder with no husband present, and 29.80% were non-families. 26.20% of all households were made up of individuals, and 12.30% had someone living alone who was 65 years of age or older. The average household size was 2.77 and the average family size was 3.37.

In the county, the population was spread out, with 27.70% under the age of 18, 10.90% from 18 to 24, 30.90% from 25 to 44, 19.90% from 45 to 64, and 10.70% who were 65 years of age or older. The median age was 33 years. For every 100 females there were 113.50 males. For every 100 females age 18 and over, there were 130.10 males.

The median income for a household in the county was $19,936, and the median income for a family was $23,913. Males had a median income of $23,167 versus $17,115 for females. The per capita income for the county was $10,581. About 25.90% of families and 33.20% of the population were below the poverty line, including 43.20% of those under age 18 and 41.00% of those age 65 or over.

Issaquena County has the second lowest per capita income in Mississippi and the 36th lowest in the United States.

=== Poverty and unemployment ===
Of 3,197 counties ranked by the U.S. Census Bureau in 2011 for "estimated percent of people of all ages in poverty", Issaquena was 14th; for those under age 18, the county was eighth. It was estimated that 40.1 percent of the county's residents lived in poverty.

In 2014, Issaquena County had the highest percentage of unemployed people in Mississippi, and the fifth highest of any county in the United States, at 18.4 percent.

== Government and politics ==
The county has been depopulating, similar to some other rural Black Belt counties.

The county is considered to lean Democratic, voting for Barack Obama in both 2008 and 2012. However, the county voted for Republican senator Thad Cochran's reelection bid in 2014. Donald Trump came within 50 votes of winning the county in 2020 and won it by only 9 votes in 2024.

In the 2023 statewide elections, Issaquena voted Republican for two races. In 2024, the county voted Republican in both of the statewide races, with Donald Trump flipping the county Republican for the first time since 1984 on a presidential level.

United States presidential election results for Issaquena County, Mississippi
Year	Republican		Democratic		Third party(ies)	
Year	No.	%	No.	%	No.	%
1912	3	2.70%	99	89.19%	9	8.11%
1916	8	7.62%	94	89.52%	3	2.86%
1920	13	13.54%	83	86.46%	0	0.00%
1924	17	11.89%	126	88.11%	0	0.00%
1928	6	4.29%	134	95.71%	0	0.00%
1932	1	0.63%	159	99.38%	0	0.00%
1936	0	0.00%	214	100.00%	0	0.00%
1940	9	3.96%	218	96.04%	0	0.00%
1944	5	2.27%	215	97.73%	0	0.00%
1948	5	2.22%	11	4.89%	209	92.89%
1952	127	42.76%	170	57.24%	0	0.00%
1956	42	14.53%	172	59.52%	75	25.95%
1960	64	15.13%	178	42.08%	181	42.79%
1964	456	93.06%	34	6.94%	0	0.00%
1968	44	3.98%	527	47.69%	534	48.33%
1972	701	60.80%	395	34.26%	57	4.94%
1976	325	34.07%	567	59.43%	62	6.50%
1980	349	36.05%	598	61.78%	21	2.17%
1984	512	49.52%	501	48.45%	21	2.03%
1988	424	43.58%	511	52.52%	38	3.91%
1992	298	30.10%	550	55.56%	142	14.34%
1996	269	30.81%	546	62.54%	58	6.64%
2000	366	38.89%	555	58.98%	20	2.13%
2004	439	45.26%	516	53.20%	15	1.55%
2008	364	38.32%	579	60.95%	7	0.74%
2012	302	38.37%	479	60.86%	6	0.76%
2016	298	42.63%	395	56.51%	6	0.86%
2020	308	45.56%	355	52.51%	13	1.92%
2024	296	47.59%	287	46.14%	39	6.27%

== Education ==
There are no K-12 schools located in Issaquena County. Students attend campuses in neighboring Sharkey and Washington counties.

- Public School Districts
  - South Delta School District – Based in Rolling Fork; Serves most of Issaquena County including Mayersville. Operates South Delta High School.
  - Western Line School District – Based in Avon; Serves northwestern portion of Issaquena County.
- Private Schools
  - Sharkey-Issaquena Academy – Located in Rolling Fork; Enrollment open to Issaquena County residents.

There is a Head Start facility that began in 1964. It is the only educational institution in Issaquena County.

From beginning in circa 1936-1941, during the era of racially segregated education, the county only had schools for black students. The State of Mississippi arranged for the dissolution of that school district as desegregation arrived, with the district closing in 1953.

== Communities ==
=== Town ===
- Mayersville

=== Census-designated places ===
- Grace
- Valley Park

=== Unincorporated communities ===
- Chotard
- Fitler
- Tallula

=== Ghost towns ===
- Arcadia
- Baleshed
- Ben Lomond
- Duncansby
- Magna Vista
- Shiloh
- Skipwith's Landing

== Parks and recreation ==
The South Delta School District holds a homecoming celebration. The local saying is that this is a "South Delta University" celebration; no such university exists.

== Notable people ==
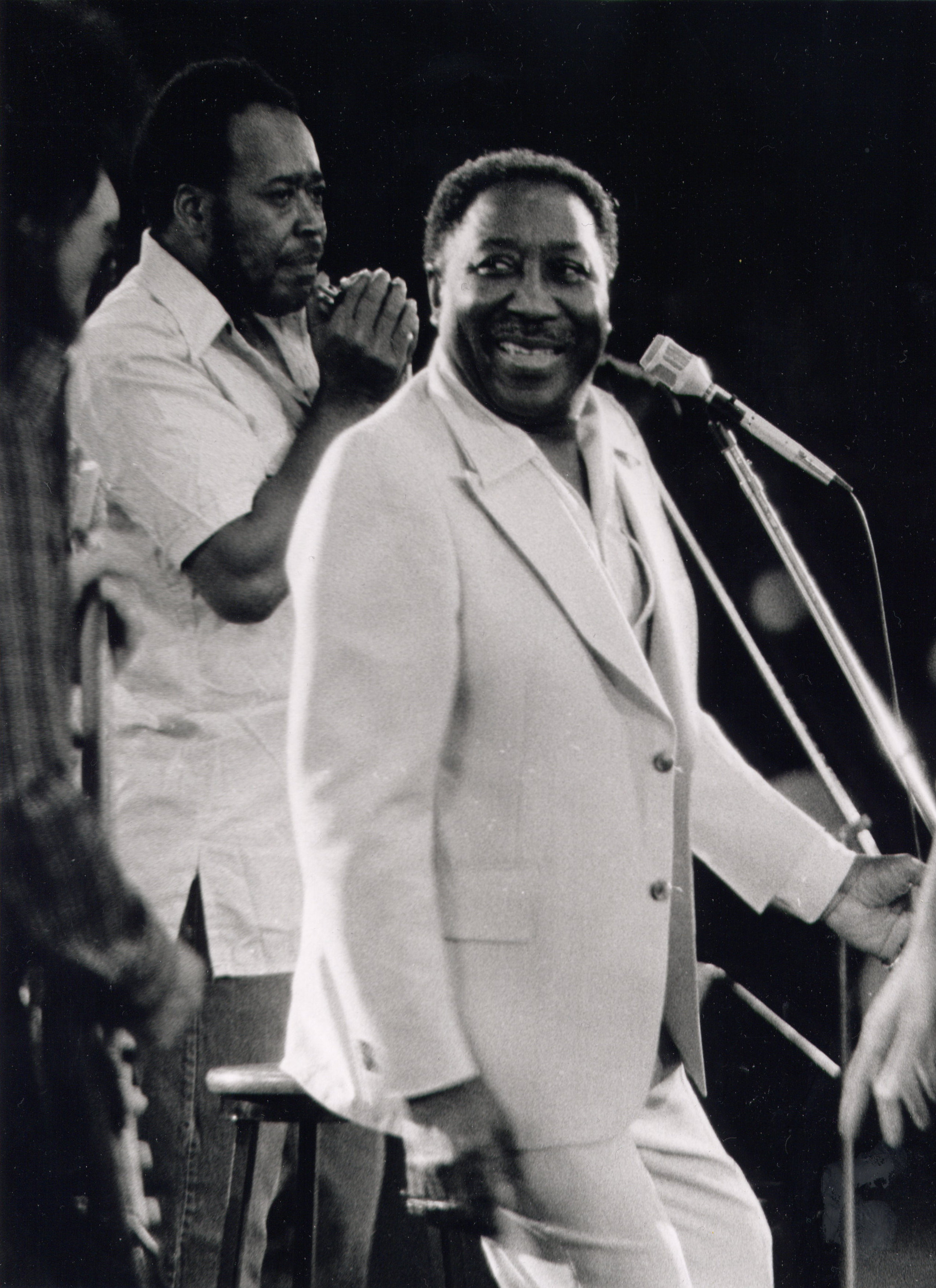
Muddy Waters

- Unita Blackwell, civil rights leader and mayor of Mayersville from 1976 to 2001; first female African-American mayor in Mississippi
- Charles C. Diggs, Sr., first African-American Democrat elected to the Michigan Senate; born in Tallula
- William Stamps Farish II, president of Standard Oil; born in Mayersville
- Muddy Waters, blues musician (1913–1983); born in "Jug's Corner"
- Eliza Winston, notable enslaved person

== See also ==
- Blackwell v. Issaquena County Board of Education, an important 1965 civil rights legal case
- National Register of Historic Places listings in Issaquena County, Mississippi
- Stack Island (Mississippi River)
