= The Oak Openings =

19th century American novel

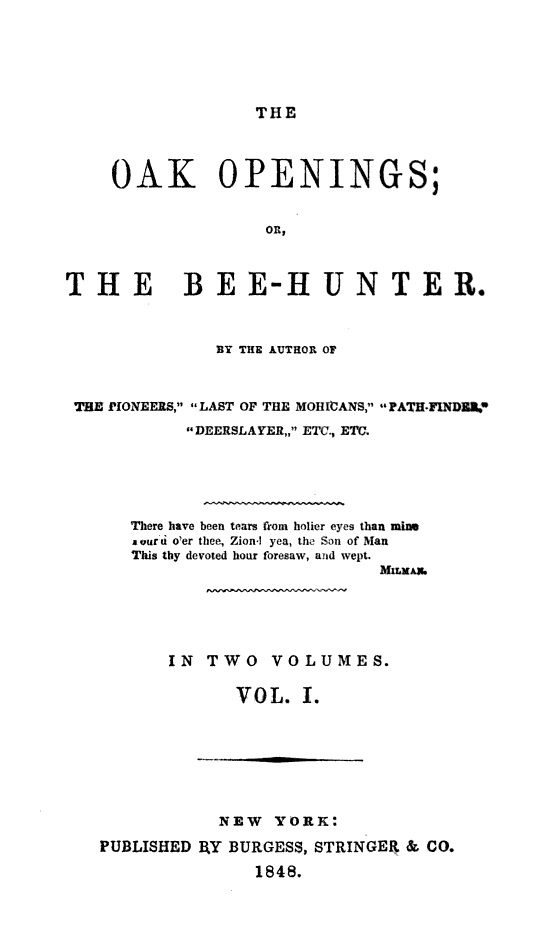
Title page, 1848

The Oak Openings; or, The Bee Hunter is an 1848 novel by James Fenimore Cooper. The novel focuses on the activities of professional honey-hunter Benjamin Boden, nicknamed "Ben Buzz". The novel is set in Kalamazoo, Michigan's Oak Opening, an oak savanna that still exists in part today, during the War of 1812.

== Background and publication history ==
After returning from his European travels in the 1830s, Cooper was persuaded by his niece's husband, Horace H. Comstock, to invest in Michigan real estate. The Potawatomi had ceded much of their land in central Michigan by 1833 and their former territory became known as "oak-openings". By 1837, Cooper's $6,000 investment was losing value, though he watched as his fellow New Yorkers attempted to colonize the area like honeybees. The experience inspired The Oak Openings; or, The Bee Hunter, and the novel became one of the first representations of beekeeping in American literature. Though not the first author to use the term "oak openings", Frederick Marryat did so, Cooper popularized the term for the type of oak clad Savannah with the publication of the novel.

The novel is Cooper's last "wilderness novel" following his Leatherstocking Tales and serves as a melancholy follow-up to that series. It is also the last of his novels to explore the relationships between Europeans and Native Americans in the early American expansion.

== Analysis ==
The novel has a significant religious thematic focus.

The novel explores assumptions about individual and Native American ownership of property, a continuation of issues that some of Cooper's other works deal with, as in the tract The American Democrat.

The main character, Benjamin Boden, is compared symbolically to the bees which he tends through nicknames like "Buzzing Ben" and the French term le Bourdon ("the drone"), which shows him as an industrious laborer.
