= Irma Clark-Coleman =

American politician (1937–2025)

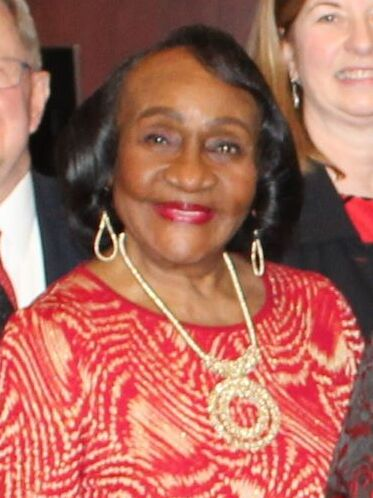
- Clark-Coleman in 2024

Member of the Wayne County Commission from the 5th district 6th District (2011–2012)
- In office January 1, 2011 – June 10, 2025
- Preceded by: Keith D. Williams

Member of the Michigan Senate from the 3rd district
- In office January 1, 2003 – January 1, 2011
- Preceded by: Raymond M. Murphy
- Succeeded by: Morris Hood III

Member of the Michigan House of Representatives from the 11th district
- In office January 1, 1999 – January 1, 2003
- Preceded by: Morris Hood, Jr.
- Succeeded by: Morris Hood III

Personal details
- Born: April 14, 1937 Georgia, U.S.
- Died: June 10, 2025 (aged 88)
- Party: Democratic
- Spouse: Ron
- Profession: Public administration

Irma Clark-Coleman (April 14, 1937 – June 10, 2025) was an American politician from Michigan. She was a Democratic member of the Michigan Senate, representing the 3rd district from 2003 to 2010. Previously she was a member of the Michigan House of Representatives from 1999 to 2002. She subsequently served on the Wayne County Commission from 2011 until her death.

== Early life and career ==
Clark-Coleman attended Detroit Public Schools and held a B.A. and M.A. in communications from Wayne State University. Beginning in 1967, she held a variety of positions in Wayne County government; starting as a stenographer, and eventually serving as assistant director for Public Information to the county Road Commission, Media Relations Manager for Wayne County Executive William Lucas, Press Secretary to County Executive Ed McNamara and Director of Human Relations. Clark Coleman retired from Wayne County in 1998.

== Political career ==
In 1991, Clark-Coleman was appointed to the Detroit Board of Education and served in that capacity until 1998. She served as the board's vice president and president (1996–1998).

Clark-Coleman was elected to the Michigan House of Representatives (district 11) in 1998 - and re-elected in 2000. In 2002, she was elected to the Michigan State Senate - and re-elected in 2006. She served on the Senate Appropriations Committee. Under the term limits provisions of Michigan's Constitution, She was barred from seeking re-election in 2010.

== Personal life and death ==
Clark-Coleman was married to Reverend Ron D. Coleman, Sr., pastor of God Land Unity Church. She had two children.

Clark-Coleman died on June 10, 2025, at the age of 88.

== Electoral history ==
- 2006 election for Michigan State Senate - Michigan 3rd District

Name	Percent
Irma Clark-Coleman (D) (inc.)	82.5%
Paul E. Sophiea (R)	17.5%

- 2006 election for Michigan State Senate - Michigan 3rd District (Democratic primary)

Name	Percent
Irma Clark-Coleman (inc.)	61.4%
Alison Vaughn	16.6%%

- 2002 election for Michigan State Senate - Michigan 3rd District

Name	Percent
Irma Clark-Coleman (D)	80.6%
Jose A. Hernandez II (R)	19.4%

- 2002 election for Michigan State Senate - Michigan 3rd District (Democratic primary)

Name	Percent
Irma Clark-Coleman	63.4%
Ronald J. Tafelski	15.7%
Doug Thomas	12.8%

Preceded by Raymond M. Murphy	State Senator from Michigan's 3rd District; 2003–2010	Succeeded by Morris Hood III
Preceded by Morris Hood, Jr.	State Representative from Michigan's 11th District; 1999–2002	Succeeded by Morris Hood III
