= Raymond W. Hood =

American politician (1936–2002)

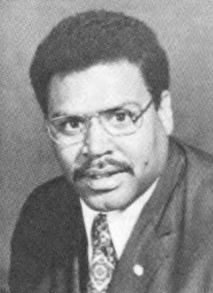

Member of the Michigan House of Representatives
- In office 1965–1982

Raymond W. Hood (January 1, 1936 – March 22, 2002) was an American politician.

Hood was born in Detroit, Michigan. He went to California State University, Fullerton and played on the football team. He worked with the Michigan State Department of Licensing and Regulations and was the director of the department. Hood served in the Michigan House of Representatives from 1965 to 1982 and was a Democrat. His brother Morris Hood Jr. and his nephew Morris Hood III also served in the Michigan Legislature. Hood died in Port Charlotte, Florida.
