= Chotard, Mississippi =

- Unincorporated community
- Location within Mississippi Location within the United States
- Coordinates: 32°35′26″N 91°01′20″W
- Country: United States
- State: Mississippi
- County: Issaquena
- Elevation: 98 ft (30 m)
- Time zone: UTC-6 (Central (CST))
  - Summer (DST): UTC-5 (CDT)
- GNIS feature ID: 711146

Chotard (also Chotard Landing and Woodland) is an unincorporated community in Issaquena County, Mississippi, United States.

Chotard originated as a postal village located directly on the Mississippi River, and had a population of 111 in 1900.

In 1934, the U.S. Army Corps of Engineers began construction of the Newman Cutoff, which created Chotard and Albemarle Lakes, both oxbow lakes, and removed Chotard from the contiguous Mississippi River.

Cottages now line the lake's edge at Chotard, and the community has become a destination for sport fishermen. The Chotard Landing Resort is located there, and a private boat launch may be accessed for a fee.
