= John Conyers III =

American politician

- Conyers in 2026

Member-elect of the Michigan Senate from the 3rd district
- Assuming office
- Succeeding: Stephanie Chang

Personal details
- Born: Detroit, Michigan, U.S.
- Party: Democratic
- Parent(s): John Conyers (father); Monica Conyers (mother)
- Education: Morehouse College; The New School

John James Conyers III is an American politician who is the Democratic member-elect for 3rd district of the Michigan Senate. Conyers ran in the 2018 special and regular elections to succeed his father, U.S. representative John Conyers, but failed to qualify in both elections.

== Early life and career ==
Conyers was born in Detroit, the son of U.S. representative John Conyers and councilwoman Monica Conyers. He graduated from Renaissance High School in Detroit, Morehouse College, and The New School.

Conyers wrote a memoir about his father titled "My Father's House: An Ode to America’s Longest-Serving Black Congressman" in 2025.

== Political career ==
=== 2018 congressional campaign ===
Conyers ran in the 2018 special and regular elections after his father resigned due to accusations of sexual misconduct in December 2017. Representative John Conyers endorsed his son a day after resigning, although Conyers was reportedly unsure about running. In both elections, he failed to qualify for the ballot.

=== Michigan Senate ===
In 2026, Conyers ran for the Michigan Senate's 3rd district to succeed term-limited incumbent Stephanie Chang. He placed first in the Democratic primary election with less than 25% of the vote in a crowded field of candidates. Following Conyers' winning the general election, The Detroit News reported that he had submitted numerous inaccurate campaign finance disclosures and failed to meet a post-election report deadline.

== Personal life ==
In February 2017, Conyers was charged with stabbing his then-girlfriend after an altercation between the two. The Los Angeles County District Attorney’s Office dropped the charges while the woman got a restraining order against Conyers. He denied stabbing her, stating she had drawn the knife on him and that the cuts were self-inflicted from the ensuing struggle.
