= Charles Diggs Sr. =

American politician (1894–1967)

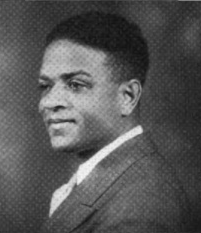

Member of the Michigan Senate from the 3rd district
- In office 1937–1944
- Preceded by: John Mankowski
- Succeeded by: Henry R. Kozak

Personal details
- Born: January 2, 1894 Tallula, Mississippi, U.S.
- Died: April 25, 1967 (aged 73) Detroit, Michigan, U.S.
- Resting place: Detroit Memorial Park
- Party: Republican at first, and then alternating between the Democratic and the Republican parties.
- Spouse: Mamie E. Jones-Diggs
- Profession: Mortician

Charles Coles Diggs Sr. (January 2, 1894 – April 25, 1967) was the first African-American Democrat elected to the Senate of the State of Michigan.

Born in Tallula, Mississippi, to James J. Diggs and Lilly Granderson, Diggs moved to Detroit in 1913, where he owned a successful funeral home on the lower east side.

== Political career ==
A follower of Marcus Garvey during the 1920s, Diggs first became involved in politics as a Republican, and then changed affiliation to the Democrats in 1932. Diggs was an early organizer of the Black Democratic Clubs in Detroit.

Diggs was a member of the Michigan State Senate from the 3rd District from 1937-1944, and was a delegate from Michigan to the 1940 Democratic National Convention.

Diggs gained a reputation as a friend of organized labor and a civil rights champion. Diggs had a personal story of traveling to Lansing in 1938 for his first session in the Legislature, and then being denied a room because of his race at the Olds Hotel across the street from the State Capitol. Diggs was forced to live during the week in one of Lansing's segregated neighborhoods. Diggs responded with a series of bills aimed at strengthening Michigan's civil rights laws, and the Diggs Law (Equal Accommodations Act of 1938—Act 117, signed by Governor Frank Murphy) made discriminatory service based on color, race or creed a misdemeanor.

In 1944, Diggs was defeated in the Democratic primary. Later, Diggs was an unsuccessful candidate for U.S. Representative from Michigan (1st District) as a Republican in the 1948 primary, and then as a Democrat in the 1952 primary.

== Criminal convictions ==
On January 22, 1944, Diggs and 19 other current or former state legislators were charged with accepting bribes. Diggs was convicted and sentenced to three-to-five years in prison. In 1945, Diggs was convicted in a different bribery case. On July 20, 1946, Diggs and 18 other legislators were charged with accepting bribes to vote against a banking bill. The case was dropped when the witness for the prosecution, Charles F. Hemans, refused to testify.

== Personal life and death ==
He was rooted in his family's business, the House of Diggs, which at one time was said to be Michigan's largest funeral home.

Diggs was father to politician Charles C Diggs, Jr. The elder Diggs was a member of the Elks.

Diggs committed suicide at Detroit Memorial Hospital after suffering a cerebral hemorrhage and a stroke, jumping from his fourth-floor hospital room window to his death. He was interred at Detroit Memorial Park in Warren.
