= Skipwith's Landing, Mississippi =

Former populated place in Mississippi

- Ghost town
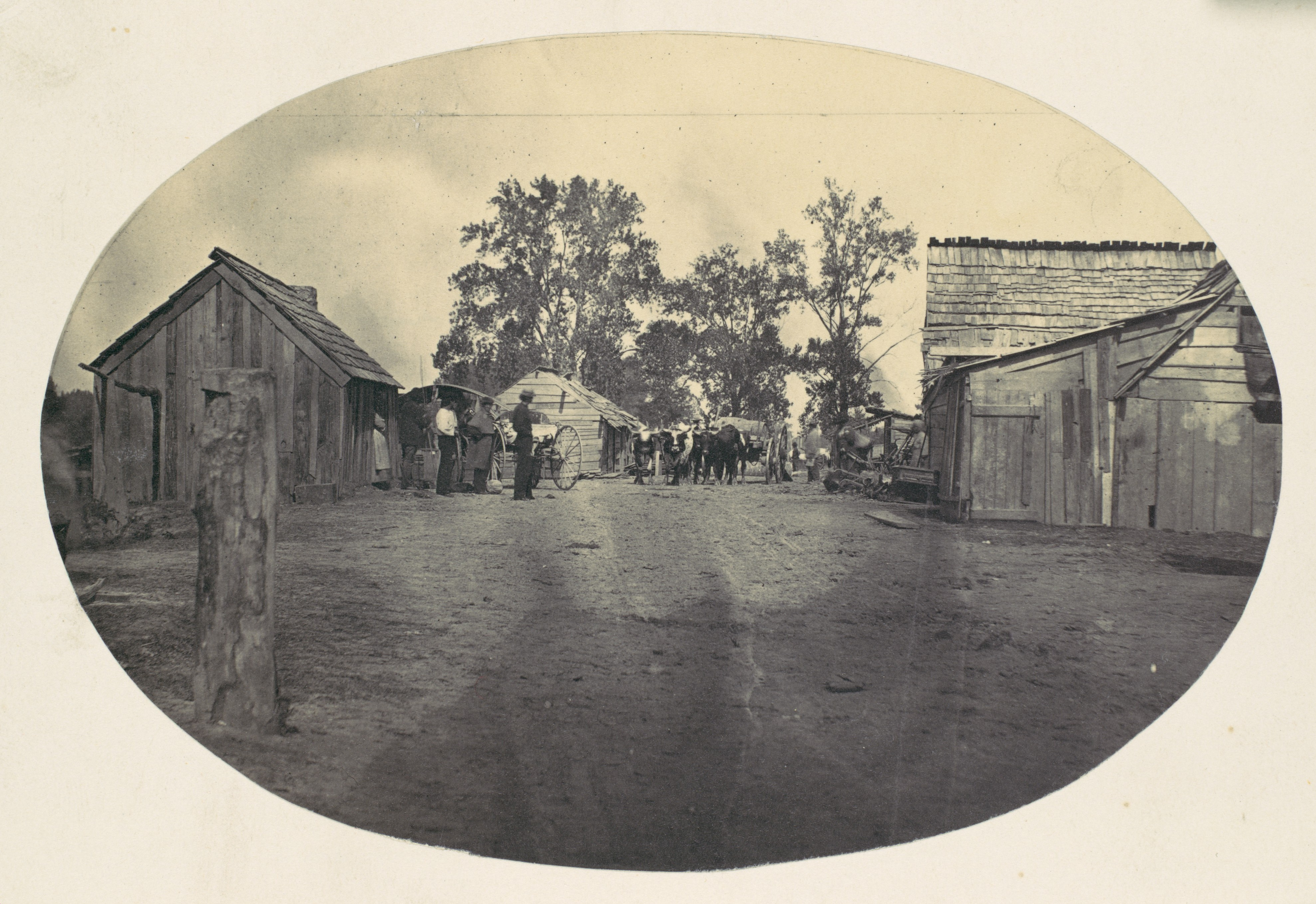
- Skipwith's Landing, 1864

- Location within Mississippi Location within the United States
- Coordinates: 32°58′58″N 91°05′20″W
- Country: United States
- State: Mississippi
- County: Issaquena
- Time zone: UTC-6 (Central (CST))
  - Summer (DST): UTC-5 (CDT)

Skipwith's Landing was a 19th-century boat landing and human settlement on the east bank of the Mississippi River, located in the county of Issaquena in the U.S. state of Mississippi. Skipwith's Landing was situated about 55 mi (89 km) to 100 mi (160 km) north of Vicksburg, Mississippi, depending on mode of travel.

== History ==
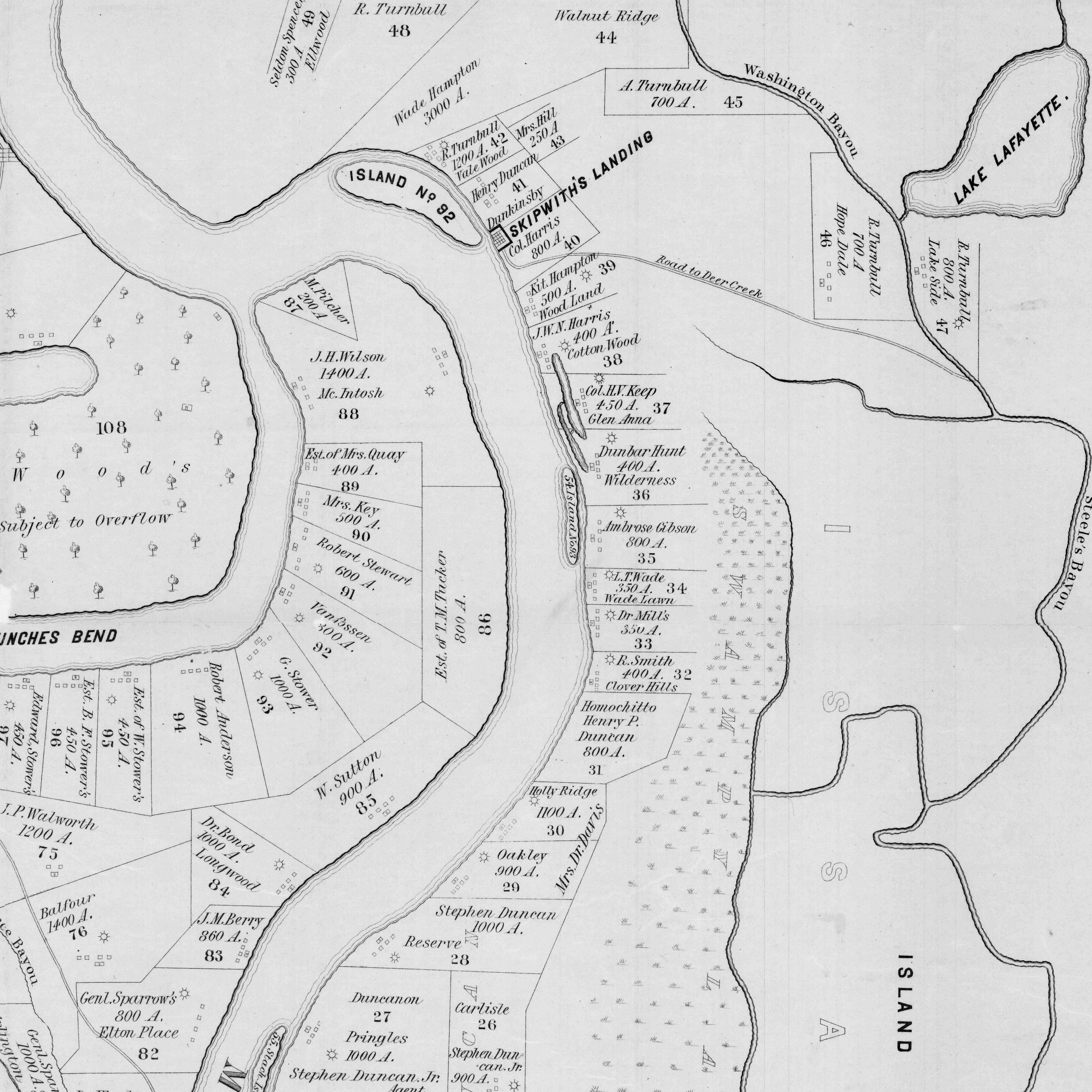
Part of Issaquena County, mapped c. 1866–1874

As of 1858, the main attraction of Skipwith's Landing was that General Hampton's plantation was seven miles away. The "settlement" itself was but a "small wooden hut" surrounded by pine woods. "General Hampton" (possibly Wade Hampton II) reportedly owned huge tracts of land in the vicinity of Skipwith's Landing and once had 200 slaves moved there. Steamboats of the era were fueled by wood, and burned something like 70 cords of wood per day. Therefore, there were "hundreds of wood yards" along the Mississippi during the steamboat era, "one every several miles on the busiest sections of the river." According to The Half Has Never Been Told, the cotton empire of the Mississippi River valley opened a "new frontier" along the river above Vicksburg in the late 1840s, so Skipwith's Landing may have been established in the late 1840s or in the 1850s. In addition to exporting cotton, the landing would have been used to import enslaved people who grew that cotton and made up roughly 80 percent of the percent of the antebellum population of the area.

Skipwith's Landing was used as an anchorage and crewing site for gunboats during the American Civil War. The U.S. Navy also kept coal barges and eventually built a repair and carpentry shop there. Skipwith's Landing was opposite Island 92. The Sam Gaty sank nearby in 1863. Circa 1866, a witness at a U.S. Congressional hearing described Skipwith's Landing as being among the most sparsely populated sections of the state with no village or town in proximity. Circa 1867, there were no roads leading to or from Skipwith's Landing; the only access was by the river.

After the war the Freedmen's Bureau sent an agent to the landing to encourage freedmen to maintain a new attitude of freedom, take testimony in their jurisdiction and demand labor contracts be drawn up for their protection. There was a U.S. post office at Skipwith's in 1870. Some reported that Skipwith Landing's major municipal advantage was that it had a store that sold liquor. For a time there was a cut made by the river that was known as Skipwith's Chute. Skipwith Crevasse was a spot where the river had pushed through and was likely to cut a new course if not blockaded.

Then Duncansby Landing opened 100 yards above Skipwith's Landing and became the dominant settlement in the vicinity, and by 1887, Duncansby reportedly had a population of about 100 people and Skipwith had faded off the map.

== See also ==
- Columbia, Arkansas
- Mississippi River in the American Civil War
- Fulwar Skipwith
