= Horace H. Comstock =

American politician

Member of the Michigan Senate from the 3rd district
- In office November 2, 1835 – January 6, 1839

Member of the Michigan House of Representatives from the Allegan County district
- In office January 1, 1849 – January 6, 1850

Personal details
- Born: c. 1807 Laurens, New York
- Died: March 15, 1861 (aged 53–54) Ossining, New York
- Party: Democratic

Horace Hawkins Comstock (c. 1807 – March 15, 1861) was an American businessman, lawyer, and politician. He was very successful in business as a young man, purchased large quantities of land in the Michigan Territory in the early 1830s, founded the town of Comstock, Michigan, and served multiple terms in the Michigan Legislature. He built a reputation as a generous and helpful citizen, but following the death of his first wife, his family began to fall apart and his finances suffered, and he died intestate with little of his fortune left.

His first wife was the niece of author James Fenimore Cooper, whose time spent at Comstock's house in Kalamazoo, Michigan, helped inspire his novel The Oak Openings. Comstock's son Bill Comstock became a frontier scout who worked under General George A. Custer and gained fame for losing a buffalo-shooting contest with Buffalo Bill Cody over the right to use the nickname "Buffalo".

== Biography ==
Horace Hawkins Comstock was born about 1807 to William Comstock and Frinda Hawkins, of Laurens, New York. His father was an affluent member of the community and had reached the rank of general in the area militia. Comstock studied law and went into the Indian Trade between Chicago and Detroit, and by the age of 25 he had amassed a fortune. He began to buy up large quantities of cheap land in the Michigan Territory beginning in 1831; he labored on the land himself, unlike some speculators, and was known to be helpful and generous with those around him. People throughout the area called him General Comstock, though he did not have a military background himself. His fortune at the time was said to be $60,000 (equivalent to $1,814,063 in 2025).

He established the village of Comstock, Michigan, where he built a gristmill, ran a store, and acted as the postmaster. When he built a schoolhouse, the people of the area named the surrounding township Comstock Township after him. He built warehouses and docks along the Kalamazoo River in an attempt to turn the village into a trading center, and undertook an unsuccessful campaign to have it named the seat of Kalamazoo County, even though the town of Kalamazoo had already been selected.

=== Business with James Fenimore Cooper ===
On November 7, 1833, Comstock married Sarah Sabina Cooper in Cooperstown, New York. She was the daughter of Isaac Cooper, brother of the author James Fenimore Cooper. The Comstocks had a daughter, Sarah Sabina, who was born in Cooperstown the following year. While his wife was in Cooperstown, Comstock built a large home in Michigan for them, called Comstock Hall. Not long after she joined him, the neighboring township was renamed Cooper Township, Michigan, after her.

While he was visiting Cooperstown in June 1834, James Fenimore Cooper met Comstock, who he found to be a "respectable young man". Comstock persuaded him to invest in land as equal partners with him, though Cooper was putting up all the capital, in the form of a $6,000 line of credit he obtained in May 1835 from City Bank of New York, secured with personal notes from Gorham A. Worth and Cooper's partner in the cotton business, James D. P. Ogden. By that October, Cooper wanted out of the deal, due to financial pressure from losses on cotton, but Comstock persuaded him to let Comstock buy Cooper out in installments over fifteen months.

In 1836, Comstock paid the first two of the four notes he had given Cooper. Short of hard cash for the remaining two, he substituted a mortgage of Michigan banker Sidney Ketchum's that he held. As Ketchum's own financial fortunes faded, he in turn substituted additional instruments that blurred the responsibility for the debt to the point that Comstock and Cooper spent many years in court trying to recover their money. Cooper was partially successful in this, though by the time of his death in 1851, he had still not recovered all of what he was owed. These legal battles required Cooper to make five trips to Michigan beginning in June 1847, including three visits to Kalamazoo to check on a number of properties that Comstock had transferred to him in 1841 as partial repayment. The information he gathered about the Midwest and the Kalamazoo area helped Cooper formulate the new novel he began in 1848, The Oak Openings, which was set in the area around Kalamazoo.

=== Political career ===
The residents of Michigan Territory approved a state constitution in 1835, hoping to force Congress to act on their desire for statehood. Statehood did not come until 1837, but an election for a new state legislature was held in 1835 in any case. Comstock was elected as a Democrat to represent Kalamazoo County in the new Michigan Senate, and was re-elected twice, serving four years in total.

Despite losing out to Kalamazoo as the county seat, he promised to loan that city $6,000 (equivalent to $175,909 in 2025) in 1836 in order to build a courthouse. But he invested $17,000 (equivalent to $483,750 in 2025) in a one-quarter interest in the property covered by the city's plat the following year, and after the Panic of 1837 and the ensuing collapse of land prices, he was unable to follow through. In 1839, he was appointed a general in the state militia, in command of a division.

=== Decline and death ===
From 1840 to 1844, Comstock served as the supervisor of Comstock Township, and he and Sarah had three more children, Julia Hamilton, William Averill, and Frances Oathwaite. Comstock moved his family into a mansion in Kalamazoo. Sarah Comstock died on February 15, 1846, and Comstock's finances and personal life began to suffer irreparably. He moved to Otsego, Michigan, in 1848, and was elected for one term in the Michigan House of Representatives in 1849. He married 17-year-old Betsey Belcher on July 16, 1849, and the following year moved back to Ossining, New York.

He married a third time, to Elizabeth Graves, who died at Ossining on June 6, 1860, and he remarried again, to a woman named Catherine. Comstock himself died at Ossining on March 15, 1861; he was intestate, and his brother Daniel petitioned to become executor of the estate, which he estimated to be less than $1,000 (equivalent to $35,833 in 2025).

=== Family ===
Following his wife Sarah's death in 1846, Comstock sent his children to live with relatives, and put one up for adoption, before moving back to New York. Sabina, the eldest daughter, was sent to live with a widowed aunt in Whitewater, Wisconsin. Julia remained in Otsego with Comstock's second wife Betsey, who herself lived with her parents, before returning to Cooperstown. Frances, or Fannie, was adopted by a Kalamazoo stageline operator named Bissel Humphrey.

Will lived briefly with his uncles in Corning, New York, before being adopted by a family in Wisconsin. The family moved to Kansas, where Bill Comstock, as he became known, grew into a sought-after frontier scout. General George A. Custer specifically requested his services, and he worked for a time alongside Wild Bill Hickok for Custer's 7th Cavalry. He also became known for losing to Buffalo Bill Cody in the buffalo-shooting contest the two held to determine the right to use that nickname. He was killed on August 16, 1868, while trying to negotiate peace with a Cheyenne chief named Turkey Leg during the violence that followed a raid on Saline Valley the previous week.

== Notes ==
- Durant, Samuel W. (1880), History of Kalamazoo County, Michigan, Philadelphia: Everts & Abbott – via HathiTrust
- Franklin, Wayne (2017), James Fenimore Cooper: The Later Years, Yale University Press, ISBN 978-0-300-13571-8
- Gray, John S. (1970), "Will Comstock, Scout: The Natty Bumppo of Kansas", Montana: The Magazine of Western History, 20 (3): 2–15, ISSN 0026-9891, JSTOR 4517480
- Lanman, Charles (1871), The Red Book of Michigan: A Civil, Military and Biographical History, Detroit: E. B. Smith & Company, ISBN 978-1-4255-6156-7
- Streeter, Floyd B. (January 1918), "The Factional Character of Early Michigan Politics", Michigan History, vol. 2, no. 1, Lansing: Michigan Historical Commission, pp. 165–191
- Wright, Wayne W. (1983), The Cooper Genealogy, New York State Historical Association, archived from the original on 2018-11-14
