= Tallula, Mississippi =

Unincorporated community

- Unincorporated community
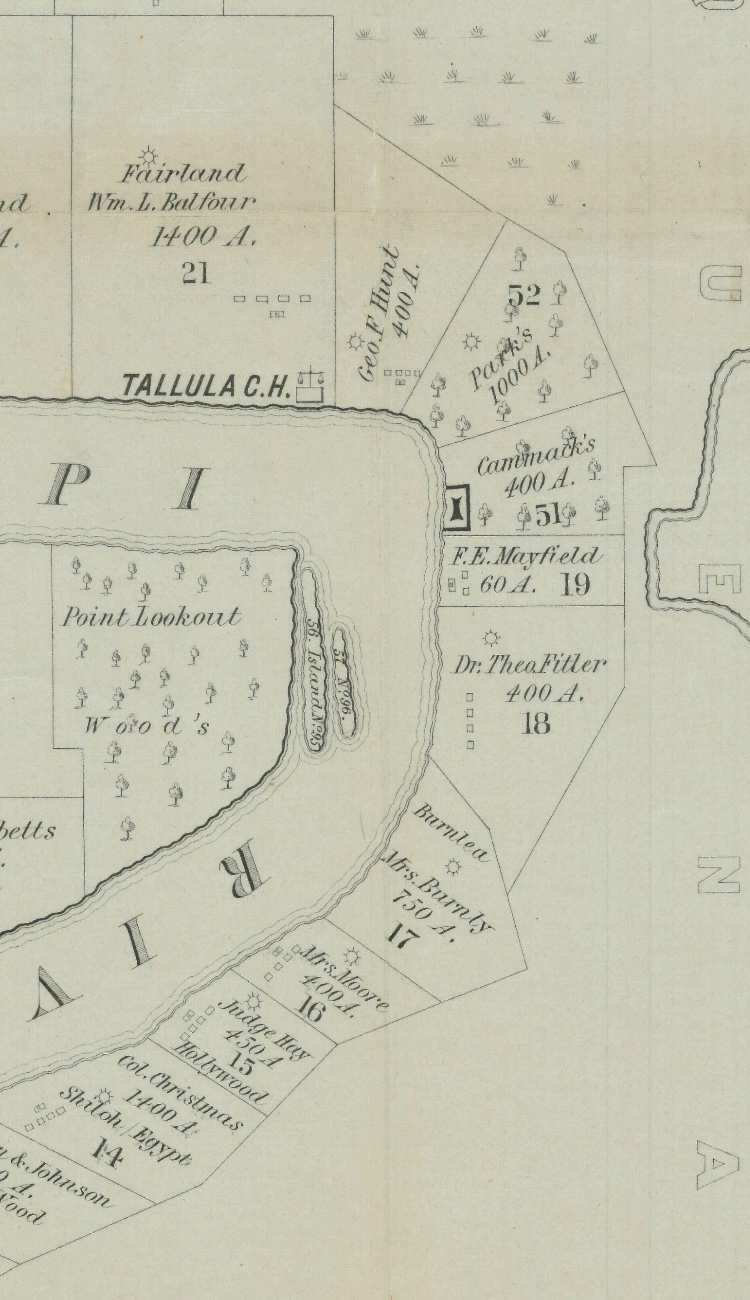
- Tallula C.H. (Courthouse) on a map prepared by the U.S. government shortly after the American Civil War

- Location within Mississippi Location within the United States
- Coordinates: 32°46′46″N 91°06′52″W
- Country: United States
- State: Mississippi
- County: Issaquena
- Elevation: 102 ft (31 m)
- Time zone: UTC-6 (Central (CST))
  - Summer (DST): UTC-5 (CDT)
- GNIS feature ID: 678549

Tallula is an unincorporated community in Issaquena County, Mississippi, United States. Tallula was the county seat from 1848 to 1871.

== History ==
Tallula is a name derived from the Choctaw language purported to mean either (sources vary) "bell" or "to break off". The settlement was originally located on a spot along the Mississippi River called Tallula Bend.

Tallula was the Issaquena county seat from 1848 to 1871. Runaway slaves captured in Issaquena were held in the Tallula jail until they were claimed by their legal owners or sold for jail fees. In 1856 the sheriff of Issaquena County offered a $250 reward for the recapture of a "negro stealer" named John Guydon who "broke jail" at Tallula.

The county seat moved to Mayersville, 10 mi (16 km) north, in 1871. Over time, the changing course of the Mississippi "left Island No. 95 on the Louisiana shore, and Tallula Bend moved slowly downstream until the town of Tallula lost its landing and became an inland village."

== Notable person ==
Charles C. Diggs, Sr., the first African-American Democrat elected to the Michigan Senate, was born in Tallula.
