= Morris Hood Jr. =

American politician from Michigan

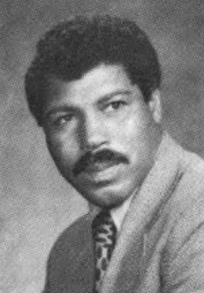

Member of the Michigan House of Representatives
- In office January 1, 1971 – October 7, 1998
- Preceded by: George F. Montgomery Jr.
- Succeeded by: Irma Clark-Coleman
- Constituency: 21st district (1971–1972); 6th district (1973–1992); 11th district (1993–1998)

Personal details
- Born: June 5, 1934 Detroit, Michigan, US
- Died: October 7, 1998 (aged 64) Detroit, Michigan, US
- Party: Democratic
- Children: Morris Hood III (son)
- Relatives: Raymond W. Hood (brother)
- Education: Wayne State University

Military service
- Allegiance: United States
- Branch/service: United States Army
- Years of service: 1954–1956

Morris Hood Jr. (June 5, 1934 – October 7, 1998) was a Democratic member of the Michigan House of Representatives, representing part of Detroit from 1971 until his death in 1998.

== Early life ==
Born in Detroit in 1934, Hood served in the United States Army and attended Wayne State University.

== Career ==
In 1970, he was elected to the House, and was re-elected 14 times. (His last term was the last he could have served under Michigan's term limits.) While in the House, Hood chaired the Appropriations Committee.

Hood served as a delegate to four Democratic National Conventions.

Hood was a forceful champion of education for the underserved as well as for mental health services. His consistent views differentiated him as a legislator. The decision that he would lay in state in the Capitol at his death was testimony to the esteem of his legislative colleagues.

He was the primary founder of the King-Chavez-Parks Initiative scholarship program.

== Personal life ==
Hood died of a heart attack on October 7, 1998. His body lay in state in the Capitol rotunda, the first legislator to receive the honor.

Hood's brother Raymond W. Hood, and his son Morris Hood III, also both served in the Michigan Legislature.
