= Morris Hood III =

American politician (1965–2020)

Member of the Michigan Senate from the 3rd district
- In office January 1, 2011 – January 1, 2019
- Preceded by: Irma Clark-Coleman
- Succeeded by: Sylvia Santana

Member of the Michigan House of Representatives from the 11th district
- In office January 1, 2003 – January 1, 2009
- Preceded by: Irma Clark
- Succeeded by: David Nathan

Personal details
- Born: May 21, 1965 Detroit, Michigan, US
- Died: May 11, 2020 (aged 54) Detroit, Michigan, US
- Cause of death: COVID-19
- Party: Democratic
- Relations: Raymond W. Hood (uncle)
- Parent: Morris Hood Jr. (father)
- Education: Henry Ford College; Wayne State University

Morris W. Hood III (May 21, 1965 – May 11, 2020) was an American politician who served as a member of the Michigan Senate. He represented District 3, encompassing Dearborn, Melvindale, and a portion of Detroit from 2011 to 2018.

== Early life and education ==
Hood was born in Detroit. He went to Wayne State University and Henry Ford College. Hood was the son of Morris Hood Jr. and the nephew of Raymond W. Hood.

== Career ==
Prior to his election to the legislature, Hood was a production technician at Ford Motor Company's Dearborn Engine & Fuel Tank Plant. He was an unsuccessful candidate for the House in 1998. Hood was elected to the Michigan House of Representatives in 2003, serving for three terms. He was elected to the Michigan Senate in 2010, also serving as the Michigan Senate Minority Floor Leader until 2018. He was unable to run for re-election due to term limits, and was succeeded by Sylvia Santana. Hood won his father's legislative seat, as he was the son of former Michigan State Rep. Morris Hood Jr., who died in 1998. Due to term limits, Hood went to work in Wayne County administration after his stint in the Michigan State senate ended. Hood III, a widower, was survived by his second wife Chavon Hood. Michigan Governor Gretchen Whitmer, a former state lawmaker herself and colleague of Hood, called him "a dear friend and proud Detroiter dedicated to community service".

== Death ==
Hood died from COVID-19 on May 11, 2020, during the COVID-19 pandemic in Michigan.
