= McEachern High School =

Public high school in Powder Springs, Georgia, United States

John McEachern High School

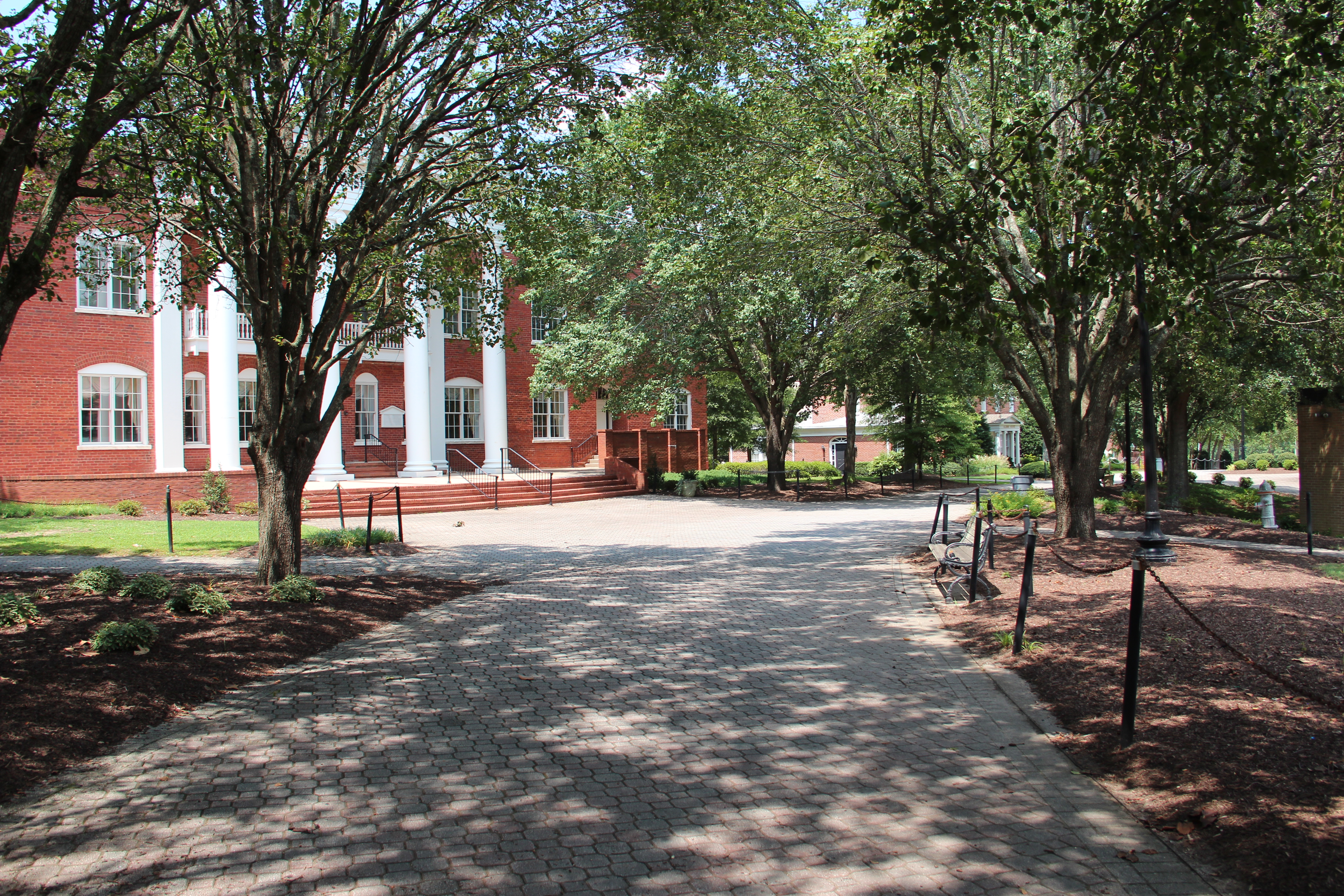
- McEachern High School in 2016

Location
- 2400 New Macland Road; Powder Springs, Georgia 30127; United States; 33°53′46″N 84°40′41″W

Information
- Former name: Seventh District Agricultural and Mechanical School
- Type: Public high school
- Established: 1933; 93 years ago
- School district: Cobb County School District
- Principal: Krystal Wattley
- Teaching staff: 125.80 (on an FTE basis)
- Grades: 9–12
- Enrollment: 2,175 (2024–2025)
- Student to teacher ratio: 17.29
- Colors: Blue and gold
- Mascot: Indians
- Rival: Hillgrove High School; Marietta High School
- Website: cobbk12.org/McEachern

John McEachern High School is a public high school in Cobb County, Georgia, United States. It has a Powder Springs post office address.

It was originally established in 1933 as the Seventh District Agricultural and Mechanical School. Due to its history, McEachern has an open campus, with its buildings spaced across the property.

It is one of 17 high schools in the Cobb County School District.

== History ==
John Newton McEachern, co-founder of the Life of Georgia Insurance Company, displayed an early interest in the education of young people. Mr. McEachern's financial support and his donation of 240 acres of land enabled the establishment of a new school in the Macland community. His endeavors inspired further donations for the school from civic-minded citizens. From these efforts an ambitious building project began. As a result of the work and dedication of Mr. McEachern and the community, the Seventh District Agricultural and Mechanical School opened in February 1908.

The students selected the Indians for their school mascot under Principal Julian Garrison in the early 1950s.

Between 1970 and 1975, enrollment at all grade levels increased to the point that a transfer of first through eighth grades to other schools in the area was necessary. The campus became one school known as John McEachern High School in 1975.

== Notable alumni ==
- Morris Almond – drafted 25th overall by the Utah Jazz in the 2007 NBA Draft; played for Rice University; first basketball player in McEachern school history to have his jersey retired
- Kofi Amichia – offensive guard for the Green Bay Packers; graduated in 2012
- Tremayne Anchrum – Super Bowl Champion and Guard for the Los Angeles Rams of the National Football League (NFL). He played college football at Clemson; graduated in 2016
- Rory Anderson – football tight end for the San Francisco 49ers of the NFL; drafted in the 7th round of the 2015 NFL draft by the 49ers; played college football at South Carolina; graduated in 2011
- Bryce Archie - MLB pitcher and former college football quarterback
- Ace Bailey - NBA player; drafted 5th in the first round of the 2025 NBA Draft by the Utah Jazz; graduated in 2024
- Javon Baker – NFL wide receiver for the New England Patriots; graduated in 2020
- Gregg Bishop – film director, screenwriter and producer
- Dylan Cardwell - center for Auburn Univ., NCAA 2025 Men's Basketball Final Four; signed with the Sacramento Kings in 2025; graduated in 2020
- Sharife Cooper – point guard for the Washington Wizards, drafted 48th in the 2nd round of the 2021 NBA Draft by the Atlanta Hawks; graduated in 2020
- Te'a Cooper – point guard for the Los Angeles Sparks, drafted 18th in the 2nd round of the 2020 WNBA Draft; graduated in 2015
- Elle Duncan – sports anchor for ESPN, former V103 traffic reporter, tv host, actress and television personality
- Makenzie Dunmore – Sprinter; graduated in 2016
- Chuma Edoga – offensive tackle for the New York Jets, drafted 92nd in the 3rd round; played college for the University of Southern California; graduated in 2015
- Lissa Endriga – international model; TV host of the travel show Destination X
- Trae Golden – professional basketball player; graduated in 2010
- B.J. Green – defensive end for Arizona State and Colorado; transferred his senior year
- Ted Laurent – defensive lineman for the Hamilton Tiger-Cats and Ole Miss Rebels; graduated in 2007
- Mark David Lee – lead guitarist for the four-time Grammy Award-winning band Third Day; graduated in 1991
- Gerald McRath – linebacker for Southern Miss.; drafted by the Tennessee Titans in the 2009 NFL draft as an outside linebacker; graduated in 2004
- Adam Meadows – four-year starter for the University of Georgia; drafted by the Indianapolis Colts
- Patrick N. Millsaps – Chief of Staff of Newt Gingrich's 2012 presidential campaign; political analyst on Fox News, CNN and MSNBC; graduated in 1991
- Isaac Okoro – small forward for the Cleveland Cavaliers, drafted 5th overall in the 2020 NBA Draft; played for Auburn University; graduated in 2019
- Chris Pope – Internet personality; executive producer; celebrity social media publicist; co-founder of Guys from Andromeda LLC
- Mac Powell – lead singer of the four-time Grammy Award-winning band Third Day; graduated in 1991
- Victor Scott II – MLB outfielder; graduated in 2019
- Doc Shaw – actor, best known for role as Malik Payne in Tyler Perry's House of Payne
- Josh Smith – NBA basketball player
