= Patrick N. Millsaps =

American lawyer and film producer (born 1973)

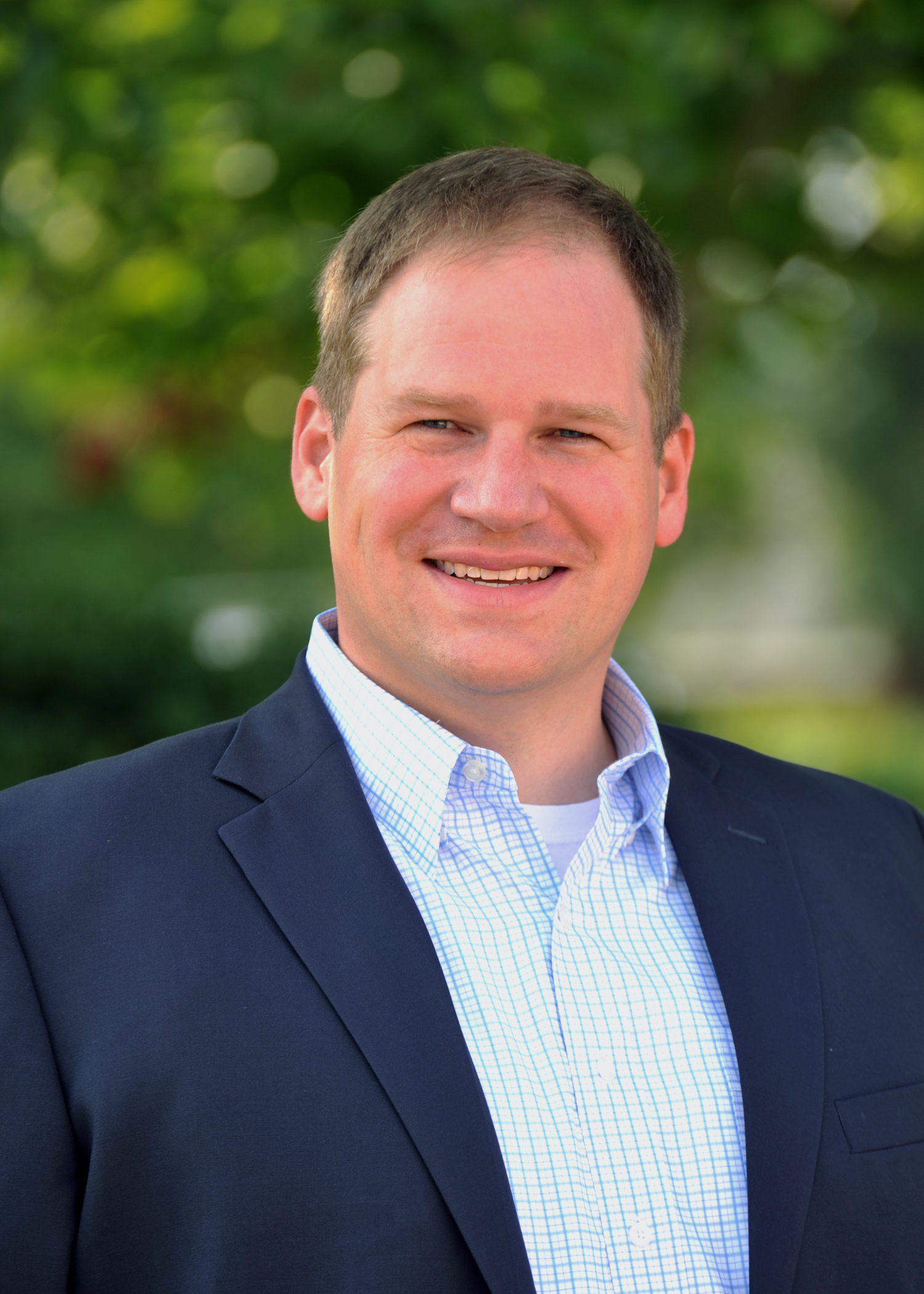
- Millsaps in 2011
- Born: Patrick Neill Millsaps; March 16, 1973 (age 53); Knoxville, Tennessee, United States
- Education: Samford University (BA); University of Georgia School of Law (JD)
- Occupations: Attorney; film producer
- Employer: Kane Studio, LLC
- Political party: Independent
- Website: kanestudio.com

Patrick Neill Millsaps (born March 16, 1973) is an American attorney and film producer.

== Early life and education ==
Millsaps was born in Knoxville, Tennessee, and grew up in Cobb County, Georgia. He attended McEachern High School, then University of Georgia School of Law in 1997 where he earned his Juris Doctor degree in 2000.

== Legal and political careers ==
=== Legal career ===
After being admitted to the State Bar of Georgia in 2000, Millsaps began practicing under the guidance of criminal defense attorneys Ed Garland and Don Samuel.

In 2001, six months after receiving his bar license, Millsaps filed the first lawsuit on behalf of a charter school against a school district in Georgia. Millsaps represented Stone Mountain Charter School in a lawsuit against the DeKalb County School District regarding funding. The suit argued that the school board allocated less funding per student than other schools in the district. The case was settled, and the school board denied wrongdoing.

In 2004, Millsaps founded his own law firm, which merged in 2011 with Hall Booth Smith, where he became a partner. In 2008, he served as special counsel on behalf of the Georgia Department of Community Health to Governor Sonny Perdue.

=== Political career ===
On December 26, 2011 Millsaps joined Newt Gingrich's 2012 campaign for the Republican presidential nomination as a deputy general counsel. After working on the campaign through the South Carolina primary, he was appointed chief of staff following a reorganization after the Florida primary.

== Film and television career ==
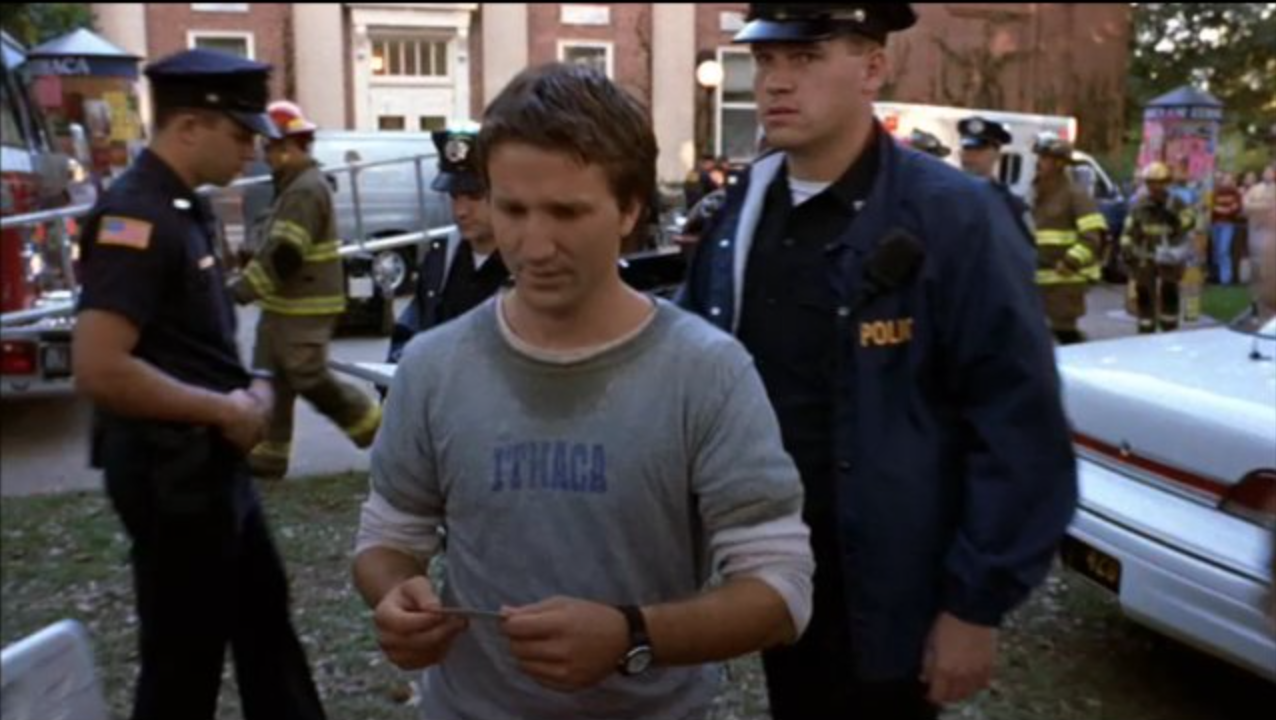
Patrick Millsaps in Road Trip

Millsaps worked as a talent manager before moving into film production. Georgia Governor Sonny Perdue credited Millsaps for contributing to legislation establishing film and television tax incentives in the state. His first film as an executive producer came about when a principal backer of the film, representing 20% of the budget, withdrew five days before filming was scheduled to begin. He served as an executive producer on I'll See You in My Dreams.

In December 2015, Millsaps founded Londonderry Entertainment, a talent management and production company. The company was later reorganized into three subsidiaries focused on film finance and production, television and digital media finance and production, and film marketing. Londonderry ceased operations in 2018.

In 2016, Millsaps criticized a proposed "religious liberty" bill in the Georgia General Assembly, arguing that it could lead to a boycott of the state by film and television productions. Georgia Governor Nathan Deal later vetoed the bill.

In 2019, Millsaps founded Kane Studio, a real estate development company, to develop a production studio project in Georgia. According to reporting at the time, the project was planned for an Opportunity Zone and was described as a film and television production facility on a 1,500-acre site, including more than 650,000 square feet of sound stages.

== Letter to Ariana Grande ==
Following the May 2017 Manchester Arena bombing at an Ariana Grande concert, Millsaps wrote an open letter to Grande encouraging her to return to performing when she felt ready. According to press coverage, Grande and several other musicians liked the letter. In 2018, it was included in ''Letters to Change the World: From Pankhurst to Orwell'', edited by Travis Elborough.
