= Newt Gingrich 2012 presidential campaign =

American political campaign

Newt Gingrich for President 2012
- Campaign: 2012 Republican Party presidential primaries
- Candidate: Newt Gingrich; Former U.S. Representative from Georgia's 6th district (1979-1999); 50th Speaker of the House (1995-1999)
- Affiliation: Republican Party
- Status: Suspended (May 2, 2012)
- Headquarters: Atlanta, Georgia
- Key people: Vince Haley (Manager); Patrick Millsaps (Chief of Staff (February 3 – May 2, 2012)); R.C. Hammond (Press Secretary); Joe DeSantis (Communications Director); Amy Pass (Finance Coordinator)
- Receipts: US$24,110,410 (2011-06-30)

Website
- Newt 2012 (archived - May 1, 2012)

The 2012 presidential campaign of Newt Gingrich, former U.S. Representative of Georgia and Speaker of the House, was formally launched on May 11, 2011, through a video posted on Facebook and YouTube, following the establishment of an exploratory committee on March 3 and speculation about a potential run for the office.

Gingrich gained national prominence during the 1994 midterm elections due to his efforts to unify the Republican Party's campaigns under a single platform, dubbed the "Contract with America." The elections led to the Republican Party controlling both chambers of Congress. Gingrich was subsequently elected as Speaker, holding the office until his resignation from the House at the beginning of the 106th Congress's term in 1999. Afterward, Gingrich would chair various think tanks, occasionally serving as a commentator on Fox News.

Gingrich's platform, dubbed the "21st Century Contract with America," proposed repealing the Affordable Care Act, which he characterized as "unconstitutional, unaffordable, unworkable and stunningly unfair." Gingrich also pledged to decrease the power of the judicial branch to centralize lawmaking efforts within the executive and legislative branches, citing concerns about "activist" and "lawless" judges. Other tenets included increasing law enforcement at the Mexico–United States border, and opposition to the legalization of same-sex marriage.

The campaign was hampered early on, when Gingrich gaffed in criticizing the House Republicans' budget plan during an appearance on Meet the Press, as well as the revelation that he and his wife, Callista, had incurred a debt of hundreds of thousands of dollars at a jewelry store. In June 2011, eighteen of Gingrich's staffers resigned over disagreements regarding the campaign's lax schedule, particularly noting his choice to vacation on a cruise in the Greek isles. By early December, however, Gingrich had been forecasted as the frontrunner, primarily due to support from the party's conservative bloc and the Tea Party movement, although his performance had begun to wane later on in the month as Mitt Romney, a more moderate candidate, gained more support.

Despite Gingrich's victory in the South Carolina primary, his performance quickly worsened, mainly marred by problems with staffing and heavy debt. Following a rally in Florida prior to the state's primary elections, Gingrich's potential handling of the economy was further called into question by commentators and rivals when he proposed to have a moon colony built by 2020. Following a poor performance in Nevada on February 4, the campaign began to increasingly focus on building support among Southern voters, deliberately avoiding campaigning in states where his polling was poor. After only managing to win Georgia, his home state, on Super Tuesday (March 6), Gingrich continued to underperform as his media coverage dropped, culminating with his decision to suspend his campaign after winning merely 26% of the vote to Romney's 56% in the Delaware primary on April 24. Gingrich announced the suspension on May 2 at a hotel ballroom in Washington, D.C., publicly endorsing Romney four days later.

== Background ==
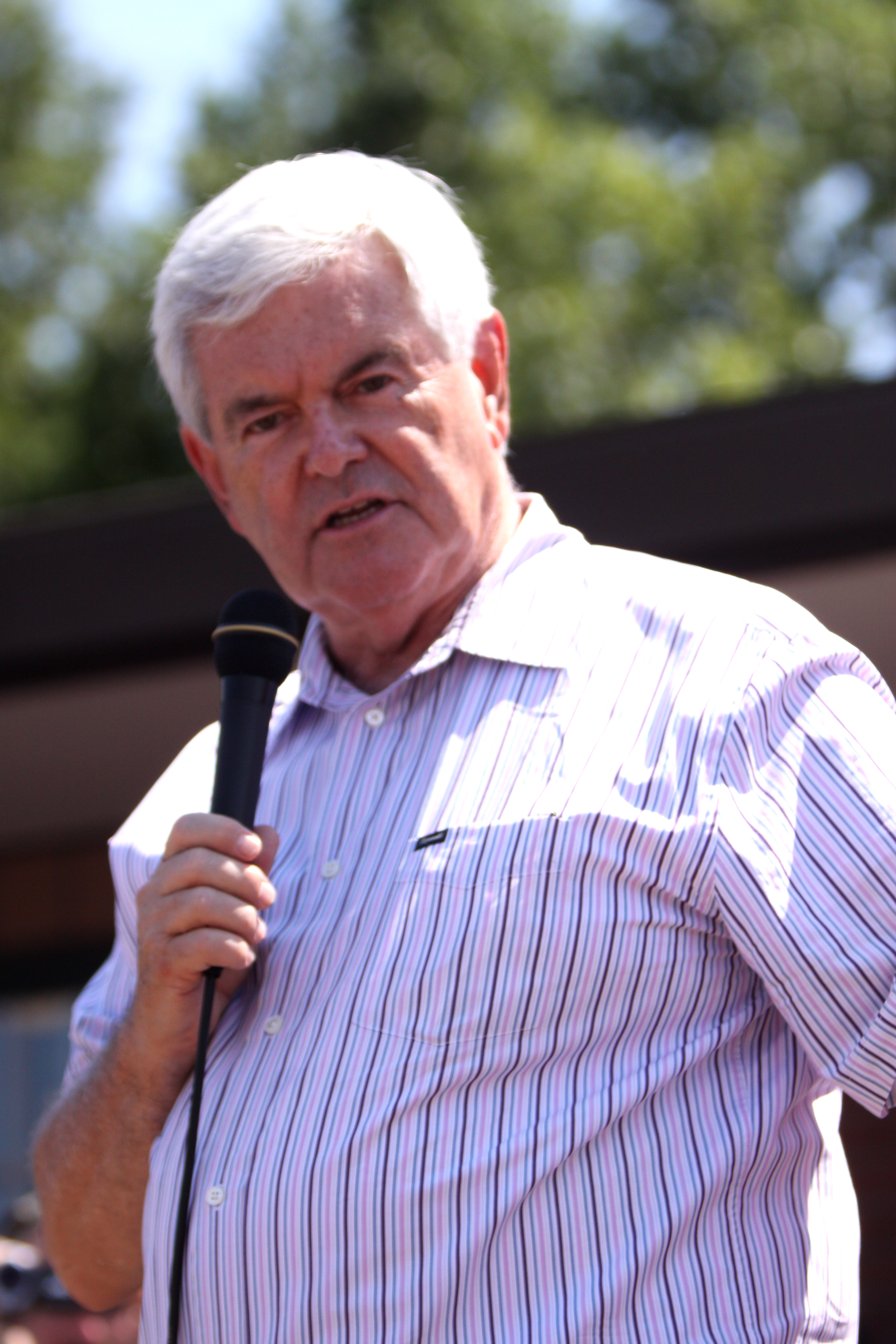
Newt Gingrich speaking to voters in Des Moines, Iowa

Gingrich was first elected to Congress in 1978, and served as Speaker of the House after helping to orchestrate the 1994 Republican Revolution in part with the Contract With America. He stepped down as Speaker and resigned from the House in 1999. Since then, he has published several historical novels and served as a political consultant and recently as a Fox News contributor. He was previously speculated as a candidate in the 2008 election, and has supported the Tea Party movement.

For most of 2010, Gingrich spent a considerable amount of time campaigning throughout the early primary states, particularly Iowa and New Hampshire. In 2011, he took part in the Conservative Political Action Conference, fueling further speculation of a potential run.

In March, speaking on the Christian Broadcasting Network about his past marital infidelity, he said he had made poor moral judgments and regretted that part of his past, for which he had sought God's forgiveness.

== 2011: campaign kick-off and developments ==
=== Announcement ===
Gingrich had maintained he would not officially decide whether or not to pursue the office of president until at least February 2011, and would announce his decision sometime in March. It was erroneously announced on May 1, 2011, that Gingrich had formed an exploratory committee, and officially announced the committee in Georgia after a meeting with Governor Nathan Deal. He actually launched an exploratory committee on May 3, when he started his new website.

The website, entitled "Newt Exploratory 2012", featured a photo of Gingrich with his wife, Callista, superimposed over a background of flag-waving Americans. The Getty Images-licensed background was found to have been previously used on the website of the late Senator Ted Kennedy of Massachusetts. He officially declared his run for president on May 11, 2011, through Twitter and YouTube, making him the first candidate in American history to do so.

=== Meet the Press interview ===
On May 15, 2011, Gingrich was interviewed by David Gregory on Meet the Press. Questioning Gingrich on the issue of entitlements, Gregory asked: "The Medicare trust fund, in stories that have come out over the weekend, is now going to be depleted by 2024, five years earlier than predicted. Do you think that Republicans ought to buck the public opposition and really move forward to completely change Medicare, turn it into a voucher program where you give seniors some premium support and—so that they can go out and buy private insurance?" Gingrich answered: "I don't think right-wing social engineering is any more desirable than left-wing social engineering. I don't think imposing radical change from the right or the left is a very good way for a free society to operate."

Perceived to be criticism of the Republican Party's plan to reform Medicare for the 2012 United States federal budget, the comments were met with backlash from the GOP and various political pundits. Sarah Palin, former Governor of Alaska and the 2008 Republican vice presidential nominee, defended the former Speaker of the House on the Fox News Channel show Hannity, stating Gingrich was a victim of gotcha journalism and that his apology was forced by the "lamestream media". Gingrich later said on CBS News's Face the Nation that he was not referring to Ryan but to a general principle "that neither party should impose on the American people something that they are deeply opposed to."

=== Staff resignations ===
On June 9, 2011, Gingrich's campaign manager, his press secretary, and senior aides in early primary states resigned en masse. One resigning aide, strategist Dave Carney, cited incompatibility between the candidate's vision of the campaign and that of the professional staff. The New York Times cited aides complaining of the influence of Gingrich's wife, Callista Gingrich, on the campaign, the candidate's unwillingness to devote more time to campaigning in early primary states, and recent spending on a chartered jet despite fundraising troubles. Fox News also reported that staff had argued with Gingrich over a luxury cruise in the Balkans, Greece and Turkey he took with his wife just before the resignations.

Two of the aides had previously worked for Rick Perry, who was launching his own presidential bid. Gingrich vowed on his Facebook page the same day to begin his campaign "anew". He compared himself to Ronald Reagan and John McCain, who experienced large staff resignations during their presidential runs.

=== Revival ===
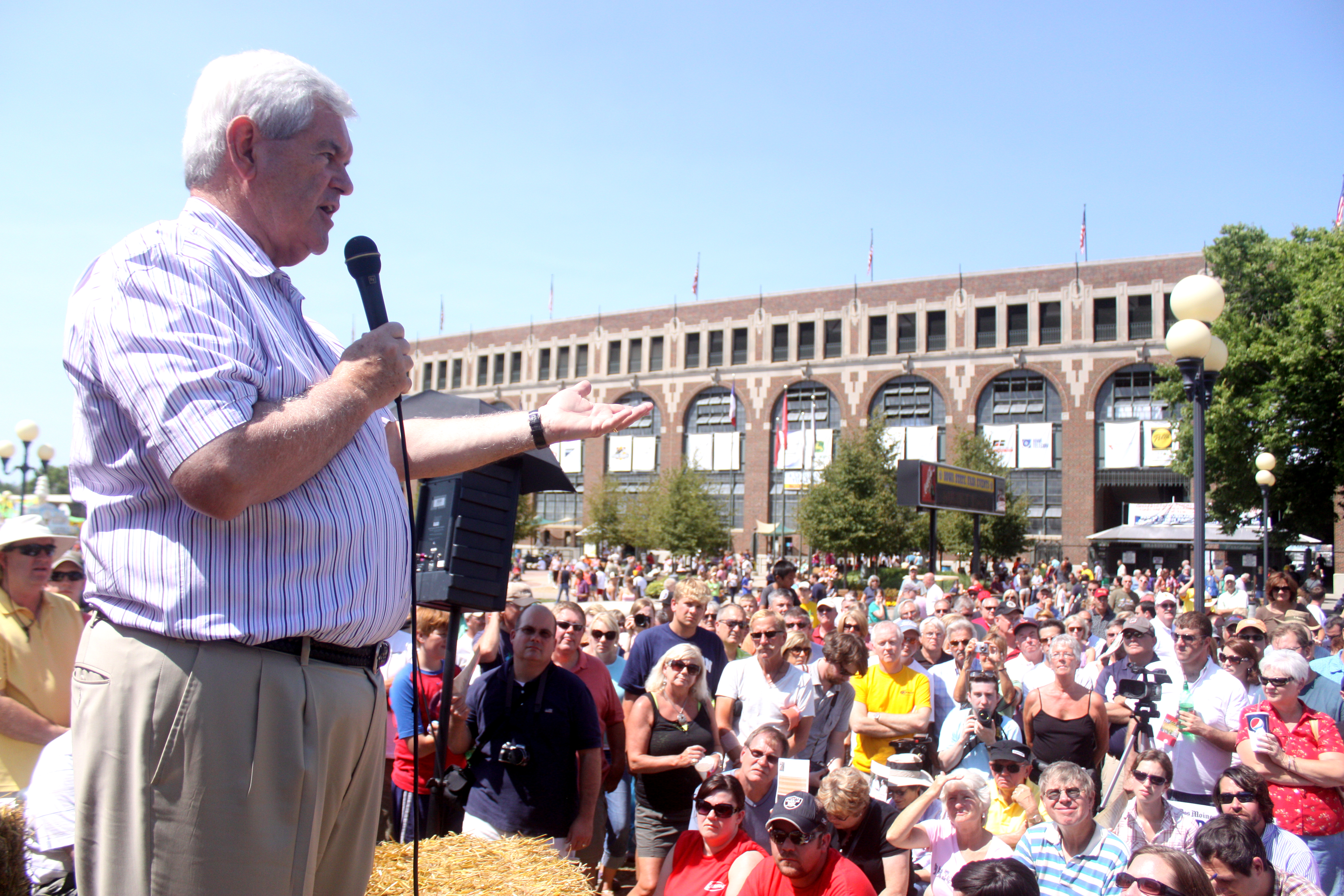
Gingrich at the Iowa State Fair in Des Moines, Iowa, ahead of the Ames Straw Poll.

Gingrich continued to campaign on a promise of restoring competitiveness to the United States, promising to eliminate the capital gains tax and slash corporate taxes. In August 2011, Gingrich called for the adoption of the Six Sigma business management model by the United States government, arguing that as much as half a trillion a year in waste could potentially be eliminated.

Gingrich began taking commercial flights and recruited professional volunteers to save money. By July 2011, he announced he had raised $2 million in the previous 3 months and was on-track to paying back his campaign debts. Gingrich said the hardest aspect of his campaign was fundraising, and stated that potential donors had been deterred by earlier media stories that he was not a serious candidate.

He told guests at a fund-raising dinner, "It's September and I'm here. Every day that goes by we're fund-raising. We will be on the road 24 days this month. I will be in 50 states. This campaign is fully underway." On the campaign trail, a former Republican Party chairman described him as "a wellspring of ideas" and an independent voter said his study of history was a "good credential".

Gingrich approached his political campaign based on a model from Walmart and McDonald's, saying that instead of carving a niche for himself from among his fellow Republican contenders, he would court nontraditional interest groups for the GOP, including Asian Americans and Latinos.

Reporters characterized him as "wonkish" and "unconventional" in his approach to campaigning; he spent hours discussing brain disorders such as Alzheimer's and autism with scientists, for instance, and spoke with voters on the importance of investing in brain science research. Gingrich was one of several candidates, including Mitt Romney, who did not contest the 2011 Ames Straw Poll. Gingrich did not purchase a booth or speaking slot at the Ames poll, and made no serious effort to win the Ames poll. He finished 8th out of 10 candidates listed.

Gingrich put effort into his Internet social networking, and developed a strong following on Facebook and Twitter. He also held a handful of video "hangouts" where he would have webcam discussions with potential voters. Politico found his Twitter account impressive, and wrote a positive article on how his Twitter account had developed to 1.3 million followers from its start in 2009. Gingrich posted 2 or 3 tweets per day, and included science and history in addition to political topics.

An anonymous former member of Gingrich's campaign staff said about 80% of the followers were inactive or invalid accounts, and that the campaign paid an Internet service to add followers. Gingrich's spokesman rejected the allegations as false and said his inclusion in the Suggested User List was "responsible for a large, but indeterminable amount of followers". ABC News identified two other "suggested" users, Gavin Newsom with 1.3 million, and John McCain with 1.7 million followers, suggesting it was not an anomaly.

=== Debates and polling ===
The Washington Post reported Gingrich had a "solid performance" at the fifth Republican debate in Tampa, Florida. A CNN/ORC International poll released shortly after the sixth Republican debate in Orlando, Florida had Gingrich in third behind Perry and Romney.

Gingrich increased his fundraising after consistently performing well in the Republican debates. Pollster Kellyanne Conway, who worked for Gingrich's American Solutions, reviewed his debate performances and said his focus and ability to stay on-point during the discussions helped him enormously, as compared to past speeches where he would entertain many different topics. In September 2011, he was able to increase his ground operations in Iowa, South Carolina, and New Hampshire. Tea Party founder Judson Phillips endorsed him, praising his "presidential" appearances at the debates.

Gingrich personally was in-favor of having unmoderated debates and advocated for a series of Lincoln-Douglas style forums, which he believed would produce a better "adult Conversation with the American people." He explained, "It's difficult to get past the elite media's passion for trivia. It's difficult to deal with presidential debates that say, in 30 seconds, 'What's your position on balancing the budget?' You know, I don't think we're geared, outside maybe of C-SPAN, to the kind of conversations that we really need in order for the country to make decisions that are really very fundamental."

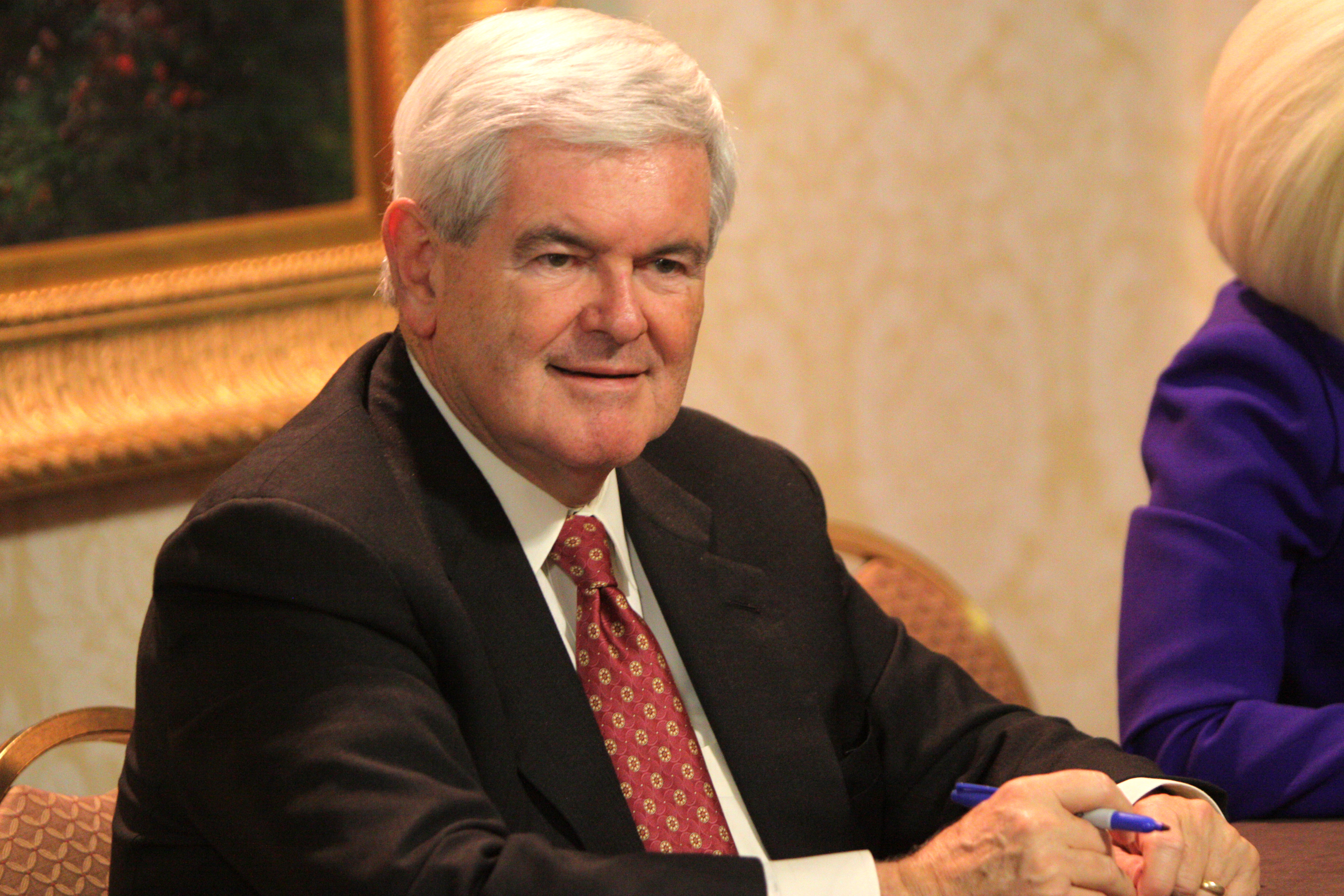
Gingrich during a book signing in November 2011.

=== New "Contract with America" ===
Gingrich introduced a new "Contract with America" that he said would be "much bigger and much bolder" than his original 1994 Contract. Among his proposals would be a Balanced Budget Amendment, a strong training program for new hires in his administration, an individualized learning program for American students, and the signing of 50–100 executive orders beginning on his first day as president.

Mr. Gingrich proposed the building of a fence on the U.S.-Mexican border by January 1, 2014, telling a Tea Party audience it was long overdue, "We won the entire second World War in 44 months, and now in 25 years we can't control the border when the entire Texas side of the border is a river."

He emphasized the balance of powers between the executive, judicial, and legislative branches, and proposed an elimination of policy czars and the reduction of power for the judiciary. Gingrich said the United States faced "an increasingly arrogant judiciary" and said that the Federalist Papers had established the judiciary as the "weakest of the three branches". Gingrich promoted a reduction in the size of the federal government, pushing for the states' rights authorized by the 10th Amendment.

Certain federal agencies, including the Department of Education, the Environmental Protection Agency, and the Department of Homeland Security would be reduced or eliminated, and federal programs such as student loans would be done by private companies instead of the government. He believes the EPA should be eliminated and replaced by a smaller agency which would be more aggressive in getting companies to use new science and technology to help the environment.

He opposed carbon pricing, which was especially unpopular among conservatives, saying it was an overreach of the EPA's authority. He said the EPA, which was founded in 1970 by Richard Nixon, a Republican, began on good conservative principles but has become too bureaucratic and litigation-focused to be successfully innovative. In particular, he is an advocate for nuclear power, and wants government regulations rewritten from an "outdated" model based on large complex nuclear plants so they take into consideration the systems inside smaller nuclear power plants.

=== Developments, November–December 2011 ===
Gingrich speech on November 18, 2011, interrupted by protestors from Occupy Boston and Occupy Harvard who accuse Gingrich of siding with corporations over people

By November 2011, Gingrich had moved ahead of Rick Perry in the polls, behind Mitt Romney and Herman Cain who were both contending for the lead. On November 10, an independent PAC not bound by FEC donation limits, Solutions 2012, was launched to fill the fundraising gap that existed since Gingrich's 527 group, American Solutions, closed down in August.

At a debate, Gingrich was pressed about his past relationship with Freddie Mac, as his consulting firm was paid $300,000 by Freddie in 2006. Gingrich said he did no lobbying for Freddie Mac, which was then under scrutiny by the White House, Alan Greenspan, and some Congressional Republicans ahead of the subprime mortgage crisis. Gingrich said he was approached by Freddie and told, "we are now making loans to people that have no credit history and have no record of paying back anything, but that's what the government wants us to do," to which he replied, "This is insane." At the time, Freddie Mac had paid over 52 Congressmen as part of its Capitol Hill lobbying efforts. Gingrich's campaign conceded that Freddie Mac was interested in reaching out to more Republican lawmakers but said the contract terms precluded any lobbying.

Media investigations noted that Gingrich's relationship with Freddie Mac extended beyond 2006, with Bloomberg News revealing an earlier consulting contract that lasted from 1999 to 2002. It became apparent that Gingrich's consulting company had received $1.6 million from Freddie Mac.

Scrutiny of Gingrich's "inside the Beltway" ties continued with the Washington Post reporting on November 17 that the Center for Health Transformation, a private, for-profit think tank founded by Gingrich in 2003, made at least $37 million over 8 years by billing health care companies and industry groups who as members paid up to $200,000 annual fees. Although the Center denies lobbying, on its website the organization suggests that it can help clients bridge the link to government agencies and build a "network of allies" within the Federal and State governments.

In late November, Gingrich received the endorsement of the New Hampshire newspaper the Manchester Union Leader, which praised his "innovative, forward-looking strategy and positive leadership".

On December 1, Gingrich said confidently he would be the nominee, noting that recent polling had him surging in the early states of Iowa, South Carolina, and Florida, as well as closing on Mitt Romney in New Hampshire. A November 2011 CNN article by Democratic strategist Paul Begala was headlined Newt Gingrich Would Be a Godsend to the Democrats, and Iowa Senator Tom Harkin (Democrat) said in December that a Gingrich nomination would be "heaven-sent" for President Obama's election campaign. Polling among likely Republicans found Gingrich ranked just as capable as Mitt Romney to defeat Obama, and received higher levels of enthusiasm from men, evangelical Christians, and conservatives, while Romney received more support from those who labeled themselves as moderates. Gingrich said Romney was a "competent man" and said he was considering Romney as a possible running mate.

As Herman Cain's campaign stumbled in November, Gingrich began polling at the top of the Republican field and received solid leads in early states, establishing himself as a frontrunner with serious opposition coming only from Mitt Romney. Romney's campaign attempted to paint Gingrich as "unstable" and "inconsistent", and bought TV ads in Iowa and New Hampshire against Gingrich.

After Romney suggested that Gingrich give back the money he was paid by Freddie Mac, Gingrich responded: "I would just say that if Gov. Romney would like to give back all the money he's earned from bankrupting companies and laying off employees over his years at Bain, then I would be glad to listen to him and I'll bet you $10 dollars – not $10,000 – that he won't take the offer." This statement was criticised by conservative opinion leader Charles Krauthammer.

In late December, Gingrich picked up the endorsement of the most powerful Republican in New Hampshire, House Speaker Bill O'Brien, whose trip to Iowa to make the announcement underscored the national significance of the endorsement. After having already failed to file the paperwork required for inclusion on the ballot in Missouri before the deadline, the Gingrich campaign also failed to meet the requirements to appear on the ballot in Virginia, leaving the state to the only two candidates who met the requirements, Mitt Romney and Ron Paul. Political scientist Larry Sabato observed that the filing failure was "yet another signal to Republicans that Gingrich is not able to organize.". At this point Patrick Millsaps was hired as the deputy general counsel to assist with these ballot access issues and to bring some much needed structure to the struggling campaign.

=== Statements on Palestinians, Arab-Israeli conflict, Iran, North Korea ===
Gingrich stirred international attention for an interview he gave to The Jewish Channel on December 9, 2011, in which he said "Palestinians are an 'invented' people" who could have chosen to live elsewhere". The Palestinian Authority strongly disagreed with Gingrich's statements, which were common arguments among Zionist Jews in the early decades of Israel's existence, but have since been abandoned by mainstream Israelis. It is believed that Gingrich made this disparaging comment about the Palestinians in order to garner support from the influential pro-Israeli Republican, Sheldon Adelson.

The Republican field stated his statements might stir up trouble in a tumultuous region, but Gingrich stood firm by his comments, adding that Palestine never existed as a separate state and "Palestinians" did not gain common recognition until after 1977. Gingrich also took a hard line against Palestine's government, saying both Hamas and Fatah were intricately linked terrorist organizations and shared hostility towards the Jewish people.

Although Gingrich supports a two-state solution to the Arab–Israeli conflict, Palestinians found his statements to be insensitive and insulting. An advisor to the Palestine Liberation Organization (PLO) suggested that Gingrich's information on the subject was obtained from "one-sided Israeli propaganda" published in the Palestinian Media Watch.

Gingrich's fears of a possible electromagnetic pulse attack in the United States received more media attention. In 2004, Gingrich had advocated that the United States create defense systems and carry out pre-emptive military strikes to prevent such a threat in front of the United States House of Representatives. In 2009, he gave a speech to AIPAC proposing attacks on Iranian and North Korean nuclear sites to prevent a possible nuclear disruption attack. The scientific community has been divided on the potential effects of such an attack, and there is skepticism as to how relevant the threat is in the post-Cold War era.

=== "Establishment" opposition ===
Gingrich parodied on the cover of National Review

Gingrich's rise to front-runner status provoked renewed skepticism from the party establishment and heavy scrutiny from conservative pundits, who questioned his character and his record. David Brooks argued that Gingrich is subject to "narcissism, self-righteousness, self-indulgence and intemperance" while George Will called him a "rental politician" who "embodies almost everything disagreeable about modern Washington." Peggy Noonan expressed concern that after winning the nomination in 2012 "and the GOP is fully behind him, he will begin baying at the moon."

A National Review magazine cover showing Gingrich as Marvin the Martian pokes fun at his support for U.S.-built moon bases. The magazine urged its readers not to vote for Gingrich, calling attention to his past marriages, his "irresolute action" as speaker, and his absence from government since 1998. In the last few weeks before the Iowa caucuses, established Republican politicians came publicly for Romney and became more vocal against Gingrich, arguing that he was not as "electable" in a general election as Romney. Gingrich received such criticisms from Peter T. King and Nikki Haley, and from pundits Glenn Beck, George Will, Charles Krauthammer, Brit Hume, and Jonah Goldberg. Responding to the criticism, Gingrich said "[t]he Republican establishment is anti-intellectual and anti-change. They're for winning as long as it's meaningless."

=== Campaign Restructuring ===
On the evening of March 27, 2012, the Gingrich campaign announced it was cutting a third of the staff and replacing campaign manager Michael Krull with his deputy, Vince Haley. Patrick Millsaps remained as the Chief of Staff. The campaign also said Gingrich would have more exposure on the Internet, and that his travel costs would be reduced. Strategic goals would be to present Gingrich as the most capable prospective adversary to President Obama, and to go after delegates in anticipation of a brokered convention.

The previous day, Sheldon Adelson had said Gingrich appeared to be "at the end of the line" because "mathematically, he can't get anywhere near the numbers, and it's unlikely to be a brokered convention."

== 2012 primaries ==
=== Iowa: 4th place, 13% ===
On January 3, Gingrich won 13 percent of the vote in the Iowa Republican caucuses, finishing fourth behind Rick Santorum, Mitt Romney, and Ron Paul. Gingrich blamed negative advertising for his decline in December polling, saying "anybody who has eight or nine million dollars of negative advertising, much of it false, thrown at them is going to slide for a while." When asked if he felt he had been swiftboated, a reference to the negative ads that partially derailed John Kerry's presidential bid in 2004, Gingrich replied that he'd been "Romney-boated". The San Francisco Chronicle noted that a PAC supporting Romney launched "more than $1.2 million of negative ads in Iowa, mostly aimed at Gingrich", the content of which included "at least one false statement and several misleading ones". Writing in Politico, Vanderbilt University political science professor John Geer agreed that there was "an unprecedented number of negative ads aired against" Gingrich in December, but argued that the ads were not the sole explanation for Gingrich's decline in support, since the decline was national while the ads were airing only in Iowa. In Geer's view, Gingrich's problem was "the bright lights of the news media", writing that during the summer and early fall "many voters ... focused on his much-praised performance in the GOP debates ... Once Gingrich became a credible candidate, however, the media began to scrutinize him more carefully".

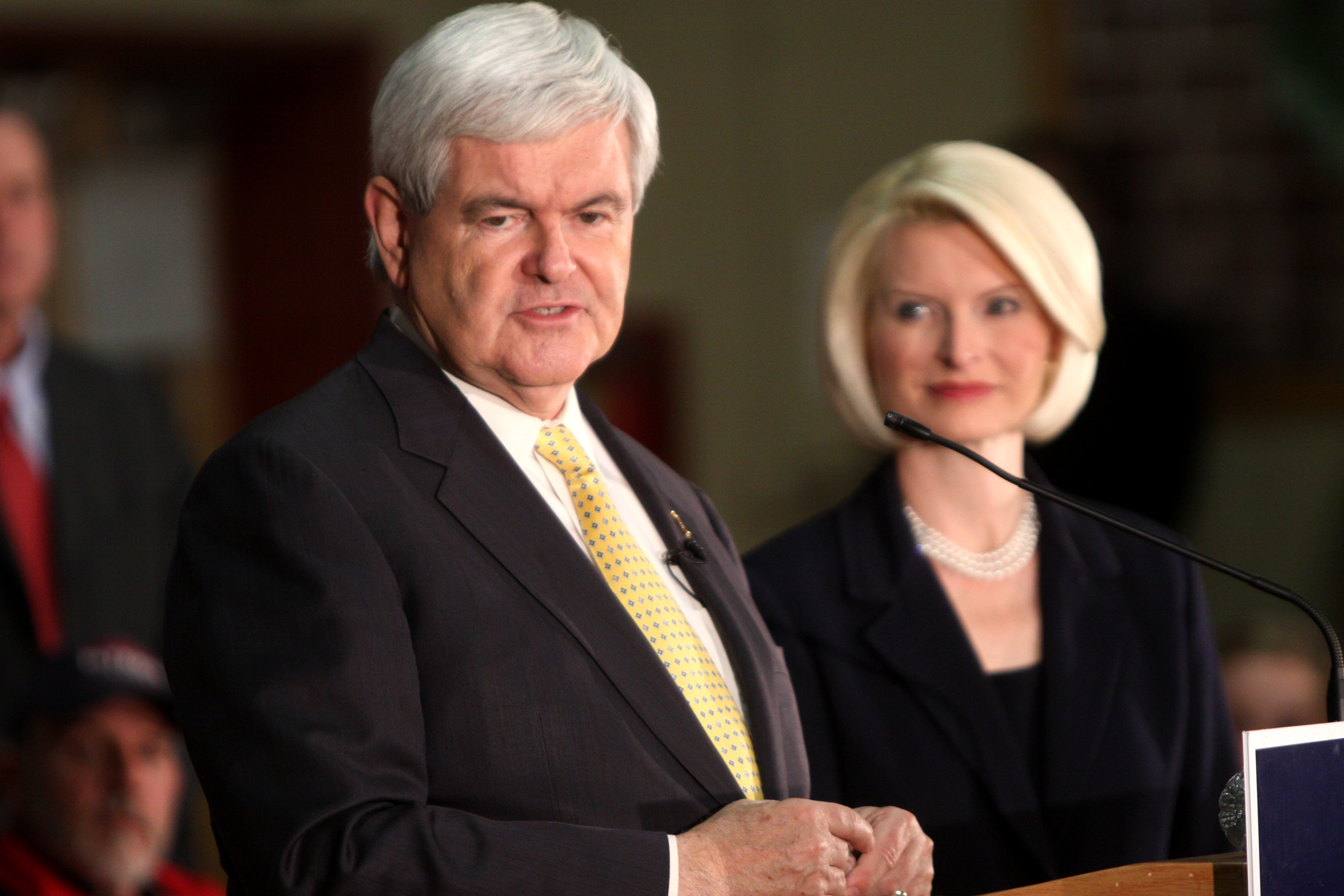
Gingrich and his wife in New Hampshire

Following release of the Iowa results, Gingrich gave a concession speech, in which he appeared angry at "a Massachusetts moderate" for his campaign's attack ads.

=== New Hampshire: 5th place, 9.4% ===
Following the Iowa caucuses, Gingrich flew to New Hampshire to take part in two debates the weekend prior to that state's January 10 primary. Romney won the primary with 39 percent of the vote while Gingrich finished in fifth place with 9.4 percent, just 11 votes behind Rick Santorum, who finished fourth.

=== South Carolina: 1st place, 40% ===
Ahead of the South Carolina primary, casino magnate Sheldon Adelson donated $5 million to "Winning Our Future", the Super PAC that supports Gingrich. The super PAC allocated $3.4 million for TV advertising in South Carolina, including the trailer for a 27-minute documentary titled "When Mitt Romney Came to Town" that purported to tell the tale of a "predatory corporate raider". This line of attack drew disapproval from some Republican leaders and pundits. After the Washington Post's "Fact Checker" gave the film their most damning rating of "4 Pinocchios", Gingrich called on the PAC to "either edit every single mistake or pull the entire film". A Reuters/Ipsos poll announced a week before the primary showed Gingrich slipping behind the front runner.

Former Alaska Governor Sarah Palin urged voters to vote for Gingrich on January 18, and the next day Texas Governor Rick Perry dropped out of the race and endorsed Gingrich, describing the former House Speaker as a "conservative visionary".

On January 21, Gingrich outpolled Romney 40% to 27%, with Rich Galen, a Republican strategist and former Gingrich aide observing that, "Newt [just] had one of the best weeks in politics I've ever seen and Romney had one of the worst." Two TV debates held during the week played a decisive factor. Washington Post analyst Chris Cillizza dubbed Gingrich's January 16 encounter "the former House Speaker's best debate of the entire race". GOP viewers were put off by Romney's business-like replies and won over by Gingrich's fire in the belly remarks. After Representative Jim Clyburn (D-SC) accused Gingrich of having engaged in racial dog whistling in South Carolina, Gingrich said "it's unfortunate that liberal leaders... can't have an honest debate about policies that fail."

Gingrich's victory in South Carolina, but ultimate inability to grab the nomination broke the state's long standing traditional status as being a primary bellwether for Republicans.

=== Florida: 2nd place, 32% ===
Polls released eight days before Florida's January 31 winner-take-all primary suggested that Gingrich was leading Romney in Florida and in a close race nationally. The super PAC supporting Gingrich bought $6 million of air time in Florida, having received an additional contribution of $5 million from Miram Adelson, Sheldon Adelson's wife. The PAC produced another documentary that attacked Romney, this time making an issue of Romney's 1990 to 1993 tenure as a corporate director of Damon Corporation, a medical testing company that paid $119 million in criminal fines and a civil settlement in 1996 for defrauding Medicare. As of January 27, Romney's campaign and super PAC had outspent Gingrich forces by nearly $12 million, with Wesleyan University's "Media Project" calculating that Romney and his interest group allies had aired almost 13,000 ads on Florida broadcast TV as of January 25, versus 200 for Gingrich's campaign and allies.The Guardian said that before the primary, Gingrich had been "subjected to one of the most expensive and sustained negative ad bombardments in recent US political history," and Gingrich said some of the attacks on him had been "breathtakingly dishonest."

As Gingrich excoriated "elites in Washington and New York", Canadian columnist Andrew Steele noted that the former House Speaker was running a campaign of "classic populism".

On January 25, Gingrich made waves by declaring that "by the end of [his] second term, [America] will have the first permanent base on the moon". He mentioned that just as Abraham Lincoln, the Wright Brothers, and John F. Kennedy were grandiose, he too was grandiose, and that it was not a negative quality as Mitt Romney had suggested. Former NASA senior adviser Charles Miller praised the announcement, calling the proposal "possible" and "necessary".

Gingrich continued to face opposition from "establishment" Republicans. 1996 GOP presidential candidate Bob Dole announced that "it is now time" to take a stand against Gingrich. Former Reagan official Elliott Abrams accused the then Georgia Congressman of having been a Reagan critic in the 1980s, although some commentators took issue with Abrams' allegations, noting that Gingrich had frequently praised Reagan.

Gingrich had his 19th debate of the campaign in Jacksonville on January 26. Washington Post columnist Jennifer Rubin reckoned that it was a good debate for Gingrich's rivals, describing Romney as "invigorated", and Santorum as "impressive". Rich Lowry of the National Review agreed, noting that at one point "Gingrich tried to wheel on [debate moderator] Wolf Blitzer and [this time] it didn't work."

A Quinnipiac poll released four days before the primary found Gingrich trailing Romney by 9%, a margin similar to that found by several other polls. An American Research Group poll conducted on January 27 and 28 found that he was tied with Romney among male voters, but was more than 20 points behind Romney with female voters. Several polls announced just before the vote suggested that Romney would win Florida by a double-digit margin.

On January 31, Romney won with 46% to Gingrich's 32%. Rick Santorum took 13% while Ron Paul, who did not campaign in Florida, received 7%. Gingrich managed to win most of North Florida, but the more populous central and southern counties such as Pinellas, Orange, Broward and Miami-Dade turned out largely in Romney's favor. Gingrich declined to make "the traditional congratulatory phone call" to Romney.

Also on January 31, the Gingrich campaign acknowledged responsibility for a Florida robocall that accused Romney of "forcing Holocaust survivors to eat non-kosher food" while he was Governor of Massachusetts. Gingrich aide Joe DeSantis said it had not gone through the campaign's "normal vetting process", and that calls on the topic would not be repeated in Nevada. The Romney campaign said the calls were "sad" and "desperate". Gingrich denied knowledge of the calls.

=== February ===
Following reports that his Nevada campaign was in disarray, in the February 4 caucuses Gingrich polled 21% to Romney's winning 50%, followed by Paul with 19% and Santorum with 10%. Mineral County was the only county won by Gingrich in that contest. Gingrich vowed to continue his campaign after this second place Nevada finish, but failed to place better than a distant third in any of the three states holding votes on February 8. Gingrich had failed to get on the initial Missouri ballot, with his justification being that it was a "beauty contest", with delegates being awarded later. Colorado, Minnesota, and Missouri were all won by Rick Santorum. As of February 6, Gingrich had 32 of the 1144 delegates needed to win the Republican Primary race. Gingrich received 6% of the votes announced on February 11 concerning the Maine caucuses. Mitt Romney won with 39%. Ron Paul was second in Maine with 36%, and Rick Santorum third (18%). Neither Gingrich nor Santorum campaigned in the New England state.

On February 13, National Review's editors said Gingrich should drop out and endorse Santorum if he wanted to stop Romney. Gingrich noted that there had been calls for him to drop out in the past but he had subsequently bounced back in the polls.

Beginning in February 2012, Gingrich promoted Patrick Millsaps to chief of staff and the two developed a message that began to emphasize Gingrich's proposal for American energy independence as a major theme of his campaign, in response to the rising price of gasoline nationwide. In a video posted by the campaign on February 18, he pledged to reduce gas prices to between $2 and $2.50 a gallon if he is elected. On February 19, 2011, in an appearance on Fox News Sunday, Gingrich was critical of the Obama administration's energy policies and accused the president of being "anti-American energy". Following a speech on energy policy by President Obama on February 23, 2012, Gingrich criticized the president's embrace of algae biofuel, and at California's Republican Convention he spoke at length on the topic of energy, rebutting the proposals put forward by Obama.

Gingrich came fourth in the February 28 Michigan primary, with 6.5% to Romney's winning 41.1%, Santorum's 37.9%, and Paul's 11.6%.

Romney won Arizona on February 28 with 46.9%, followed by Santorum with 27.0%, Gingrich with 16.0% and Paul at 8.6%.

=== March ===
A dropped legal challenge to the Virginia ballot controversy finally put its 49 delegates out of Gingrich's reach. Gingrich focused his campaign on Southern Super Tuesday states such as Georgia, Oklahoma and Tennessee as Rick Santorum continued to make gains in the polls of the latter two. Although Gingrich won Georgia on Super Tuesday, March 6, Gingrich's relative lack of support outside the South led some pundits to deem Alabama's and Mississippi's March 13 primaries as "must wins". Gingrich won 80 delegates out of 419 or 19% of the total awarded that night.

- Alaska – fourth place with 14.2% (2 delegates)
- Georgia – first place with 47.2% (54 delegates)
- Idaho – fourth place with 2.1% (0 delegates)
- Massachusetts – fourth place with 4.6% (0 delegates)
- North Dakota – fourth place with 8.5% (2 delegates)
- Ohio – third place with 14.6% (0 delegates)
- Oklahoma – third place with 27.5% (13 delegates)
- Tennessee – third place with 23.9% (9 delegates)
- Virginia – failed to make the ballot (0 delegates)
- Vermont – fourth place with 8.2% (0 delegates)

Gingrich failed to beat Santorum in Alabama and Mississippi, but was a close second and at that time indicated that he would not be withdrawing from the race.

In the Puerto Rico primary Gingrich came in third on March 18. Romney scored an "overwhelming win", landing more than 50 percent of the vote and all 20 delegates. Second was Santorum, with Paul fourth. The votes left Gingrich with a total of 136 delegates. Romney had 521; Santorum, 253; and Paul, 50. 1,144 are needed to win the nomination.

In the Illinois primary on March 20, Romney won 46.7% of the votes in a lighter than expected turnout. Gingrich received 8% of the votes cast for Republican presidential candidates. Santorum received 35% and Ron Paul finished third with 9.3%.

In the Louisiana Primary on March 24, Gingrich finished a distant third behind Santorum and Romney. Gingrich announced that as a result of the disappointing showing in Louisiana, he would be reducing his campaign's budget in order to avoid having to drop out of the race.

=== April ===
On April 3, Gingrich placed 3rd in the District of Columbia Primary, 3rd in Maryland, and 4th in Wisconsin.

On April 10, Santorum suspended his campaign, and Gingrich, claiming that he was the "last true conservative" still in the race, announced that he was relocating all his resources and time to Delaware, believing that a win there on April 24 would be a game-changer and would lead him on a path to prevent Romney from clinching the nomination during the primary season. However, on April 19, he told Republicans in New York that he would work to help Romney win the general election if Romney secured the nomination.

On April 24, Gingrich placed third in Connecticut, Rhode Island, and New York, fourth in Pennsylvania, and a distant second in Delaware.

On April 25, it was reported that Gingrich would suspend his presidential campaign on Tuesday, May 1, and endorse Romney.

=== May ===
On May 2, with around $4 million in campaign debt, Newt Gingrich officially withdrew from the 2012 presidential campaign and endorsed front-runner Mitt Romney.

== Endorsements ==
List of Newt Gingrich endorsements

Gingrich has received endorsements from: United States House of Representatives

- Representative Joe Barton of Texas, Chairman Emeritus of the House Energy and Commerce Committee
- Representative Michael Burgess of Texas
- Representative Phil Gingrey of Georgia
- Representative Jack Kingston of Georgia
- Representative Tom Price of Georgia
- Representative Austin Scott of Georgia
- Representative Lynn Westmoreland of Georgia
- Representative Andy Harris of Maryland
- Representative Trent Franks of Arizona
- Representative David Rivera of Florida

Governors and State Constitutional officers

- Governor, former presidential candidate Rick Perry of Texas
- Governor Nathan Deal of Georgia
- Georgia Insurance Commissioner Ralph Hudgens
- Georgia Public Service Commissioner Stan Wise
- Georgia Public Service Commissioner Lauren "Bubba" McDonald

Former officeholders

- Former Senator, former presidential candidate and actor Fred Thompson of Tennessee
- Former Senator Bob Smith of New Hampshire
- Former Senator and Governor Zell Miller of Georgia
- Former Representative Bob Barr of Georgia
- Former Representative Fred Grandy of Iowa
- Former Representative Greg Ganske of Iowa
- Former Representative J. C. Watts of Oklahoma
- Former Representative John Napier of South Carolina
- Former Representative, former Attorney General Bill McCollum of Florida
- Former Representative from New York Gary A. Lee of Florida
- Former Governor Sarah Palin of Alaska
- Former Governor Sonny Perdue of Georgia
- Former Lieutenant Governor André Bauer of South Carolina

Former diplomats, board members and other officials

- Former United States Treasurer Rosario Marin
- Former Ambassador to Tanzania, former Commerce Secretary of South Carolina Bob Royall
- Former member of President Ronald Reagan's Economic Policy Advisory Board Arthur Laffer
- Former Director of White House speechwriting for President Ronald Reagan Bently Elliott
- Former chief judge of the United States Court of Appeals for the Fourth Circuit, partner at the Nexsen Pruet law firm, Billy Wilkins
- Former member of the board of visitors at the Medical University of South Carolina Debra Wilkins

Current and former state and local officials and party officeholders

Florida

- Former Miami Mayor Joe Carollo
- Former Orange County Mayor Rich Crotty
- Vice Mayor of Bradenton and Bradenton City Councillor Patrick Roff
- State Senator Jim Norman
- State Senator Thad Altman
- Former State Senator John Grant Sr.
- State Representative Michael Bileca
- State Representative Gayle Harrell
- State Representative Deborah Mayfield
- State Representative Carlos Trujillo
- Former State Representative Kurt Kelley
- Former State Representative Monica Rodriguez
- Former State Representative Luis Rojas
- Brevard County Chair William Tolley
- Hillsborough County Chair Sam Rashid
- Honorary Brevard County Chair Coy Clark
- Duval County Co-chair Bert Ralston
- Pinellas County Co-chair Dr. Miguel Fana
- Jacksonville City Councillor Ray Holt
- Brooksville City Councillor Kevin Hohn
- Former Chairman of Calhoun County Commission Dan Wyrick
- Miami-Dade County Commissioner Xavier Suarez
- Palm Beach County Commissioner Steve Abrams
- Former Leon County Commissioner Ed Depuy
- Gingrich Florida Chair College Republicans Nathan Meloon
- Gingrich Florida Chair of Young Republicans Christian Waugh

Georgia

- Former State Senator Chuck Clay
- Former State Senator Bart Ladd
- Former State Senator Barry Loudermilk
- Former State Senator John Wiles
- State Senator John Albers
- State Senator Steve Gooch
- State Senator Judson Hill
- State Senator Rick Jeffares
- State Senator Jack Murphy
- State Senator Butch Miller
- State Senator William "Bill" Jackson
- State Senator Tommie Williams
- State Representative, chairman of the House Ethics Committee Joe Wilkinson
- State Representative, chairman of the Cherokee County legislative delegation Sean Jerguson
- State Representative Sharon Cooper
- State Representative Brooks Coleman
- State Representative Matt Dollar
- State Representative Harry Geisinger
- State Representative Paulette Braddock
- State Representative Matt Hatchett
- State Representative Buddy Harden
- State Representative Brett Harrell
- State Representative Jason Spencer
- State Representative Ron Stephens
- State Representative Roger Williams
- Hall County Commissioner Ashley Bell
- Hall County Commissioner Craig Lutz
- Hall County Commissioner Tom Oliver

Iowa

- Speaker of the Iowa House of Representatives Kraig Paulsen
- Majority Leader of the Iowa House of Representatives Linda Upmeyer
- State Senator James Seymour
- State Senator Randy Feenstra
- State Senator Shawn Hamerlinck
- State Senator David Johnson
- Former State Senator Larry McKibben
- State Representative, Chairman of the House Appropriations Committee Scott Raecker
- State Representative Bob Hager
- State Representative Chris Hagenow
- State Representative Josh Byrnes
- State Representative Jeff Kaufmann
- Former Republican Party of Iowa Chairman Ray Hoffman

New Hampshire

- Speaker of the New Hampshire House of Representatives William O'Brien
- State Representative William Panek
- State Representative Sam Cataldo
- State Representative Greg Sorg
- State Representative Donald Andolina
- State Representative Charles Brosseau
- State Representative J.C. Daugherty
- State Representative Robert Elliott
- State Representative Gregory Hill
- State Representative Frank Kotowski
- State Representative Kathleen Lauer-Rago
- State Representative Joseph Pitre
- State Representative Frank Sapareto
- State Representative Ken Sheffert
- State Representative Laurie Pettengill
- State Representative Glen Hill
- State Representative Don McClarren
- State Representative Joe Osgood
- State Representative Brandon Giuda
- Former New Hampshire Republican Party Chairman Jack Kimball

South Carolina

- Speaker of the South Carolina House of Representatives Bobby Harrell
- State Senator Rick Quinn
- State Representative Peter McCoy

Academics and commentators

- Hoover Institution economist and columnist Thomas Sowell
- President of the Center for Security Policy Frank Gaffney

US Armed Forces

- Retired United States Marine Corps Major General, Medal of Honor recipient James E. Livingston
- Retired United States Army Colonel Michael D. Steele

Newspapers

- New Hampshire Union Leader
- The Tampa Tribune

Celebrities, political activists, and commentators

- Allen Olsen, Columbia Tea Party
- Tea Party Nation founder Judson Phillips
- Des Moines Tea Party founder Charlie Gruschow aka "Tea Party Charlie"
- Conservative Club of Des Moines and Des Moines Conservative Breakfast Club founder Darell Kearney
- Carl Paladino, 2010 New York gubernatorial Republican nominee and conservative activist
- Former Shreveport Mayoral and Caddo Parish Commissioner candidate, Tea Party and Young Conservative Activist and Pastor Parker G. Ward of Shreveport, Louisiana
- Former radio host and Republican strategist, son of former President Ronald Reagan, Michael Reagan
- Iowa radio talk-show host Steve Deace
- Former Iowa director for Herman Cain's presidential campaign Larry Tuel
- South Carolina Young Republicans liaison, daughter of Lee Atwater, Republican strategist and former Republican National Committee chairman during the administration of former President George H. W. Bush, Sally Atwater
- Christian researcher George Barna
- Retired founder of the American Family Association Don Wildmon
- Pastor Jim Garlow of Skyline Church in Southern California
- Todd Palin, husband of Sarah Palin and former First Spouse of Alaska
- Steve Beren, tea party activist and former congressional candidate
- Tim LaHaye, author of eschatological fiction
- Michael Youssef, founder and president of Leading The Way with Dr. Michael Youssef
- Former top South Carolina strategist for Jon Huntsman's presidential campaign, adviser to Ronald Reagan's 1980 presidential campaign Richard Quinn
- Martial artist and actor Chuck Norris
- Film director and actor Mel Gibson
- Former Godfather's Pizza CEO, radio host and former presidential candidate Herman Cain
- Sheldon Adelson, CEO of Las Vegas Sands
