= 2012 Alabama Republican presidential primary =

- March 13, 2012

50 delegates to Republican National Convention (47 pledged, 3 unpledged)
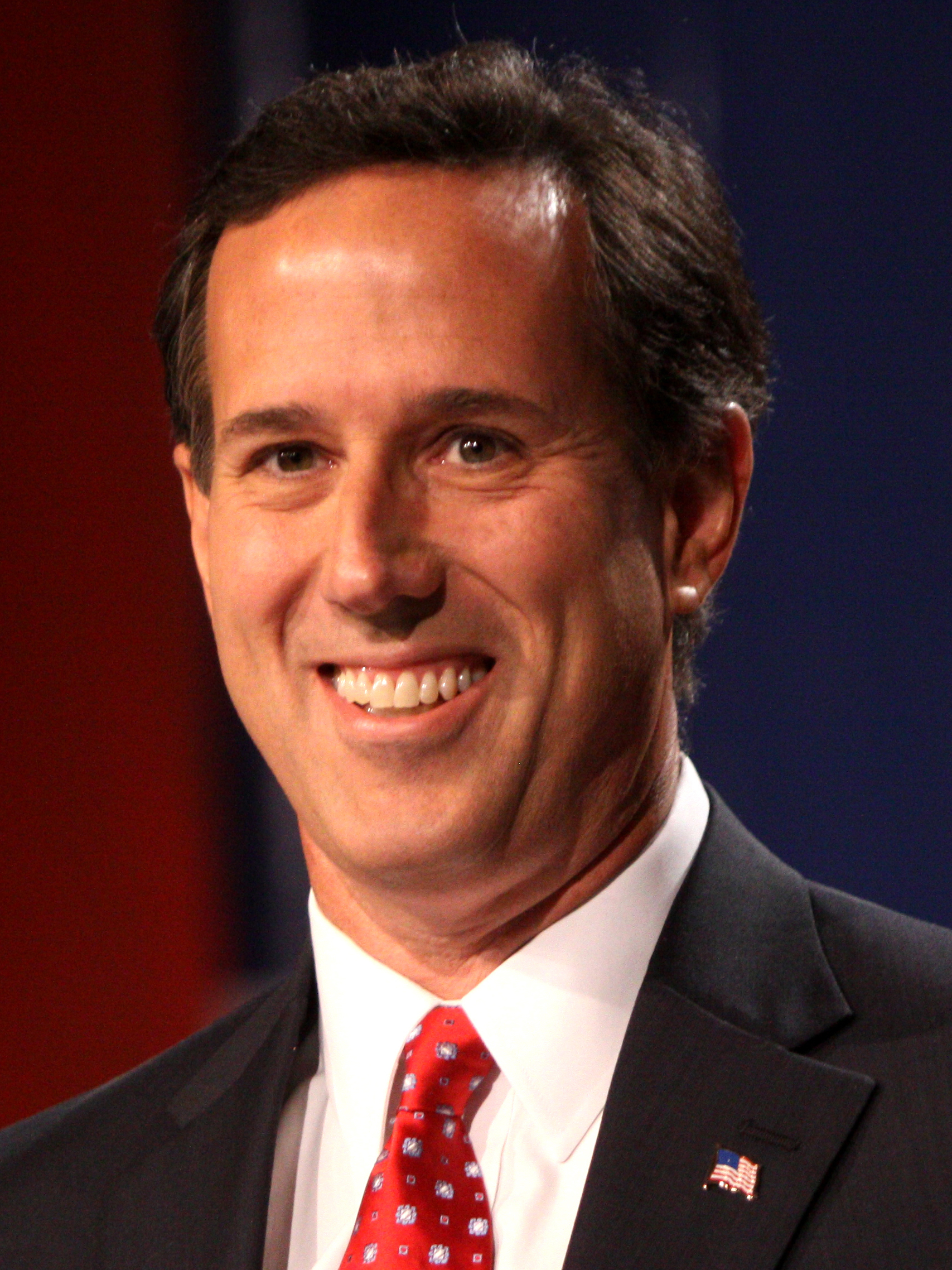

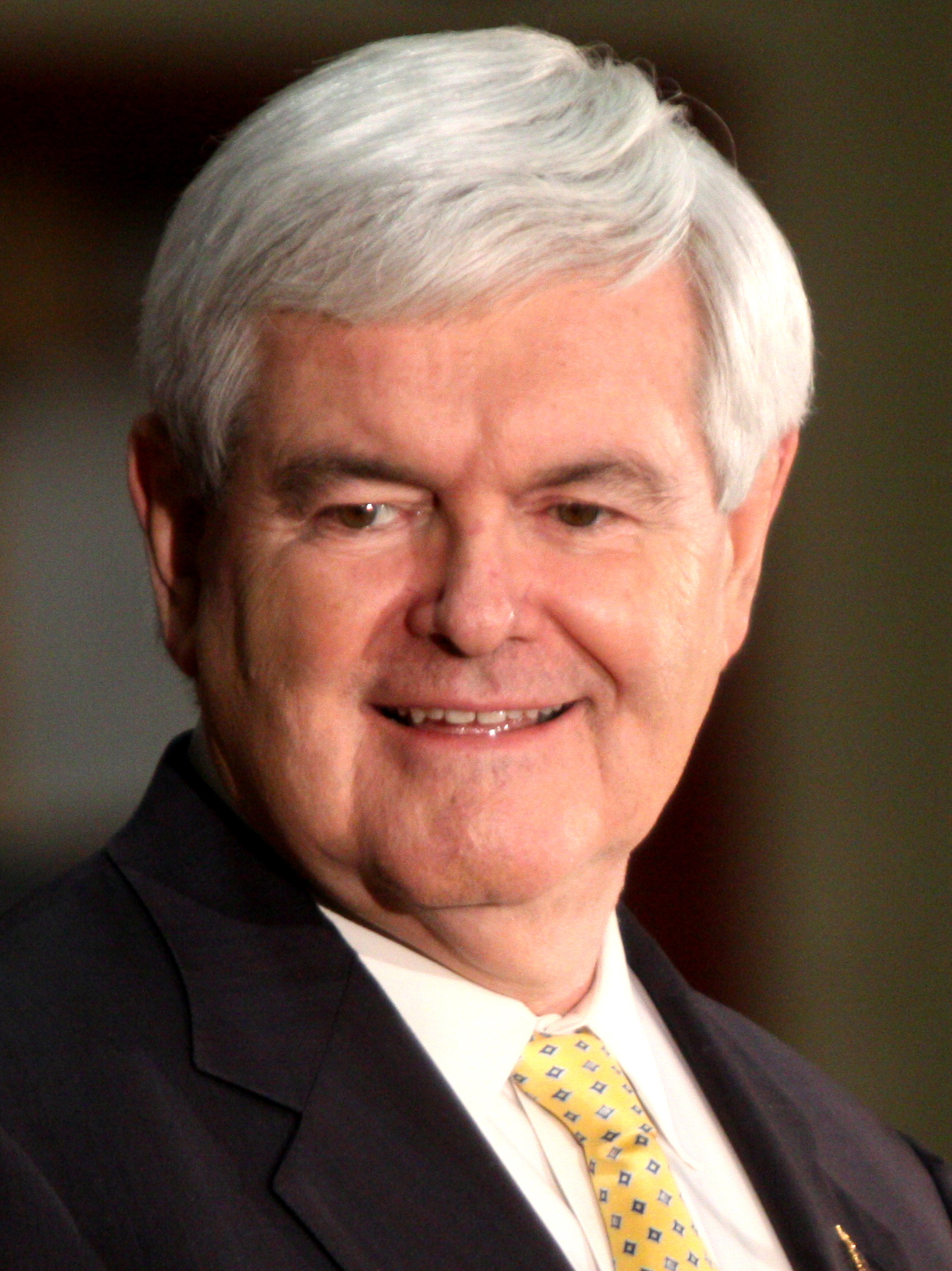

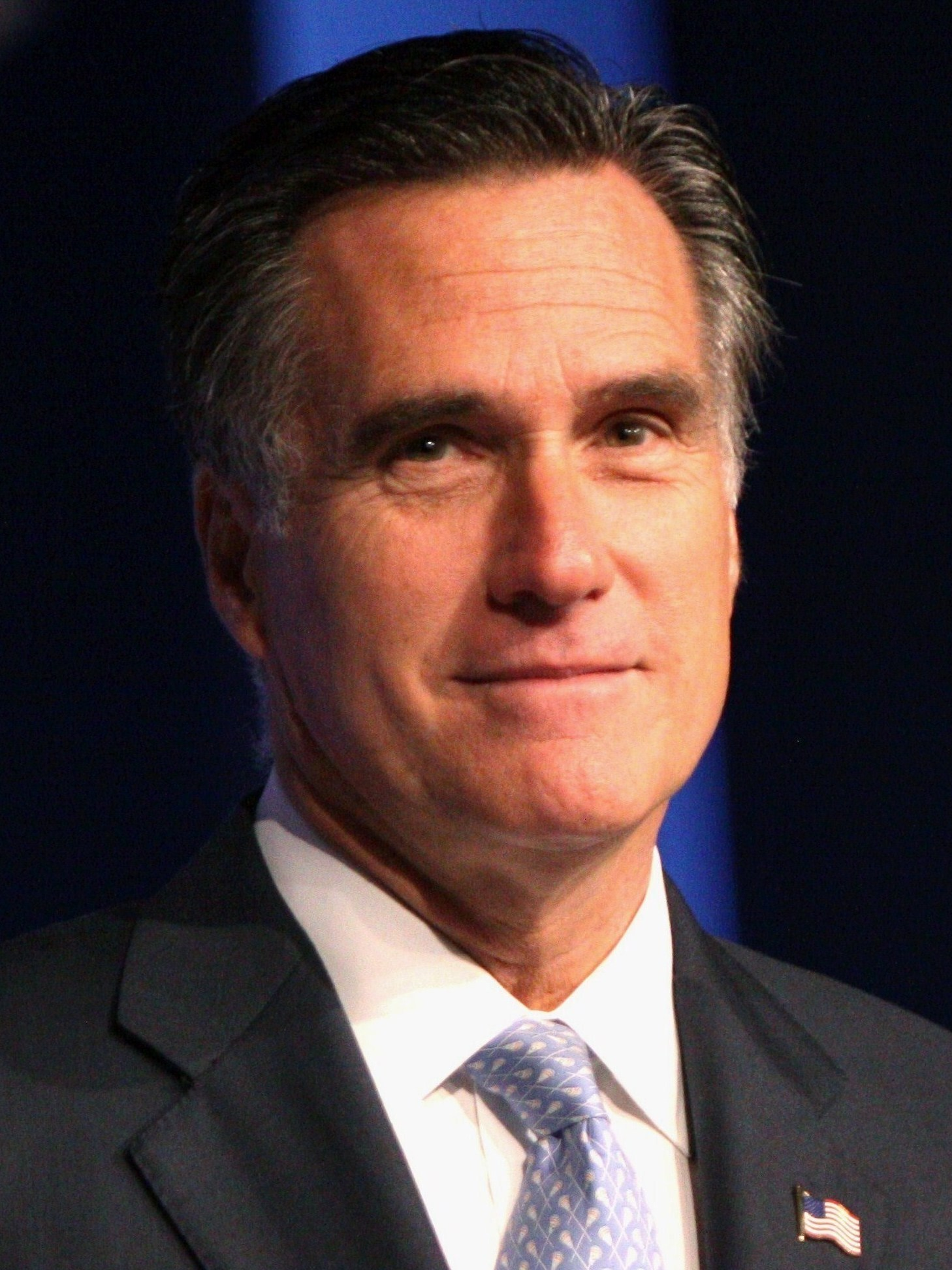

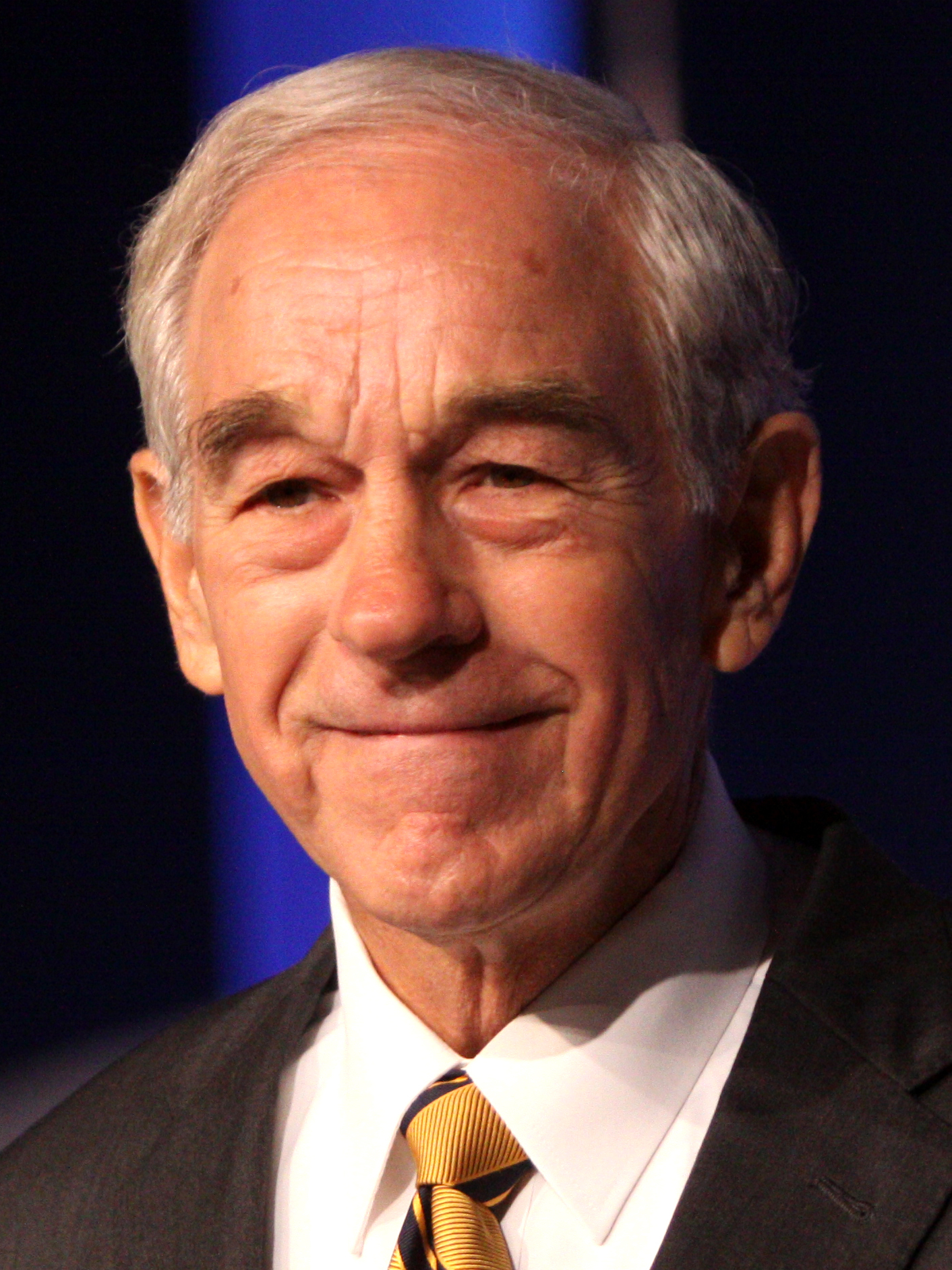
| Candidate | Rick Santorum | Newt Gingrich |
| Home state | Pennsylvania | Georgia |
| Delegate count | 17 | 12 |
| Popular vote | 215,105 | 182,276 |
| Percentage | 34.55% | 29.28% |
| Candidate | Mitt Romney | Ron Paul |
| Home state | Massachusetts | Texas |
| Delegate count | 10 | 0 |
| Popular vote | 180,321 | 30,937 |
| Percentage | 28.97% | 4.97% |
- Santorum: 30–40% 40–50% 50–60% Gingrich: 30–40% 40–50% Romney: 30–40% Tie: 20–30%

The 2012 Alabama Republican presidential primary took place on March 13, 2012, on the same day as the Mississippi Republican primary and the Hawaii Republican caucuses. Rick Santorum was declared the winner.

== Significance ==
The Alabama and Mississippi primaries were seen as a last possible point for the Newt Gingrich campaign to stay afloat in a primary season where he had only won two states up to that point; South Carolina in January and Georgia during Super Tuesday. Alabama and Mississippi were the keystones of his "Southern Strategy". Gingrich ignored other upcoming primaries to focus on campaigning in the two neighboring Gulf states.

== Results ==
2012 Alabama Republican presidential primary
| Candidate | Votes | Percentage | Projected delegate count | | |
| Candidate | Votes | Percentage | AP | CNN | FOX |
|---|---|---|---|---|---|
| Rick Santorum | 215,105 | 34.55% | 22 | 18 | - |
| Newt Gingrich | 182,276 | 29.28% | 14 | 9 | - |
| Mitt Romney | 180,321 | 28.97% | 11 | 9 | - |
| Ron Paul | 30,937 | 4.97% | 0 | 0 | - |
| Rick Perry (withdrawn) | 1,867 | 0.30% | 0 | 0 | - |
| Michele Bachmann (withdrawn) | 1,700 | 0.27% | 0 | 0 | - |
| Jon Huntsman (withdrawn) | 1,049 | 0.17% | 0 | 0 | - |
| Uncommitted | 9,259 | 1.49% | 0 | 0 | - |
| Unprojected delegates | | | 3 | 14 | 50 |
| Total: | 622,514 | 100.00% | 50 | 50 | 50 |

Santorum won most of the counties and thus five out of seven congressional districts, especially in the northern parts including Huntsville. Gingrich did the best in the southeast, winning its 2nd congressional district. Romney won in big cities such as Birmingham, Montgomery and Mobile. He was able to only win the Mobile metropolitan based 1st congressional district.

The results in Alabama, alongside those of Mississippi, effectively ended any remaining momentum for Gingrich's struggling campaign. Despite the second-place finishes in "must-win" states, Gingrich chose to stay in the race in hopes of facilitating a brokered convention.

== See also ==
- 2012 Republican Party presidential debates and forums
- 2012 Republican Party presidential primaries
- Results of the 2012 Republican Party presidential primaries
- Alabama Republican Party
