= R.C. Hammond =

American press secretary

- Born: 1979 (age 46–47); Moultonborough, New Hampshire
- Education: George Washington University, Wheaton College
- Occupation: Press Secretary
- Employer: Newt 2012, Inc.
- Political party: Republican

R.C. Hammond (born 1979) is an American political strategist and communications director. He served as a communications adviser for Secretary of State Rex Tillerson, and as the press secretary to Newt Gingrich's 2012 presidential campaign. He previously served Gingrich at his American Solutions for Winning the Future PAC. Hammond has worked as press secretary or communications director for Senator Gordon H. Smith, Senator John E. Sununu and Representative Shelley Moore Capito. He founded R. C. Hammond Public Affairs in 2012.

== Early life and education ==
Robert C. Hammond was born in Moultonborough, New Hampshire. He graduated from George Washington University in 2002 with a BA in political communication.

== Career ==
=== Early political career ===
For 10 years, Hammond served as a political aide to Republican members of Congress. He worked as press secretary or communications director for Senator Gordon H. Smith, Senator John E. Sununu and Representative Shelley Moore Capito. Hammond worked under Newt Gingrich at his American Solutions for Winning the Future PAC.

=== Gingrich 2012 presidential campaign ===
Hammond served as the press secretary and national spokesman for Newt Gingrich's 2012 presidential campaign. During the campaign, Hammond excluded national press from one of Gingrich's news conferences and refused to take questions from a Los Angeles Times reporter because of a story he had written. Following a campaign event in Alabama, Hammond threatened to withhold information from journalists if they wrote about Gingrich's unavailability to the press. Asked if he was withholding access if the press printed something he didn't want, he said "I've been doing that for the entire campaign."

During the campaign, Hammond received national media attention for his repeated confrontations with Utah Congressman Jason Chaffetz. Politico sarcastically referred to him as the "ever-lovable R.C. Hammond." The Los Angeles Times called Hammond a "political pit bull" and "sharp-tongued."

=== Consulting firms ===
Hammond founded his own public affairs, crisis and media relations consulting firm, R. C. Hammond Public Affairs, in 2012. He joined the public relations firm Hill+Knowlton Strategies in 2014 as Vice President. In July 2016, Hammond joined The Herald Group, a DC consulting firm, as Vice President.

=== Trump administration ===
Following the election of Donald Trump, Hammond was selected by the President-elect's transition team to guide then-Secretary of Defense nominee James Mattis through the Senate confirmation process.

Hammond served as a top communications adviser to Secretary of State Rex Tillerson and a spokesperson for the United States Department of State until December 2017.
