= Lissa Endriga =

American television host and model

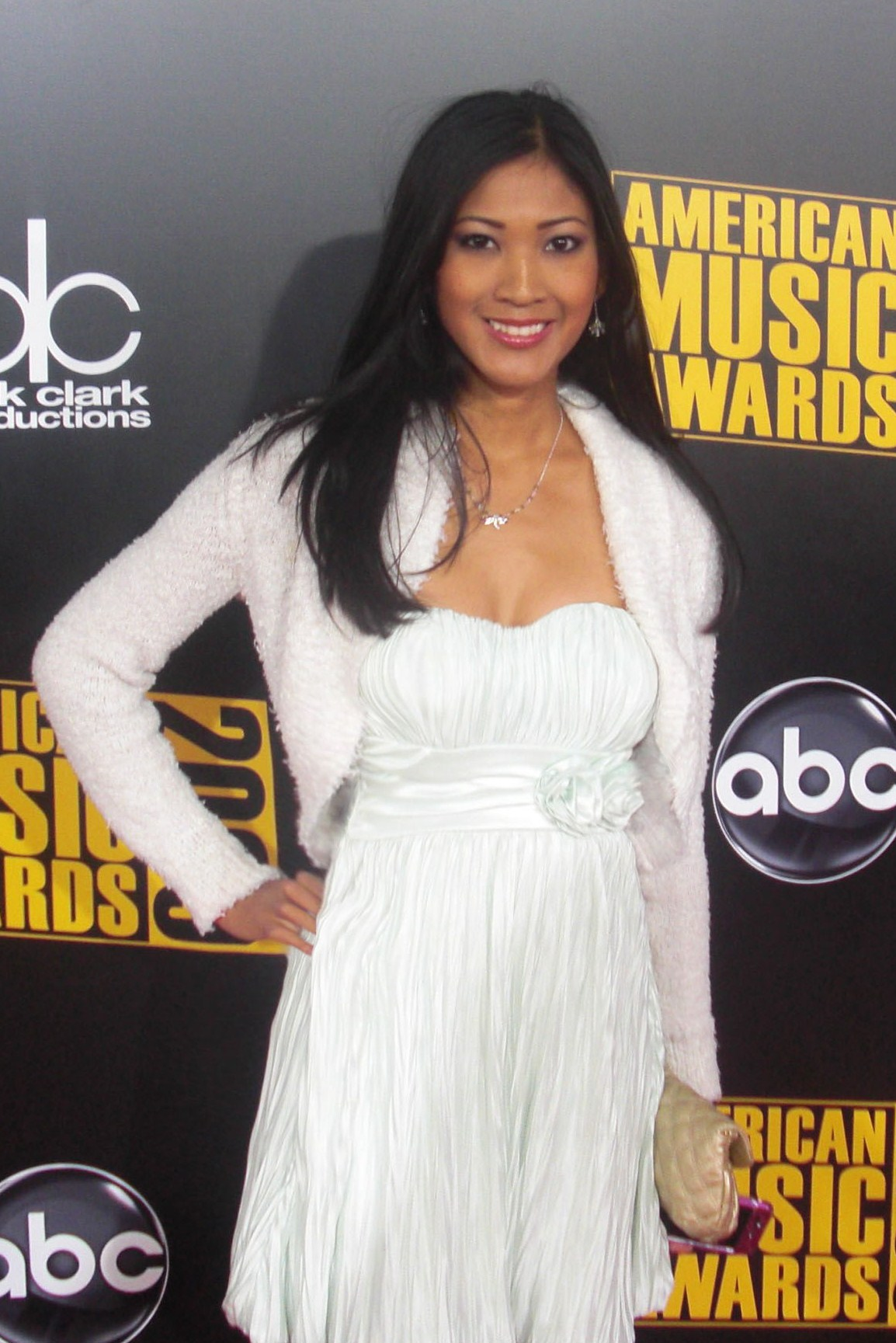
- Endriga at the American Music Awards
- Born: January 8, 1985 (age 41)
- Education: University of Southern California
- Occupations: Model, Television personality
- Height: 5 ft 8 in (1.73 m)

Lissa Endriga is an American television host and model, best known for her work on the travel-adventure television show Destination X: California and Destination X: Adventures.

== Early life ==
Endriga was born on January 8, 1985, in Southern California and raised in Marietta, Georgia, where she graduated from John McEachern High School with academic honors. She began modeling during high School, when a scout recruited her during a teen pageant. She is related to the prominent Endriga family of the Philippines.

Although primarily focused on academics, she worked as a fashion model on and off, while attending the University of Southern California. During her last two years of completion, Endriga decided to distance herself from modeling altogether, shifting her focus onto observing human behavior patterns. The results of her research on the relationship between obesity and the media surfaced and was recognized on CNN Health. Her appearance on the show caught the attention of executives, who later approached her with media opportunities.

== Career ==
As a model, she has been featured in several modeling and commercial campaigns including Samsung, Mazda, Circuit City Stores, BF Goodrich Tires, Karla G, Ed Hardy, Nike Shoes, Project 2011, Kawasaki, PlayStation and different products internationally.

She gained exposure and popularity in 2009 as one of four models during Super Bowl XLIII.

In 2009, Endriga was recruited to host Destination X, a travel show that features models completing extreme athletic challenges in exotic locations. The show airs worldwide in over 66 countries and in the United States on DirecTV, Dish Network, and various cable TV systems nationwide.

== Personal ==
In addition to being an active TV host/model, Endriga is one of the original artists for Feed-A-Model, a Los Angeles-based art and philanthropy group that sells art to raise money for charities. She is also the founder of Phil-A-Heart, an organization dedicated to help orphans and charity-funded schools in Asia. Endriga has a graduate degree in Psychology and is currently pursuing a doctorate.

== Additional appearances ==
Date	Appearance
February 2011	Presented "Best Male Performer" & "Online Winners" for pre-Grammy's awards show, eWorld Music Awards
January 2011	French entertainment TV expose, featured model and commentator, shown in all French speaking countries
September 2009	Appears on Book Cover of "I'm Having More Fun than You" (by Aaron Karo)
February 2009	Super Bowl XLIII Model, Winner of Football throwing challenge (on NFL Network)
