= 2012 United States presidential election in Mississippi =

- November 6, 2012

Nominee	Mitt Romney	Barack Obama
Party	Republican	Democratic
Home state	Massachusetts	Illinois
Running mate	Paul Ryan	Joe Biden
Electoral vote	6	0
Popular vote	710,746	562,949
Percentage	55.29%	43.79%

Romney
40–50%
50–60%
60–70%
70–80%
80–90%
Obama
40–50%
50–60%
60–70%
70–80%
80–90%
President before election
Barack Obama
Democratic
Elected President
Barack Obama
Democratic

The 2012 United States presidential election in Mississippi took place on November 6, 2012, as part of the 2012 general election in which all 50 states plus the District of Columbia participated. Mississippi voters chose six electors to represent them in the Electoral College via a popular vote pitting incumbent Democratic President Barack Obama and his running mate, Vice President Joe Biden, against Republican challenger and former Massachusetts Governor Mitt Romney and his running mate, Congressman Paul Ryan.

Romney and Ryan won Mississippi with 55.29% of the popular vote to Obama and Biden's 43.79%, thus winning the state's six electoral votes by an 11.50% margin. Mississippi was one of just six states where Obama improved on his 2008 performance. According to exit polls, the black vote share in Mississippi increased from 33% in 2008 to 36% in 2012, likely explaining Obama's gains.

This was the strongest showing for a Democratic presidential candidate in Mississippi since native Southerner Bill Clinton's 44.08% in 1996. Obama carried Warren County, becoming the first Democrat to do so since John F. Kennedy in 1960. He also managed to flip Benton County and improved his margins in Democratic counties throughout the state. As of the 2024 presidential election, this was the last time a Democratic presidential candidate has carried Benton, Chickasaw, and Panola counties. Obama's 562,949 votes is the highest total received by a Democratic presidential candidate in the state's history.

== Primary elections ==
=== Democratic primary ===
Incumbent President Obama ran unopposed in the Mississippi primary and therefore received 100% of the vote.

=== Republican primary ===
Mississippi Republican primary, 2012
- March 13, 2012

37 Republican National Convention delegates The number of delegates received is determined by the popular vote
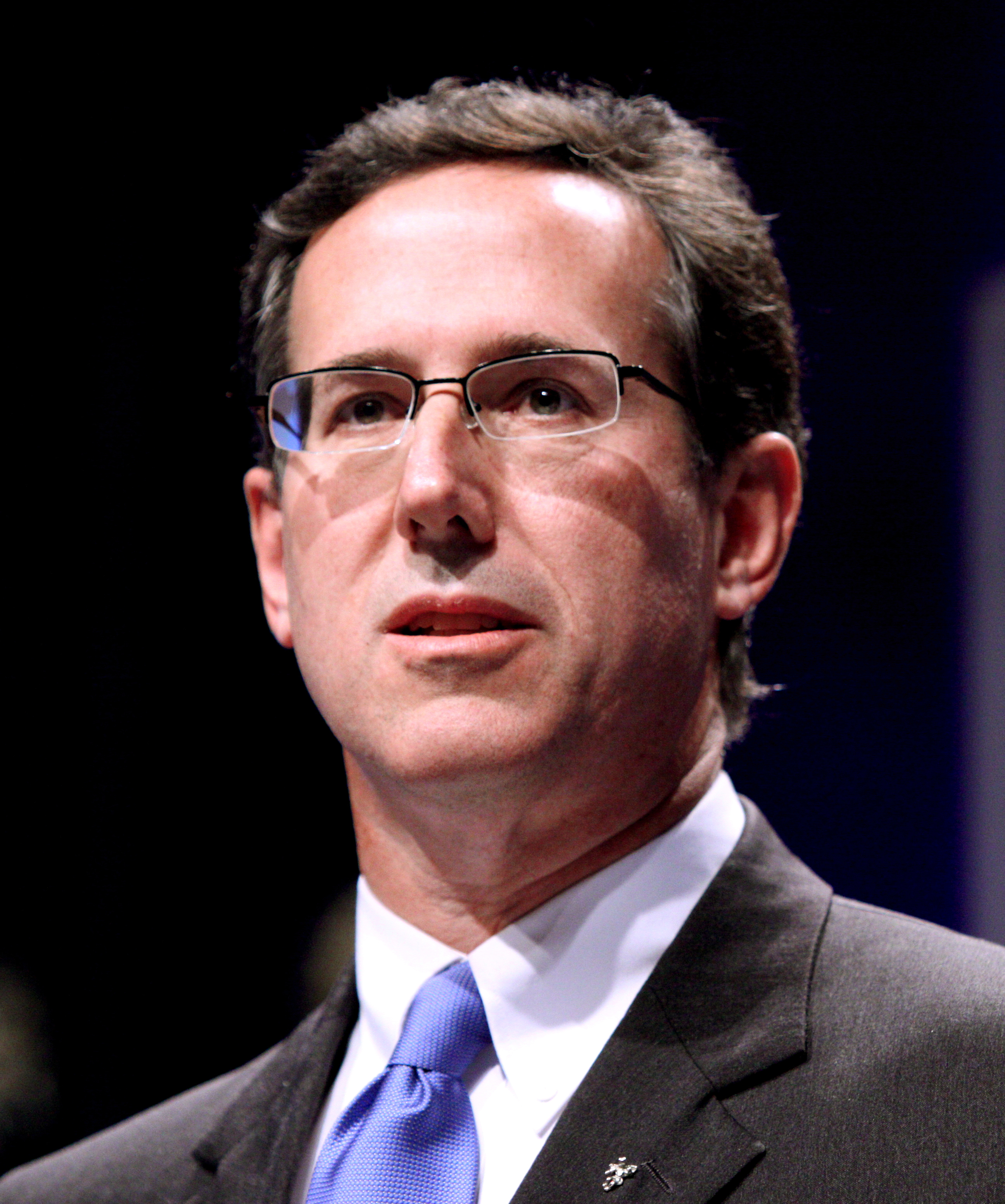

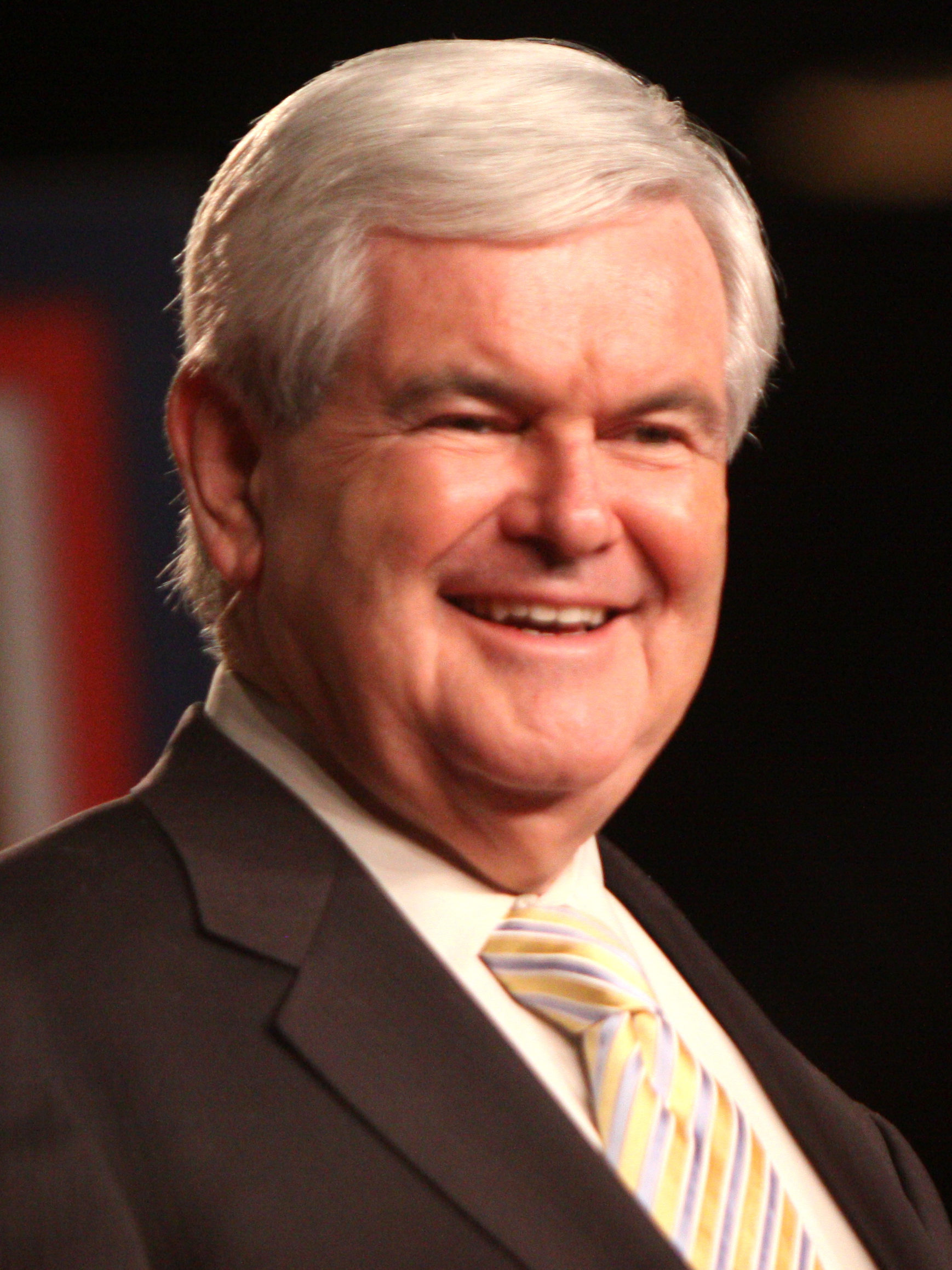

Candidate	Rick Santorum	Newt Gingrich	Mitt Romney
Home state	Pennsylvania	Georgia	Massachusetts
Delegate count	13	12	12
Popular vote	96,258	91,612	90,161
Percentage	32.73%	31.15%	30.66%
County results
Santorum
30–40%
40–50%
Gingrich
30–40%
40–50%
Romney
30–40%
40–50%
Tie
30–40%

The Republican primary took place on March 13, 2012, the same day as the Alabama Republican primary and the Hawaii Republican caucuses. After the open election, 37 bound delegates and three unbound delegates will go to the Republican National Convention.

Mississippi Republican primary, 2012
Candidate	Votes	Percentage	Delegates
Rick Santorum	96,258	32.73%	13
Newt Gingrich	91,612	31.15%	12
Mitt Romney	90,161	30.66%	14
Ron Paul	12,955	4.40%	0
Rick Perry	1,350	0.46%	0
Michele Bachmann	971	0.33%	0
Jon Huntsman, Jr.	413	0.14%	0
Gary Johnson	392	0.13%	0
Unprojected delegates:			3
Total:	294,112	100%	40

== General election ==
=== Predictions ===
Source	Ranking	As of
Huffington Post	Safe R	November 6, 2012
CNN	Safe R	November 6, 2012
New York Times	Safe R	November 6, 2012
Washington Post	Safe R	November 6, 2012
RealClearPolitics	Solid R	November 6, 2012
Sabato's Crystal Ball	Solid R	November 5, 2012
FiveThirtyEight	Solid R	November 6, 2012

=== Results ===
2012 United States presidential election in Mississippi
Party	Candidate	Votes	%	±%
Republican	Mitt Romney Paul Ryan	710,746	55.29%	−0.89%
Democratic	Barack Obama Joe Biden	562,949	43.79%	+0.79%
Libertarian	Gary Johnson Jim Gray	6,676	0.52%	+0.32%
Constitution	Virgil Goode Jim Clymer	2,609	0.20%	−
Green	Jill Stein Cheri Honkala	1,588	0.12%	+0.04%
Reform	Barbara Dale Washer Cathy L. Toole	1,016	0.08%	+0.04%
Total votes		1,285,584	100.00%	N/A

==== By county ====
County	Mitt Romney Republican		Barack Obama Democratic		Various candidates Other parties		Margin		Total
County	#	%	#	%	#	%	#	%	Total
Adams	6,293	40.74%	9,061	58.66%	93	0.60%	-2,768	-17.92%	15,447
Alcorn	11,111	74.92%	3,511	23.67%	208	1.40%	7,600	51.25%	14,830
Amite	4,414	57.28%	3,242	42.07%	50	0.65%	1,172	15.21%	7,706
Attala	5,126	56.38%	3,927	43.19%	39	0.43%	1,199	13.19%	9,092
Benton	2,041	49.59%	2,051	49.83%	24	0.58%	-10	-0.24%	4,116
Bolivar	4,701	30.47%	10,582	68.59%	145	0.94%	-5,881	-38.12%	15,428
Calhoun	4,412	62.42%	2,586	36.59%	70	0.99%	1,826	25.83%	7,068
Carroll	3,960	66.09%	2,007	33.49%	25	0.42%	1,953	32.59%	5,992
Chickasaw	3,994	46.97%	4,378	51.49%	131	1.54%	-384	-4.52%	8,503
Choctaw	2,812	65.81%	1,428	33.42%	33	0.77%	1,384	32.39%	4,273
Claiborne	625	11.40%	4,838	88.22%	21	0.38%	-4,213	-76.82%	5,484
Clarke	5,049	61.18%	3,111	37.70%	93	1.13%	1,938	23.48%	8,253
Clay	4,291	38.76%	6,712	60.62%	69	0.62%	-2,421	-21.87%	11,072
Coahoma	2,712	25.71%	7,792	73.86%	45	0.43%	-5,080	-48.16%	10,549
Copiah	6,282	44.48%	7,749	54.87%	92	0.65%	-1,467	-10.39%	14,123
Covington	5,405	57.82%	3,878	41.48%	65	0.70%	1,527	16.34%	9,348
DeSoto	43,559	66.21%	21,575	32.79%	660	1.00%	21,984	33.41%	65,794
Forrest	16,574	54.82%	13,272	43.89%	390	1.29%	3,302	10.92%	30,236
Franklin	2,735	60.87%	1,726	38.42%	32	0.71%	1,009	22.46%	4,493
George	8,376	84.98%	1,359	13.79%	121	1.23%	7,017	71.20%	9,856
Greene	4,531	76.51%	1,325	22.37%	66	1.11%	3,206	54.14%	5,922
Grenada	5,986	52.81%	5,288	46.65%	61	0.54%	698	6.16%	11,335
Hancock	12,964	75.52%	3,917	22.82%	286	1.67%	9,047	52.70%	17,167
Harrison	39,470	62.33%	23,119	36.51%	739	1.17%	16,351	25.82%	63,328
Hinds	29,664	27.86%	76,112	71.47%	715	0.67%	-46,448	-43.62%	106,491
Holmes	1,435	15.45%	7,812	84.11%	41	0.44%	-6,377	-68.66%	9,288
Humphreys	1,293	24.81%	3,903	74.88%	16	0.31%	-2,610	-50.08%	5,212
Issaquena	302	38.37%	479	60.86%	6	0.76%	-177	-22.49%	787
Itawamba	7,393	79.34%	1,706	18.31%	219	2.35%	5,687	61.03%	9,318
Jackson	35,747	66.62%	17,299	32.24%	609	1.14%	18,448	34.38%	53,655
Jasper	4,193	44.89%	5,097	54.57%	50	0.54%	-904	-9.68%	9,340
Jefferson	468	10.56%	3,951	89.13%	14	0.32%	-3,483	-78.57%	4,433
Jefferson Davis	2,507	36.52%	4,267	62.16%	90	1.31%	-1,760	-25.64%	6,864
Jones	20,687	68.59%	9,211	30.54%	261	0.87%	11,476	38.05%	30,159
Kemper	1,789	35.41%	3,239	64.11%	24	0.48%	-1,450	-28.70%	5,052
Lafayette	11,075	56.78%	8,091	41.48%	339	1.74%	2,984	15.30%	19,505
Lamar	19,101	76.74%	5,494	22.07%	294	1.18%	13,607	54.67%	24,889
Lauderdale	18,700	57.05%	13,814	42.15%	263	0.80%	4,886	14.91%	32,777
Lawrence	4,192	62.59%	2,468	36.85%	38	0.57%	1,724	25.74%	6,698
Leake	4,863	54.14%	4,079	45.41%	41	0.46%	784	8.73%	8,983
Lee	22,415	63.49%	12,563	35.58%	328	0.93%	9,852	27.90%	35,306
Leflore	3,587	28.08%	9,119	71.39%	67	0.52%	-5,532	-43.31%	12,773
Lincoln	10,839	66.04%	5,471	33.33%	104	0.63%	5,368	32.70%	16,414
Lowndes	13,518	49.78%	13,388	49.30%	252	0.93%	130	0.48%	27,158
Madison	28,507	57.51%	20,722	41.80%	342	0.69%	7,785	15.70%	49,571
Marion	8,237	64.71%	4,393	34.51%	99	0.78%	3,844	30.20%	12,729
Marshall	6,473	39.86%	9,650	59.42%	117	0.72%	-3,177	-19.56%	16,240
Monroe	9,723	57.47%	7,056	41.71%	139	0.82%	2,667	15.76%	16,918
Montgomery	2,947	52.21%	2,675	47.39%	23	0.41%	272	4.82%	5,645
Neshoba	7,837	71.15%	3,089	28.04%	89	0.81%	4,748	43.10%	11,015
Newton	6,394	65.40%	3,319	33.95%	64	0.65%	3,075	31.45%	9,777
Noxubee	1,325	21.15%	4,920	78.54%	19	0.30%	-3,595	-57.39%	6,264
Oktibbeha	8,761	48.36%	9,095	50.20%	261	1.44%	-334	-1.84%	18,117
Panola	7,629	45.34%	9,079	53.96%	118	0.70%	-1,450	-8.62%	16,826
Pearl River	17,549	78.96%	4,366	19.65%	309	1.39%	13,183	59.32%	22,224
Perry	4,137	72.30%	1,527	26.69%	58	1.01%	2,610	45.61%	5,722
Pike	8,181	45.52%	9,650	53.69%	143	0.80%	-1,469	-8.17%	17,974
Pontotoc	9,448	76.13%	2,804	22.59%	159	1.28%	6,644	53.53%	12,411
Prentiss	7,075	70.52%	2,817	28.08%	141	1.41%	4,258	42.44%	10,033
Quitman	1,116	28.05%	2,837	71.30%	26	0.65%	-1,721	-43.25%	3,979
Rankin	48,444	75.52%	14,988	23.37%	713	1.11%	33,456	52.16%	64,145
Scott	6,089	54.36%	5,031	44.91%	82	0.73%	1,058	9.44%	11,202
Sharkey	737	29.11%	1,782	70.38%	13	0.51%	-1,045	-41.27%	2,532
Simpson	7,424	60.61%	4,723	38.56%	102	0.83%	2,701	22.05%	12,249
Smith	6,049	74.69%	1,979	24.44%	71	0.88%	4,070	50.25%	8,099
Stone	5,420	71.96%	2,003	26.59%	109	1.45%	3,417	45.37%	7,532
Sunflower	2,929	26.09%	8,199	73.02%	100	0.89%	-5,270	-46.94%	11,228
Tallahatchie	2,499	38.43%	3,959	60.88%	45	0.69%	-1,460	-22.45%	6,503
Tate	7,332	59.10%	4,933	39.76%	141	1.14%	2,399	19.34%	12,406
Tippah	6,717	73.30%	2,317	25.28%	130	1.42%	4,400	48.01%	9,164
Tishomingo	6,133	77.28%	1,643	20.70%	160	2.02%	4,490	56.58%	7,936
Tunica	883	20.15%	3,475	79.30%	24	0.55%	-2,592	-59.15%	4,382
Union	8,498	74.77%	2,742	24.13%	125	1.10%	5,756	50.65%	11,365
Walthall	4,051	53.65%	3,422	45.32%	78	1.03%	629	8.33%	7,551
Warren	10,457	48.89%	10,786	50.42%	148	0.69%	-329	-1.54%	21,391
Washington	5,651	28.66%	13,981	70.92%	83	0.42%	-8,330	-42.25%	19,715
Wayne	6,111	59.15%	4,148	40.15%	73	0.71%	1,963	19.00%	10,332
Webster	3,992	76.27%	1,190	22.74%	52	0.99%	2,802	53.53%	5,234
Wilkinson	1,415	29.16%	3,412	70.31%	26	0.54%	-1,997	-41.15%	4,853
Winston	5,168	52.58%	4,607	46.87%	54	0.55%	561	5.71%	9,829
Yalobusha	3,276	51.56%	3,030	47.69%	48	0.76%	246	3.87%	6,354
Yazoo	4,941	42.52%	6,603	56.82%	76	0.65%	-1,662	-14.30%	11,620
Totals	710,746	55.29%	562,949	43.79%	11,889	0.92%	147,797	11.50%	1,285,584

Counties that flipped from Republican to Democratic

- Benton (largest town: Hickory Flat)
- Warren (largest city: Vicksburg)

==== By congressional district ====
Romney won three of four congressional districts.

District	Romney	Obama	Representative
1st	61.87%	37%	Alan Nunnelee
2nd	33%	66.4%	Bennie Thompson
3rd	60%	39.1%	Gregg Harper
4th	67.6%	31.24%	Steven Palazzo

== See also ==
- Republican Party presidential debates, 2012
- Republican Party presidential primaries, 2012
- Results of the 2012 Republican Party presidential primaries
- Mississippi Republican Party
