= Old Augusta Railroad =

Overview
- Headquarters: New Augusta, Mississippi
- Reporting mark: OAR
- Locale: Perry County, Mississippi
- Dates of operation: 1983–

Technical
- Track gauge: 4 ft 8 1/2 in (1,435 mm) standard gauge
- Length: 2.5 mi (4.0 km)

The Old Augusta Railroad (reporting mark OAR) is a 2.5-mile-long (4.0 km) shortline railroad that runs from the Georgia-Pacific Leaf River Cellulose pulp mill near the Old Augusta Historic Site in New Augusta, Mississippi to an interchange with the Canadian National Railway (CN) between Mahned, Mississippi and New Augusta. It primarily hauls pulp products, lumber, and paper products.

== History ==
The Old Augusta Railroad was constructed between August 1982 and early 1983. The Interstate Commerce Commission approved common carrier status for the railroad on February 23, 1983. The railroad was built by Leaf River Forest Products, Inc., which was owned by its parent company, Georgia-Pacific. When the railroad was initially built it interchanged with the Illinois Central Gulf Railroad prior to it being purchased by CN. The OAR connects to the CN Beaumont Subdivision, which runs between Mobile and Hattiesburg. In 2004, Georgia-Pacific sold the OAR to Koch Cellulose, LLC, which is owned by Koch Industries (the parent company of Georgia-Pacific). As part of the sale, OAR's name was changed to Old Pine Belt Railroad Company, which was a corporate shell that ceased operations on May 7, 2004. OAR, LLC was simultaneously created on May 7, 2004.

== Operations ==
In 1996, the OAR had a load of 10,000 cars per year with 195 boxcars.

== Motive power ==
In 1987, OAR used an EMD GP9.

In 1996, OAR used two locomotives to power its trains:

- 1 EMD NW2 (OAR 100)
- 1 EMD MP15 (OAR 200)
