= Perry County, Mississippi =

County in Mississippi, United States

- County
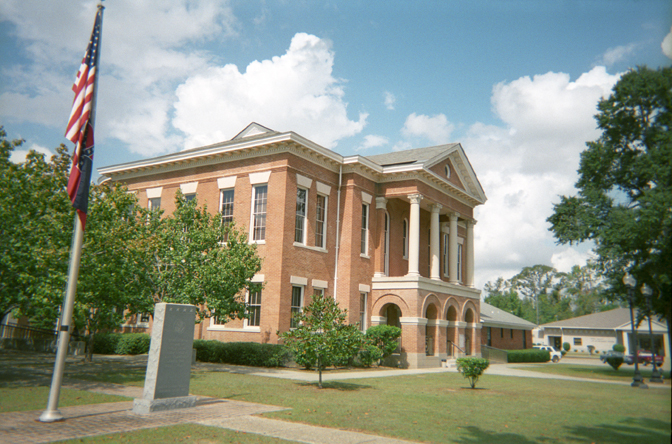
- Perry County Courthouse New Augusta

- Location within the U.S. state of Mississippi
- Coordinates: 31°10′N 88°59′W
- Country: United States
- State: Mississippi
- Founded: 1820
- Named for: Oliver Hazard Perry
- Seat: New Augusta
- Largest town: Richton

Area
  - Total: 650 sq mi (1,700 km^{2})
  - Land: 647 sq mi (1,680 km^{2})
  - Water: 3.0 sq mi (7.8 km^{2}) 0.5%

Population (2020)
  - Total: 11,511
  - Estimate (2025): 11,577 ▲
  - Density: 17.8/sq mi (6.87/km^{2})
- Time zone: UTC−6 (Central)
  - Summer (DST): UTC−5 (CDT)
- Congressional district: 4th
- Website: perrycountyms.gov

Perry County is a county located in the U.S. state of Mississippi. As of the 2020 census, the population was 11,511. The county seat is New Augusta. The county is named after the War of 1812 naval hero, Oliver Hazard Perry.

Perry County is part of the Hattiesburg, MS Metropolitan Statistical Area.

Until 1906, the county seat was the old town of Augusta, near the center of the county on the east bank of the Leaf River. At Old Augusta, the outlaw James Copeland was executed by hanging on October 30, 1857. Old Augusta remains a small village today. New Augusta, two miles south of Old Augusta, was made the county seat of Perry County, because it was situated on the Mobile, Jackson & Kansas City Railroad.

== Geography ==
According to the U.S. Census Bureau, the county has a total area of 650 square miles (1,700 km^{2}), of which 647 square miles (1,680 km^{2}) is land and 3.0 square miles (7.8 km^{2}) (0.5%) is water.

=== Major highways ===
- U.S. Highway 98
- Mississippi Highway 15
- Mississippi Highway 29
- Mississippi Highway 42

=== Adjacent counties ===
- Wayne County (northeast)
- Greene County (east)
- George County (southeast)
- Stone County (south)
- Forrest County (west)
- Jones County (northwest)

=== National protected area ===
- De Soto National Forest (part)
- Black Creek Wilderness
- Leaf River Wildlife Management Area

== Demographics ==
Historical population
Census	Pop.	Note	%±
1820	2,037		—
1830	2,300		12.9%
1840	1,889		−17.9%
1850	2,438		29.1%
1860	2,606		6.9%
1870	2,694		3.4%
1880	3,427		27.2%
1890	6,494		89.5%
1900	14,682		126.1%
1910	7,685		−47.7%
1920	8,987		16.9%
1930	8,197		−8.8%
1940	9,292		13.4%
1950	9,108		−2.0%
1960	8,745		−4.0%
1970	9,065		3.7%
1980	9,864		8.8%
1990	10,865		10.1%
2000	12,138		11.7%
2010	12,250		0.9%
2020	11,511		−6.0%
2025 (est.)	11,577	▲	0.6%
U.S. Decennial Census; 1790-1960 1900-1990; 1990-2000 2010-2013

=== Racial and ethnic composition ===
Perry County, Mississippi – Racial and ethnic composition Note: the US Census treats Hispanic/Latino as an ethnic category. This table excludes Latinos from the racial categories and assigns them to a separate category. Hispanics/Latinos may be of any race.
Race / Ethnicity (NH = Non-Hispanic)	Pop 1980	Pop 1990	Pop 2000	Pop 2010	Pop 2020	% 1980	% 1990	% 2000	% 2010	% 2020
White alone (NH)	7,666	8,300	9,194	9,514	8,868	77.72%	76.39%	75.75%	77.67%	77.04%
Black or African American alone (NH)	2,101	2,447	2,713	2,449	2,097	21.30%	22.52%	22.35%	19.99%	18.22%
Native American or Alaska Native alone (NH)	5	66	38	32	45	0.05%	0.61%	0.31%	0.26%	0.39%
Asian alone (NH)	5	5	14	14	29	0.05%	0.05%	0.12%	0.11%	0.25%
Native Hawaiian or Pacific Islander alone (NH)	x	x	6	0	3	x	x	0.05%	0.00%	0.03%
Other race alone (NH)	0	1	0	12	13	0.00%	0.01%	0.00%	0.10%	0.11%
Mixed race or Multiracial (NH)	x	x	51	110	302	x	x	0.42%	0.90%	2.62%
Hispanic or Latino (any race)	87	46	122	119	154	0.88%	0.42%	1.01%	0.97%	1.34%
Total	9,864	10,865	12,138	12,250	11,511	100.00%	100.00%	100.00%	100.00%	100.00%

=== 2020 census ===
As of the 2020 census, the county had a population of 11,511. The median age was 43.5 years. 21.7% of residents were under the age of 18 and 19.4% of residents were 65 years of age or older. For every 100 females there were 95.0 males, and for every 100 females age 18 and over there were 92.7 males age 18 and over.

The racial makeup of the county was 77.7% White, 18.2% Black or African American, 0.4% American Indian and Alaska Native, 0.3% Asian, <0.1% Native Hawaiian and Pacific Islander, 0.5% from some other race, and 2.9% from two or more races. Hispanic or Latino residents of any race comprised 1.3% of the population.

<0.1% of residents lived in urban areas, while 100.0% lived in rural areas.

There were 4,653 households in the county, of which 30.1% had children under the age of 18 living in them. Of all households, 47.3% were married-couple households, 18.9% were households with a male householder and no spouse or partner present, and 29.3% were households with a female householder and no spouse or partner present. About 28.0% of all households were made up of individuals and 11.9% had someone living alone who was 65 years of age or older.

There were 5,426 housing units, of which 14.2% were vacant. Among occupied housing units, 80.9% were owner-occupied and 19.1% were renter-occupied. The homeowner vacancy rate was 1.2% and the rental vacancy rate was 12.9%.

== Communities ==
=== Towns ===
- Beaumont
- New Augusta (county seat)
- Richton

=== Census-designated place ===
- Runnelstown

=== Unincorporated communities ===
- Corinth
- Good Hope
- Hintonville
- Janice
- Mahned
- Tallahala
- Wingate

== Notable people ==
- John Prentiss Carter, American politician
- Dale Goodin, American politician
- Tristan Jackson, American football player
- Brandon Sumrall, American football player
- De'Lance Turner, American football player

== Politics ==
Perry County is strongly Republican. It has selected the Republican presidential candidate in every election since 1976, often by large margins. Every election from 2016 through 2024 was the best subsequent Republican performance in the county since 1972.

United States presidential election results for Perry County, Mississippi
Year	Republican		Democratic		Third party(ies)	
Year	No.	%	No.	%	No.	%
1912	4	1.27%	257	81.85%	53	16.88%
1916	32	7.11%	395	87.78%	23	5.11%
1920	69	20.00%	271	78.55%	5	1.45%
1924	55	12.09%	383	84.18%	17	3.74%
1928	277	49.46%	283	50.54%	0	0.00%
1932	15	2.77%	523	96.49%	4	0.74%
1936	16	2.12%	737	97.88%	0	0.00%
1940	18	2.13%	828	97.87%	0	0.00%
1944	44	5.24%	796	94.76%	0	0.00%
1948	25	2.85%	87	9.92%	765	87.23%
1952	511	39.52%	782	60.48%	0	0.00%
1956	347	31.55%	581	52.82%	172	15.64%
1960	274	20.39%	514	38.24%	556	41.37%
1964	1,775	86.42%	279	13.58%	0	0.00%
1968	227	7.08%	439	13.69%	2,541	79.23%
1972	2,689	84.14%	446	13.95%	61	1.91%
1976	1,527	40.99%	1,965	52.75%	233	6.26%
1980	2,255	52.90%	1,957	45.91%	51	1.20%
1984	3,098	65.30%	1,415	29.83%	231	4.87%
1988	2,983	68.62%	1,326	30.50%	38	0.87%
1992	2,538	56.39%	1,490	33.10%	473	10.51%
1996	2,178	53.72%	1,413	34.85%	463	11.42%
2000	3,026	69.42%	1,285	29.48%	48	1.10%
2004	3,747	74.49%	1,261	25.07%	22	0.44%
2008	4,067	71.80%	1,533	27.07%	64	1.13%
2012	4,137	72.30%	1,527	26.69%	58	1.01%
2016	4,135	76.12%	1,220	22.46%	77	1.42%
2020	4,500	76.06%	1,362	23.02%	54	0.91%
2024	4,425	79.89%	1,078	19.46%	36	0.65%

== Education ==
There are two school districts in the county: Perry County Schools and Richton School District.

The county is in the zone for Jones College.

== See also ==
- National Register of Historic Places listings in Perry County, Mississippi
