= 2004 United States presidential election in Mississippi =

- November 2, 2004

Nominee	George W. Bush	John Kerry
Party	Republican	Democratic
Home state	Texas	Massachusetts
Running mate	Dick Cheney	John Edwards
Electoral vote	6	0
Popular vote	684,981	458,094
Percentage	59.45%	39.76%

Bush
50–60%
60–70%
70–80%
80–90%
Kerry
50–60%
60–70%
70–80%
80–90%
President before election
George W. Bush
Republican
Elected President
George W. Bush
Republican

The 2004 United States presidential election in Mississippi took place on November 2, 2004, as part of the 2004 United States presidential election. Voters chose six representatives, or electors to the Electoral College, who voted for president and vice president. It was the first presidential election since the 2000 United States census, after which Mississippi lost one electoral vote, reducing its elector count from seven to six, leaving Mississippi with the fewest electoral votes since 1848.

Mississippi was won by incumbent President George W. Bush of the Republican Party with a 19.69% margin of victory over Democratic nominee John Kerry. Prior to the election, Mississippi was considered a state Bush would win with ease, or a red state. Mississippi has not voted for a Democrat since 1976, when Jimmy Carter carried the state.

== Campaign ==
=== Predictions ===
12 news organizations made state-by-state predictions of the election. These organizations published their predictions just prior to election day:

Source	Ranking
D.C. Political Report	Solid R
Associated Press	Solid R
CNN	Likely R
Cook Political Report	Solid R
Newsweek	Solid R
New York Times	Solid R
Rasmussen Reports	Likely R
Research 2000	Solid R
Washington Post	Likely R
Washington Times	Solid R
Zogby International	Likely R
Washington Dispatch	Likely R

=== Polling ===
Bush won pre-election polling by a double-digit margin.

=== Fundraising ===
Bush raised $866,580. Kerry raised $599,665.

=== Advertising and visits ===
Neither campaign spent or visited this state during the fall campaign.

== Analysis ==
The last Democratic presidential nominee to win Mississippi was fellow Southerner Jimmy Carter in 1976. Due to its reliably conservative voting pattern, neither of the two major party candidates campaigned in the state.

Mississippi is one of the most racially polarized states in presidential elections. Black Mississippians almost uniformly vote Democratic, while white Mississippians vote Republican nearly as consistently. In 2004, 14% of white Mississippians voted for John Kerry and 10% of African Americans voted for Bush. Kerry's main support lay in the western counties on the Delta and next to the Mississippi River.

Pike County, Copiah County, Oktibbeha County, and Yazoo County would not vote Republican again until 2024.

== Results ==
2004 United States presidential election in Mississippi
Party	Candidate	Votes	%	±%
Republican	George W. Bush Dick Cheney	684,981	59.45%	+1.83%
Democratic	John Kerry John Edwards	458,094	39.76%	−0.94%
Reform	Ralph Nader Peter Camejo	3,177	0.28%	+0.05%
Libertarian	Michael Badnarik Richard Campagna	1,793	0.16%	−0.04%
Constitution	Michael Peroutka Chuck Baldwin	1,759	0.15%	−0.18%
Independent	James Harris Margaret Trowe	1,268	0.11%	N/A
Green	David Cobb Pat LaMarche	1,073	0.09%	−0.73%
Total votes		1,152,145	100.00%	N/A

=== By county ===
County	George W. Bush Republican		John Kerry Democratic		Various candidates Other parties		Margin		Total
County	#	%	#	%	#	%	#	%	Total
Adams	6,996	45.22%	8,423	54.45%	51	0.33%	-1,427	-9.22%	15,470
Alcorn	8,634	60.64%	5,454	38.30%	151	1.06%	3,180	22.33%	14,239
Amite	4,147	57.62%	3,012	41.85%	38	0.53%	1,135	15.77%	7,197
Attala	5,014	61.09%	3,145	38.32%	48	0.58%	1,869	22.77%	8,207
Benton	1,969	46.36%	2,245	52.86%	33	0.78%	-276	-6.50%	4,247
Bolivar	5,535	36.16%	9,631	62.92%	141	0.92%	-4,096	-26.76%	15,307
Calhoun	4,131	64.66%	2,234	34.97%	24	0.38%	1,897	29.69%	6,389
Carroll	3,664	65.52%	1,900	33.98%	28	0.50%	1,764	31.55%	5,592
Chickasaw	4,193	50.26%	4,078	48.88%	72	0.86%	115	1.38%	8,343
Choctaw	2,694	66.00%	1,366	33.46%	22	0.54%	1,328	32.53%	4,082
Claiborne	950	17.74%	4,362	81.46%	43	0.80%	-3,412	-63.72%	5,355
Clarke	5,068	67.53%	2,402	32.01%	35	0.47%	2,666	35.52%	7,505
Clay	4,342	47.51%	4,753	52.01%	44	0.48%	-411	-4.50%	9,139
Coahoma	3,676	34.65%	6,805	64.15%	127	1.20%	-3,129	-29.50%	10,608
Copiah	6,374	55.97%	4,961	43.56%	53	0.47%	1,413	12.41%	11,388
Covington	5,044	61.12%	3,158	38.27%	50	0.61%	1,886	22.86%	8,252
DeSoto	36,306	72.32%	13,583	27.06%	311	0.62%	22,723	45.26%	50,200
Forrest	16,318	61.04%	10,220	38.23%	195	0.73%	6,098	22.81%	26,733
Franklin	2,893	64.42%	1,574	35.05%	24	0.53%	1,319	29.37%	4,491
George	6,223	77.78%	1,724	21.55%	54	0.67%	4,499	56.23%	8,001
Greene	3,850	72.66%	1,421	26.82%	28	0.53%	2,429	45.84%	5,299
Grenada	5,872	58.11%	4,180	41.37%	53	0.52%	1,692	16.74%	10,105
Hancock	12,581	70.41%	5,107	28.58%	181	1.01%	7,474	41.83%	17,869
Harrison	39,703	62.75%	23,076	36.47%	488	0.77%	16,627	26.28%	63,267
Hinds	36,975	39.97%	54,845	59.29%	680	0.74%	-17,870	-19.32%	92,500
Holmes	1,961	23.39%	6,366	75.94%	56	0.67%	-4,405	-52.55%	8,383
Humphreys	1,679	34.27%	3,168	64.67%	52	1.06%	-1,489	-30.39%	4,899
Issaquena	439	45.26%	516	53.20%	15	1.55%	-77	-7.94%	970
Itawamba	6,833	70.37%	2,802	28.86%	75	0.77%	4,031	41.51%	9,710
Jackson	35,134	68.82%	15,572	30.50%	343	0.67%	19,562	38.32%	51,049
Jasper	3,855	48.13%	4,117	51.40%	37	0.46%	-262	-3.27%	8,009
Jefferson	630	18.18%	2,821	81.39%	15	0.43%	-2,191	-63.21%	3,466
Jefferson Davis	2,668	46.28%	2,959	51.33%	138	2.39%	-291	-5.05%	5,765
Jones	19,125	71.72%	7,398	27.74%	143	0.54%	11,727	43.98%	26,666
Kemper	2,109	45.82%	2,465	53.55%	29	0.63%	-356	-7.73%	4,603
Lafayette	9,004	58.51%	6,218	40.41%	166	1.08%	2,786	18.11%	15,388
Lamar	16,410	80.19%	3,923	19.17%	132	0.65%	12,487	61.02%	20,465
Lauderdale	19,736	65.42%	10,292	34.12%	138	0.46%	9,444	31.31%	30,166
Lawrence	3,956	62.73%	2,308	36.60%	42	0.67%	1,648	26.13%	6,306
Leake	4,962	60.42%	3,212	39.11%	38	0.46%	1,750	21.31%	8,212
Lee	20,254	66.14%	10,127	33.07%	240	0.78%	10,127	33.07%	30,621
Leflore	4,635	37.19%	7,566	60.71%	262	2.10%	-2,931	-23.52%	12,463
Lincoln	10,008	69.06%	4,418	30.49%	65	0.45%	5,590	38.58%	14,491
Lowndes	13,690	56.41%	10,408	42.89%	170	0.70%	3,282	13.52%	24,268
Madison	24,257	64.30%	13,268	35.17%	199	0.53%	10,989	29.13%	37,724
Marion	7,999	66.95%	3,888	32.54%	60	0.50%	4,111	34.41%	11,947
Marshall	5,975	40.79%	8,591	58.65%	83	0.57%	-2,616	-17.86%	14,649
Monroe	9,308	59.54%	6,237	39.90%	87	0.56%	3,071	19.65%	15,632
Montgomery	3,002	54.62%	2,473	45.00%	21	0.38%	529	9.63%	5,496
Neshoba	7,780	74.68%	2,600	24.96%	38	0.36%	5,180	49.72%	10,418
Newton	6,165	72.64%	2,280	26.86%	42	0.49%	3,885	45.78%	8,487
Noxubee	1,723	28.26%	4,346	71.28%	28	0.46%	-2,623	-43.02%	6,097
Oktibbeha	9,068	55.70%	7,015	43.09%	196	1.20%	2,053	12.61%	16,279
Panola	6,769	50.36%	6,615	49.22%	56	0.42%	154	1.15%	13,440
Pearl River	14,896	76.44%	4,472	22.95%	119	0.61%	10,424	53.49%	19,487
Perry	3,747	74.49%	1,261	25.07%	22	0.44%	2,486	49.42%	5,030
Pike	8,660	52.07%	7,881	47.38%	91	0.55%	779	4.68%	16,632
Pontotoc	8,480	75.44%	2,660	23.67%	100	0.89%	5,820	51.78%	11,240
Prentiss	6,538	65.83%	3,327	33.50%	67	0.67%	3,211	32.33%	9,932
Quitman	1,360	39.81%	2,032	59.48%	24	0.70%	-672	-19.67%	3,416
Rankin	43,054	78.68%	11,005	20.11%	658	1.20%	32,049	58.57%	54,717
Scott	6,395	62.52%	3,802	37.17%	31	0.30%	2,593	25.35%	10,228
Sharkey	1,120	36.21%	1,560	50.44%	413	13.35%	-440	-14.23%	3,093
Simpson	7,138	68.15%	3,272	31.24%	64	0.61%	3,866	36.91%	10,474
Smith	5,577	78.33%	1,496	21.01%	47	0.66%	4,081	57.32%	7,120
Stone	4,146	72.29%	1,528	26.64%	61	1.06%	2,618	45.65%	5,735
Sunflower	3,534	35.29%	6,359	63.49%	122	1.22%	-2,825	-28.21%	10,015
Tallahatchie	2,737	44.02%	3,420	55.01%	60	0.97%	-683	-10.99%	6,217
Tate	6,760	60.54%	4,347	38.93%	60	0.54%	2,413	21.61%	11,167
Tippah	6,174	66.57%	3,016	32.52%	85	0.92%	3,158	34.05%	9,275
Tishomingo	5,379	64.60%	2,846	34.18%	101	1.21%	2,533	30.42%	8,326
Tunica	950	30.36%	2,140	68.39%	39	1.25%	-1,190	-38.03%	3,129
Union	7,906	73.08%	2,839	26.24%	74	0.68%	5,067	46.83%	10,819
Walthall	3,888	61.21%	2,435	38.33%	29	0.46%	1,453	22.87%	6,352
Warren	11,356	57.71%	8,224	41.79%	99	0.50%	3,132	15.92%	19,679
Washington	7,731	39.45%	11,569	59.03%	297	1.52%	-3,838	-19.58%	19,597
Wayne	5,562	63.25%	3,193	36.31%	39	0.44%	2,369	26.94%	8,794
Webster	3,708	73.21%	1,341	26.48%	16	0.32%	2,367	46.73%	5,065
Wilkinson	1,563	35.64%	2,794	63.72%	28	0.64%	-1,231	-28.07%	4,385
Winston	5,386	57.24%	3,978	42.28%	45	0.48%	1,408	14.96%	9,409
Yalobusha	3,278	54.90%	2,656	44.48%	37	0.62%	622	10.42%	5,971
Yazoo	5,672	51.62%	5,013	45.63%	302	2.75%	659	6.00%	10,987
Totals	684,981	59.45%	458,094	39.76%	9,070	0.79%	226,887	19.69%	1,152,145

==== Counties that flipped from Democratic to Republican ====
- Panola (Largest city: Sardis)
- Yalobusha (Largest city: Water Valley)

==== Counties that flipped from Republican to Democratic ====
- Jasper (Largest city: Bay Springs)

=== By congressional district ===
Bush won three out of Mississippi's four congressional districts, including one held by a Democrat.

District	Bush	Kerry	Representative
1st	62%	37%	Roger Wicker
2nd	40%	59%	Bennie Thompson
3rd	65%	34%	Chip Pickering
4th	68%	31%	Gene Taylor

== Electors ==
Mississippi was assigned six electors to cast votes to the Electoral college. Given that Mississippi voted for Bush, all electors were pledged to cast their ballots for Bush. The electors were:

1. Kelly Segars
2. John Phillips
3. Wayne Parker
4. Jimmy Creekmore
5. Victor Mavar
6. Billy Mounger
