= Deuce Knight =

American football player (born 2006)

No. 2 – Ole Miss Rebels
- Position: Quarterback
- Class: Redshirt Freshman

Personal information
- Born: December 2, 2006 (age 19)
- Listed height: 6 ft 5 in (1.96 m)
- Listed weight: 225 lb (102 kg)

Career information
- High school: George County (Lucedale, Mississippi)
- College: Auburn (2025); Ole Miss (2026–present)
- Stats at ESPN

Justin Cashel "Deuce" Knight II (born December 2, 2006) is an American college football quarterback for the Ole Miss Rebels. He previously played for the Auburn Tigers.

== Early life ==
Knight attended both George County High School and Lipscomb Academy, transferring from the former to the latter in 2023 before returning to George County after three games. As a sophomore, he passed for 1,929 yards, 11 touchdowns, and four interceptions, and ran for 488 yards and 12 touchdowns. As a junior, Knight completed 53.2% of his passes for 2,047 yards and 17 touchdowns and rushed for 494 yards and 11 touchdowns. As a senior he threw for 2,082 yards and 24 touchdowns with five interceptions and ran for 450 yards and nine touchdowns, despite missing four games.

=== Recruiting ===
Knight was rated as a five-star recruit, the 6th overall quarterback, and the 26th overall player in the class of 2025 by On3.com. He received offers from schools such as Auburn, Notre Dame, Alabama, Georgia, Tennessee, Miami, Washington, Oregon, TCU, Texas A&M, Ole Miss, South Carolina, Mississippi State, Louisville, Virginia Tech, Colorado, Vanderbilt, and Indiana. Knight initially committed to play college football for the Notre Dame Fighting Irish before flipping his commitment to play for the Auburn Tigers. After getting a late push from Ole Miss, he officially signed with the Tigers on December 4, 2024.

== College career ==
=== Auburn ===
Knight enrolled early at Auburn University, arriving on campus when the spring semester began in January 2025. He competed for the starting job but lost to Jackson Arnold. Knight made his college debut on September 6, 2025, against Ball State. He was 2/5 for 20 passing yards and rushed for 16 yards in a 42-3 win. Knight made his first start against Mercer. On the first play of the game, he ran for a 75-yard touchdown. Knight finished the game 15/20 for 239 passing yards, 2 passing touchdowns, 162 rushing yards and 4 rushing touchdowns and won 62-17.

On December 30, 2025, Knight announced he would enter the NCAA transfer portal with four years of eligibility.

=== Ole Miss ===
On January 11, 2026, Knight committed to the Ole Miss Rebels in his home state of Mississippi.

=== Statistics ===
Season	Team	Games			Passing								Rushing			
Season	Team	GP	GS	Record	Cmp	Att	Pct	Yds	Y/A	TD	Int	Rtg	Att	Yds	Avg	TD
2025	Auburn	2	1	1–0	17	25	68.0	259	10.4	2	0	160.8	13	178	13.7	4
2026	Ole Miss	1	0	0–0	4	8	50.0	68	8.5	0	1	96.4	4	27	6.8	1
Career		3	1	1−0	21	33	63.6	327	9.9	2	1	160.8	17	205	12.1	5

== Personal life ==
Knight is the brother of former NFL wide receiver Ty Fryfogle.
