= Justin Steele =

American baseball player (born 1995)

Chicago Cubs – No. 35
- Pitcher
- Born: July 11, 1995 (age 31); Lucedale, Mississippi, U.S.
- Bats: Left Throws: Left

MLB debut
- April 12, 2021, for the Chicago Cubs

MLB statistics (through 2025 season)
- Win–loss record: 32–22
- Earned run average: 3.30
- Strikeouts: 517
- Stats at Baseball Reference

Teams
- Chicago Cubs (2021–2025)

Career highlights and awards
- All-Star (2023)

Justin Carl Steele (born July 11, 1995) is an American professional baseball pitcher for the Chicago Cubs of Major League Baseball (MLB). He made his MLB debut in 2021 and was an MLB All-Star in 2023.

== Early life ==
Justin Carl Steele was born July 11, 1995, in Lucedale, Mississippi, and was raised in nearby Agricola by Ben Steele and Nicki Clark. Steele and his older brother Jordan spent their childhood practicing baseball in their family backyard. During his sophomore year at George County High School, while rehabilitating a lower back injury, Steele's fastball velocity increased to 90 mph (140 km/h), which attracted the attention of scouts and recruiters. As a junior in 2013, Steele had a 7–3 win–loss record and 1.94 earned run average (ERA) with 98 strikeouts in 61 1/3 innings pitched. In addition to pitching, he spent time as an outfielder and designated hitter, batting .326 with three home runs and 23 runs batted in (RBI). The next year, Steele went 5–1 with a 0.98 ERA and 92 strikeouts in 43 innings, including two no-hitters.

== Professional career ==
=== Draft and minor leagues ===
The Chicago Cubs of Major League Baseball (MLB) selected Steele in the fifth round, 139th overall, of the 2014 Major League Baseball draft. At the time, he had committed to play college baseball at the University of Southern Mississippi. He ultimately joined the Cubs on a $1 million signing bonus. He made his professional debut with the Rookie-level Arizona League Cubs, pitching to a 2.89 ERA with 25 strikeouts in 18 2/3 innings during the 2014 season. The next year, Steele made 10 starts for the Low-A Eugene Emeralds, with whom he went 3–1 with a 2.66 ERA and 38 strikeouts in 40 2/3 innings. In 2016, Steele was promoted to the Single-A South Bend Cubs of the Midwest League. He struggled at the start of the season, going 3-5 with a 6.17 ERA in his first nine games for South Bend, and was sent back to Eugene for June. He finished the season with a 5–7 record, 5.00 ERA, and 76 strikeouts in 77 1/3 innings across 19 starts. Most of Steele's troubles came from batted balls: his 3.48 Fielding Independent Pitching (FIP) was a significant improvement over his ERA, and hitters had a .383 batting average on balls in play against him that season.

Steele started 2017 with the Myrtle Beach Pelicans, but had his season cut short in August due to injury which required Tommy John surgery. In 20 starts prior to the injury, he went 6–7 with a 2.92 ERA. He returned from the injury in 2018 and pitched for the AZL Cubs, Myrtle Beach, and Double-A Tennessee Smokies, pitching to a combined 2–2 record with a 2.31 ERA in 11 starts. After the season, he played in the Arizona Fall League. The Cubs also added Steele to their 40-man roster after the season, in order to protect him from the Rule 5 draft.

Steele returned to the Smokies in 2019, going 0–6 with a 5.59 ERA and 42 strikeouts over 11 starts. He did not play in a game in 2020 due to the cancellation of the minor league season because of the COVID-19 pandemic.

=== Chicago Cubs (2021–present) ===
On August 2, 2020, Steele was promoted to the major leagues for the first time but was optioned down on August 6 without appearing in a game. On April 12, 2021, Steele was again promoted to the majors. He made his MLB debut that night against the Milwaukee Brewers, striking out the first batter he saw, Daniel Robertson. He finished the year with a 4-4 record, throwing 59 strikeouts and putting up a 4.26 ERA.

In 2022, Steele went 4-7 over 24 starts with a 3.18 ERA and 126 strikeouts. In 7 starts after the All-Star break, he posted a 0.98 ERA while recording 49 strikeouts before a back injury ended his season.

In 2023, Steele was 16–5 with a 3.06 ERA and 176 strikeouts over 30 starts. On September 4, Steele had a career-high 12 strikeouts and won his 16th game of the year as the Cubs won 5-0 against the San Francisco Giants. He selected as an All-Star and finished fifth in the Cy Young Award voting that year.

On March 9, 2024, Steele was named the Opening Day starter for the Cubs. Steele exited his Opening Day start against the Texas Rangers and was placed on the 15-day injured list on March 30 with a left hamstring strain. On May 6, the Cubs activated Steele from the injured list. He consistently made his starts until September 2, when it was revealed that he would miss his next start due to elbow soreness. Steele was later diagnosed with left elbow inflammation following an MRI on September 3. He was later placed on the 15-day injured list on September 4 with left elbow tendinitis.

Steele began the 2025 season pitching out of Chicago's rotation, posting a 3-1 record and 4.76 ERA with 21 strikeouts in 22 2/3 innings pitched over 4 starts. On April 13, 2025, it was announced that Steele would require season-ending surgery on his left elbow. On April 19, the surgery was specified as a "revision repair" of his left ulnar collateral ligament.

On April 28, 2026, Steele was ruled out for at least a month after suffering a flexor strain during his rehabilitation from surgery.

== Personal life ==
Steele comes from an athletic family: his father played college football for Alabama, his grandfather played college basketball at Southern Miss, and his brother Jordan was a pitcher at Mississippi Gulf Coast Community College. Steele proposed to his girlfriend, Libby Murphy, in 2022. The couple have one child together, a son born July 2022. Steele hosts a podcast on the Barstool Sports network titled "Steele the Show".

== Pitching Style ==
Steele is left-handed, and throws five pitches. He throws two pitches significantly more than his others, a cut four-seam fastball at roughly 89-92 mph, and a slider at 81-84 mph, which combine to make up about 87% of his pitches thrown. In 2023, the season in which he finished fifth in National League Cy Young Award voting, he threw his four-seam fastball and slider 96.6% of the time. He also occasionally throws a sinker at a similar speed to his four-seam fastball, a changeup at 83-86 mph, and a curveball at 78-80 mph. He throws at a 45 degree arm angle.

Batters find it difficult to barrel his pitches because he creates spin and seam action to achieve movement on his pitches that his arm slot cannot usually produce. This has allowed Steele to succeed at the major league level without exceptional fastball velocity.
