= Alonzo Lawrence =

American gridiron football player (born 1989)

Profile
- Position: Defensive back

Personal information
- Born: October 15, 1989 (age 37); Dallas, Texas, U.S.
- Listed height: 6 ft 0 in (1.83 m)
- Listed weight: 220 lb (100 kg)

Career information
- High school: Lucedale (MS) George County
- College: Miss. Gulf Coast CC

Career history
- 2012: Detroit Lions*
- 2012: Saskatchewan Roughriders*
- 2013: Toronto Argonauts
- 2014: Edmonton Eskimos
- * Offseason or practice squad member only

Awards and highlights
- NJCAA All-American (2011)
- Stats at CFL.ca (archive)

Alonzo Lawrence (born October 15, 1989) is an American former professional football defensive back. Lawrence first enrolled at the University of Alabama before transferring to the University of Southern Mississippi and lastly arriving at Mississippi Gulf Coast Community College. He was a member of the Detroit Lions, Saskatchewan Roughriders, Toronto Argonauts and Edmonton Eskimos.

== Early life and college ==
Lawrence attended George County High School in Lucedale, Mississippi.

Lawrence spent his redshirt freshman season at the University of Alabama. He transferred to the University of Southern Mississippi the next season but did not play. He later played two years at Mississippi Gulf Coast Community College and was a NJCAA All-American in 2011.

== Professional career ==
Lawrence was signed by the Detroit Lions on April 30, 2012. He was released by the Lions on June 22, 2012.

Lawrence signed with the Saskatchewan Roughriders on August 27, 2012, and spent the 2012 season on the Roughriders' practice squad.

Lawrence was signed by the Toronto Argonauts on May 29, 2013. He was named Defensive Player of the Week for Week Seven of the 2013 season. Lawrence was released by the Argonauts on June 21, 2014.

Lawrence was signed by the Edmonton Eskimos on July 14, 2014. He was released by the Eskimos on June 13, 2015.
