= Beaumont, Mississippi =

- Town
- Location of Beaumont, Mississippi

- Location in the United States
- Coordinates: 31°10′5″N 88°55′21″W
- Country: United States
- State: Mississippi
- County: Perry

Area
  - Total: 3.45 sq mi (8.94 km^{2})
  - Land: 3.45 sq mi (8.93 km^{2})
  - Water: 0.0039 sq mi (0.01 km^{2})
- Elevation: 92 ft (28 m)

Population (2020)
  - Total: 669
  - Density: 194.1/sq mi (74.93/km^{2})
- Time zone: UTC-6 (Central (CST))
  - Summer (DST): UTC-5 (CDT)
- ZIP code: 39423
- Area code: 601
- FIPS code: 28-04500
- GNIS feature ID: 0692498

Beaumont is a town in Perry County, Mississippi. It is part of the Hattiesburg, Mississippi Metropolitan Statistical Area, and located on the edge of the De Soto National Forest. As of the 2020 census, Beaumont had a population of 669.

== Geography ==
Beaumont is located at 31°10′5″N 88°55′21″W (31.168178, -88.922588).

According to the United States Census Bureau, the town has a total area of 3.5 square miles (9.1 km^{2}), of which 3.5 square miles (9.1 km^{2}) is land and 0.29% is water.

== Demographics ==
Historical population
Census	Pop.	Note	%±
1960	926		—
1970	1,061		14.6%
1980	1,112		4.8%
1990	1,054		−5.2%
2000	977		−7.3%
2010	951		−2.7%
2020	669		−29.7%
U.S. Decennial Census

=== 2020 census ===
Beaumont racial composition
Race	Num.	Perc.
White (non-Hispanic)	328	49.03%
Black or African American (non-Hispanic)	301	44.99%
Native American	7	1.05%
Pacific Islander	1	0.15%
Other/Mixed	19	2.84%
Hispanic or Latino	13	1.94%

As of the 2020 United States census, there were 669 people, 381 households, and 242 families residing in the town.

=== 2000 census ===
As of the census of 2000, there were 977 people, 387 households, and 270 families residing in the town. The population density was 280.6 inhabitants per square mile (108.3/km^{2}). There were 448 housing units at an average density of 128.7 per square mile (49.7/km^{2}). The racial makeup of the town was 51.38% White, 47.49% African American, 0.92% Native American, 0.10% from other races, and 0.10% from two or more races. Hispanic or Latino of any race were 0.31% of the population.

There were 387 households, out of which 33.9% had children under the age of 18 living with them, 44.2% were married couples living together, 22.2% had a female householder with no husband present, and 30.2% were non-families. 28.4% of all households were made up of individuals, and 10.9% had someone living alone who was 65 years of age or older. The average household size was 2.52 and the average family size was 3.09.

In the town, the population was spread out, with 28.9% under the age of 18, 8.3% from 18 to 24, 29.3% from 25 to 44, 21.6% from 45 to 64, and 12.0% who were 65 years of age or older. The median age was 33 years. For every 100 females, there were 87.5 males. For every 100 females age 18 and over, there were 83.9 males.

The median income for a household in the town was $20,147, and the median income for a family was $24,250. Males had a median income of $30,250 versus $17,083 for females. The per capita income for the town was $9,601. About 32.4% of families and 35.4% of the population were below the poverty line, including 46.8% of those under age 18 and 43.4% of those age 65 or over.

== Education ==
The Town of Beaumont is served by the Perry County School District. There is an elementary school (K8) in Beaumont, and secondary education is provided in New Augusta.

The county is in the zone for Jones College.

== Climate ==
The climate in this area is characterized by relatively high temperatures and evenly distributed precipitation throughout the year. According to the Köppen Climate Classification system, Beaumont has a Humid subtropical climate, abbreviated "Cfa" on climate maps.

On April 17, 2022, the town was heavily damaged by an EF2 tornado, which damaged or destroyed multiple buildings, homes, trees, and power poles and lines.

Climate data for Beaumont Experiment Station, Alabama (1991–2020 normals, extremes 1942–1976, 1991–present)
Month	Jan	Feb	Mar	Apr	May	Jun	Jul	Aug	Sep	Oct	Nov	Dec	Year
Record high °F (°C)	82 (28)	85 (29)	91 (33)	95 (35)	101 (38)	104 (40)	105 (41)	105 (41)	102 (39)	100 (38)	90 (32)	84 (29)	105 (41)
Mean maximum °F (°C)	77.3 (25.2)	80.1 (26.7)	85.5 (29.7)	88.6 (31.4)	94.4 (34.7)	97.4 (36.3)	98.8 (37.1)	99.0 (37.2)	96.7 (35.9)	92.1 (33.4)	84.4 (29.1)	79.1 (26.2)	100.1 (37.8)
Mean daily maximum °F (°C)	61.5 (16.4)	65.7 (18.7)	72.8 (22.7)	79.6 (26.4)	86.8 (30.4)	91.9 (33.3)	93.5 (34.2)	93.7 (34.3)	90.3 (32.4)	81.8 (27.7)	71.2 (21.8)	63.7 (17.6)	79.4 (26.3)
Daily mean °F (°C)	48.6 (9.2)	52.4 (11.3)	59.0 (15.0)	65.6 (18.7)	73.5 (23.1)	80.1 (26.7)	82.1 (27.8)	81.9 (27.7)	77.7 (25.4)	67.4 (19.7)	56.8 (13.8)	50.8 (10.4)	66.3 (19.1)
Mean daily minimum °F (°C)	35.6 (2.0)	39.2 (4.0)	45.2 (7.3)	51.6 (10.9)	60.2 (15.7)	68.2 (20.1)	70.7 (21.5)	70.1 (21.2)	65.2 (18.4)	53.1 (11.7)	42.4 (5.8)	38.0 (3.3)	53.3 (11.8)
Mean minimum °F (°C)	19.1 (−7.2)	23.3 (−4.8)	27.5 (−2.5)	35.8 (2.1)	46.6 (8.1)	59.5 (15.3)	64.7 (18.2)	63.0 (17.2)	52.1 (11.2)	36.1 (2.3)	26.6 (−3.0)	23.4 (−4.8)	17.6 (−8.0)
Record low °F (°C)	9 (−13)	10 (−12)	15 (−9)	28 (−2)	40 (4)	47 (8)	54 (12)	54 (12)	41 (5)	29 (−2)	15 (−9)	11 (−12)	9 (−13)
Average precipitation inches (mm)	6.12 (155)	5.06 (129)	6.03 (153)	5.42 (138)	5.18 (132)	5.69 (145)	6.05 (154)	5.72 (145)	4.06 (103)	4.20 (107)	4.17 (106)	6.16 (156)	63.86 (1,622)
Average snowfall inches (cm)	0.0 (0.0)	0.0 (0.0)	0.3 (0.76)	0.0 (0.0)	0.0 (0.0)	0.0 (0.0)	0.0 (0.0)	0.0 (0.0)	0.0 (0.0)	0.0 (0.0)	0.0 (0.0)	0.2 (0.51)	0.5 (1.3)
Average precipitation days (≥ 0.01 in)	10.2	8.9	8.8	6.9	8.2	10.6	11.6	9.9	7.7	5.9	7.2	9.5	105.4
Average snowy days (≥ 0.1 in)	0.0	0.0	0.0	0.0	0.0	0.0	0.0	0.0	0.0	0.0	0.0	0.0	0.0
Source: NOAA

== Notable people ==
- Tristan Jackson, former professional Canadian football defensive back
- Brandon Sumrall, former NFL cornerback
