= Gopher Farm sandhill =

Sand formation in Wayne County, Mississippi

Coordinates: 31.500674°N 88.833674°W

- Sand formation
- Interactive map of Gopher Farm sandhill
- Location: Wayne County, Mississippi, United States
- Geology: Sandy soil (Wadley series)
- Operator: Rangers (DeSoto National Forest)

Gopher Farm sandhill is a sand formation in southwestern Wayne County, Mississippi. It lies in the DeSoto National Forest and is tended by a staff of rangers. The sandy soil, largely mapped as Wadley series, harbors a population of gopher tortoises. Forested areas are dominated by longleaf pine and turkey oak.
