= Crossroads, George County, Mississippi =

- Unincorporated community
- Location within Mississippi Location within the United States
- Coordinates: 30°53′7″N 88°42′38″W
- Country: United States
- State: Mississippi
- County: George
- Elevation: 148 ft (45 m)
- Time zone: UTC-6 (Central (CST))
  - Summer (DST): UTC-5 (CDT)
- GNIS feature ID: 668976

Crossroads (also Cross Roads) is an unincorporated community in George County, Mississippi. Its elevation is 148 feet (45 m). Prior to the creation of George County, Crossroads was located in Jackson County.

A post office operated under the name Crossroads from 1834 to 1910.
