= Corinth, Perry County, Mississippi =

Corinth, Mississippi
- Unincorporated community
- Location within Mississippi Location within the United States
- Coordinates: 31°20′38″N 89°08′23″W
- Country: United States
- State: Mississippi
- County: Perry
- Elevation: 180 ft (55 m)
- Time zone: UTC-6 (Central (CST))
  - Summer (DST): UTC-5 (CDT)
- Area codes: 601 & 769
- GNIS feature ID: 691788

Corinth is an unincorporated community in Perry County, Mississippi, United States. Corinth is located in northwest Perry County 9 miles (14 km) east of Hattiesburg.
