= McKinnley Jackson =

American football player (born 2001)

No. 65 – San Francisco 49ers
- Position: Defensive tackle
- Roster status: Practice squad

Personal information
- Born: December 26, 2001 (age 24); Lucedale, Mississippi, U.S.
- Listed height: 6 ft 2 in (1.88 m)
- Listed weight: 330 lb (150 kg)

Career information
- High school: George County (Lucedale, Mississippi)
- College: Texas A&M (2020–2023)
- NFL draft: 2024: 3rd round, 97th overall pick

Career history
- Cincinnati Bengals (2024–2025); San Francisco 49ers (2026–present)*
- * Offseason or practice squad member only

Career NFL statistics as of 2025
- Total tackles: 22
- Sacks: 1.0
- Forced fumbles: 1
- Stats at Pro Football Reference

McKinnley Jackson (born December 26, 2001) is an American professional football defensive tackle for the San Francisco 49ers of the National Football League (NFL). He played college football for the Texas A&M Aggies.

== Early life ==
Jackson's hometown is Lucedale, Mississippi, and he attended George County High School. In Jackson's high school career, he notched 308 tackles with 135 going for a loss, 34 sacks, six fumble recoveries, 16 forced fumbles, two blocked field goals, and two rushing touchdowns. Jackson would decide to commit to play college football at Texas A&M over other schools such as Alabama, Auburn, and LSU.

== College career ==
In the 2021 Orange Bowl, Jackson had two tackles with one being for a loss, and a sack, as he helped the Aggies win their bowl, beating North Carolina. Jackson finished the 2020 season with 13 tackles with two going for a loss, a sack and a half, and two pass deflections. For his performance on the season, Jackson was named to the 2020 SEC All Freshman Team. In the 2021 season, Jackson finished the year with 14 tackles with one being for a loss, and a sack. In week eight of the 2022 season, Jackson had a career performance, racking up 12 tackles with 1.5 tackles going for a loss, and a sack, but Texas A&M would fall to Ole Miss. Jackson finished his breakout 2022 season with 37 tackles with seven going for a loss, two sacks, and a fumble recovery. Jackson was named preseason second team all SEC, for the 2023 season.

== Professional career ==
Pre-draft measurables
Height	Weight	Arm length	Hand span	Wingspan	40-yard dash	10-yard split	20-yard split	20-yard shuttle	Three-cone drill	Vertical jump	Broad jump	Bench press
6 ft 1 1/2 in (1.87 m)	326 lb (148 kg)	33 7/8 in (0.86 m)	10 in (0.25 m)	6 ft 8 1/4 in (2.04 m)	5.26 s	1.78 s	3.01 s	4.90 s	7.89 s	23.0 in (0.58 m)	8 ft 10 in (2.69 m)	24 reps
All values from NFL Combine/Pro Day

=== Cincinnati Bengals ===
Jackson was drafted by the Cincinnati Bengals in the third round (97th overall) of the 2024 NFL draft. He was placed on injured reserve on August 29, 2024. He was activated on October 4.

On August 30, 2026, Jackson was waived by the Bengals as a part of final roster cuts.

=== San Francisco 49ers ===
On September 15, 2026, Jackson was signed to the San Francisco 49ers' practice squad.
