= Wingate, Mississippi =

- Unincorporated community
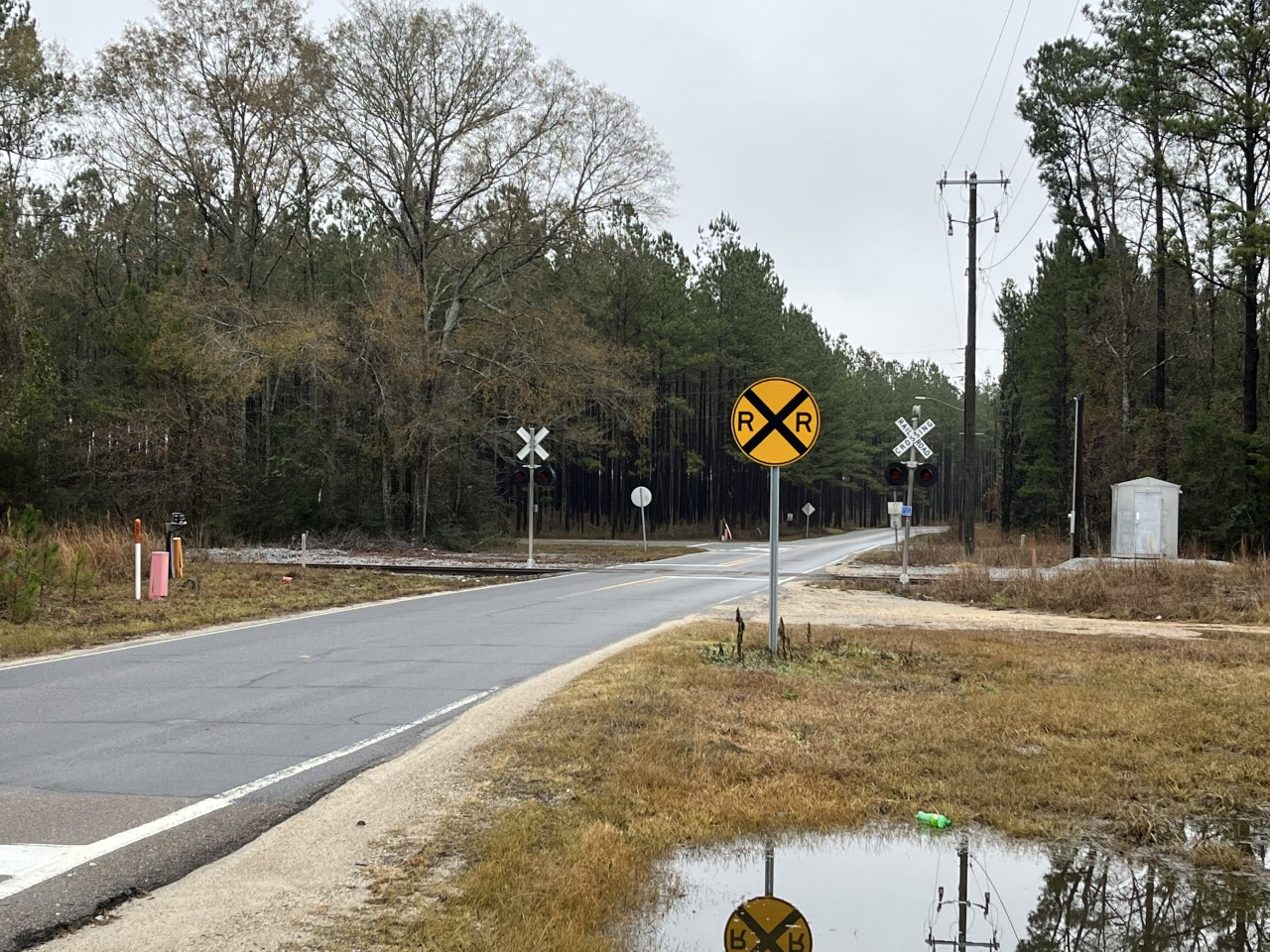
- Canadian National Railway crossing in Wingate, Mississippi

- Location within Mississippi Location within the United States
- Coordinates: 31°12′10″N 89°00′05″W
- Country: United States
- State: Mississippi
- County: Perry
- Elevation: 115 ft (35 m)
- Time zone: UTC-6 (Central (CST))
  - Summer (DST): UTC-5 (CDT)
- Area code: 601
- GNIS feature ID: 695195

Wingate is an unincorporated community located in Perry County, Mississippi.

== History ==
Wingate is located on the former Illinois Central Railroad. It was formerly home to a school, several stores, railroad stop, and two sawmills. The railroad station was closed in 1912.

A post office operated under the name Wingate from 1902 to 1926.
