= Basin, Mississippi =

- Unincorporated community
- Location within Mississippi Location within the United States
- Coordinates: 30°48′11″N 88°39′46″W
- Country: United States
- State: Mississippi
- County: George
- Elevation: 141 ft (43 m)
- Time zone: UTC-6 (Central (CST))
  - Summer (DST): UTC-5 (CDT)
- GNIS feature ID: 666556

Basin (originally Helveston) is an unincorporated community in George County, Mississippi, United States. Prior to the creation of George County, Basin was located in Jackson County.

A post office operated under the name Basin from 1887 to 1922.

The Basin soil series is named for the community.
