= George County, Mississippi =

County in Mississippi, United States

- County
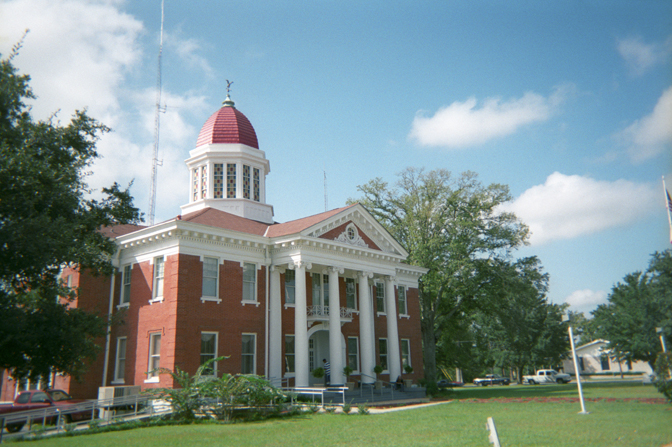
- George County Courthouse in Lucedale

- Location within the U.S. state of Mississippi
- Coordinates: 30°52′N 88°38′W
- Country: United States
- State: Mississippi
- Founded: 1910
- Named for: James Z. George
- Seat: Lucedale
- Largest city: Lucedale

Area
  - Total: 484 sq mi (1,250 km^{2})
  - Land: 479 sq mi (1,240 km^{2})
  - Water: 4.9 sq mi (13 km^{2}) 1.0%

Population (2020)
  - Total: 24,350
  - Estimate (2025): 26,331 ▲
  - Density: 50.8/sq mi (19.6/km^{2})
- Time zone: UTC−6 (Central)
  - Summer (DST): UTC−5 (CDT)
- Congressional district: 4th
- Website: www.georgecountyms.com/index.html

George County is a county located in the U.S. state of Mississippi. As of the 2020 census, the population was 24,350. Its county seat is Lucedale. The county is located adjacent to the Alabama state line.

== History ==
George County was named after Senator James Z. George and was formed on March 16, 1910, from parts of land formerly included in Jackson and Greene Counties.

The Gulf, Mobile and Ohio Railroad ran through Lucedale on its way to Mobile.

== Geography ==
According to the U.S. Census Bureau, the county has a total area of 484 square miles (1,250 km^{2}), of which 479 square miles (1,240 km^{2}) is land and 4.9 square miles (13 km^{2}) (1.0%) is water.

=== Major highways ===
- U.S. Highway 98
- Mississippi Highway 26
- Mississippi Highway 57
- Mississippi Highway 63
- Mississippi Highway 198

=== Adjacent counties ===
- Greene County (north)
- Mobile County, Alabama (east)
- Jackson County (south)
- Stone County (west)
- Perry County (northwest)

=== National protected area ===
- De Soto National Forest (part)

== Demographics ==
Historical population
Census	Pop.	Note	%±
1910	6,599		—
1920	5,564		−15.7%
1930	7,523		35.2%
1940	8,704		15.7%
1950	10,012		15.0%
1960	11,098		10.8%
1970	12,459		12.3%
1980	15,927		27.8%
1990	16,673		4.7%
2000	19,144		14.8%
2010	22,578		17.9%
2020	24,350		7.8%
2025 (est.)	26,331	▲	8.1%
U.S. Decennial Census; 1790-1960 1900-1990; 1990-2000 2010-2013

=== Racial and ethnic composition ===
George County, Mississippi – Racial and ethnic composition Note: the US Census treats Hispanic/Latino as an ethnic category. This table excludes Latinos from the racial categories and assigns them to a separate category. Hispanics/Latinos may be of any race.
Race / Ethnicity (NH = Non-Hispanic)	Pop 1980	Pop 1990	Pop 2000	Pop 2010	Pop 2020	% 1980	% 1990	% 2000	% 2010	% 2020
White alone (NH)	13,733	14,989	16,976	20,009	20,929	89.78%	89.90%	88.68%	88.62%	85.95%
Black or African American alone (NH)	1,447	1,581	1,681	1,821	1,774	9.46%	9.48%	8.78%	8.07%	7.29%
Native American or Alaska Native alone (NH)	3	38	45	66	85	0.02%	0.23%	0.24%	0.29%	0.35%
Asian alone (NH)	15	17	30	47	77	0.10%	0.10%	0.16%	0.21%	0.32%
Native Hawaiian or Pacific Islander alone (NH)	x	x	0	0	1	x	x	0.00%	0.00%	0.00%
Other race alone (NH)	1	0	12	12	41	0.01%	0.00%	0.06%	0.05%	0.17%
Mixed race or Multiracial (NH)	x	x	93	170	771	x	x	0.49%	0.75%	3.17%
Hispanic or Latino (any race)	98	48	307	453	672	0.64%	0.29%	1.60%	2.01%	2.76%
Total	15,297	16,673	19,144	22,578	24,350	100.00%	100.00%	100.00%	100.00%	100.00%

=== 2020 census ===
As of the 2020 census, the county had a population of 24,350. The median age was 38.5 years. 25.0% of residents were under the age of 18 and 16.3% of residents were 65 years of age or older. For every 100 females there were 101.5 males, and for every 100 females age 18 and over there were 100.6 males age 18 and over.

The racial makeup of the county was 86.7% White, 7.3% Black or African American, 0.4% American Indian and Alaska Native, 0.3% Asian, <0.1% Native Hawaiian and Pacific Islander, 1.5% from some other race, and 3.8% from two or more races. Hispanic or Latino residents of any race comprised 2.8% of the population.

<0.1% of residents lived in urban areas, while 100.0% lived in rural areas.

There were 8,916 households in the county, of which 34.8% had children under the age of 18 living in them. Of all households, 55.1% were married-couple households, 17.0% were households with a male householder and no spouse or partner present, and 23.0% were households with a female householder and no spouse or partner present. About 23.1% of all households were made up of individuals and 10.6% had someone living alone who was 65 years of age or older.

There were 10,280 housing units, of which 13.3% were vacant. Among occupied housing units, 81.6% were owner-occupied and 18.4% were renter-occupied. The homeowner vacancy rate was 1.0% and the rental vacancy rate was 13.3%.

== Politics ==
The county has gone solidly Republican in the last ten Presidential elections. In past Presidential elections third-party candidates sometimes did well here. In 1968, George Wallace won the county with over 90 percent of the vote, which was the second highest percentage he received in any county. In 1988, the county gave David Duke 4.21%, his best performance in the nation. In that election it also gave more support to Lenora Fulani than she received in most of the nation. In 2012, President Obama only received 14 percent of the vote, and Hillary Clinton received barely ten percent in 2016. In 2020, George County was only one of two counties that voted against replacing the state flag. The other was neighbouring Greene County.

The county is located in Mississippi's 4th congressional district, which has a Cook Partisan Voting Index of R+21 and is represented by Republican Mike Ezell.

United States presidential election results for George County, Mississippi
Year	Republican		Democratic		Third party(ies)	
Year	No.	%	No.	%	No.	%
1912	5	1.72%	231	79.38%	55	18.90%
1916	32	7.96%	341	84.83%	29	7.21%
1920	56	16.67%	263	78.27%	17	5.06%
1924	68	11.93%	502	88.07%	0	0.00%
1928	369	52.34%	336	47.66%	0	0.00%
1932	19	2.25%	824	97.63%	1	0.12%
1936	24	2.61%	892	97.17%	2	0.22%
1940	38	3.87%	945	96.13%	0	0.00%
1944	92	8.05%	1,051	91.95%	0	0.00%
1948	25	2.14%	108	9.26%	1,033	88.59%
1952	603	30.86%	1,351	69.14%	0	0.00%
1956	403	24.26%	1,150	69.24%	108	6.50%
1960	310	14.97%	844	40.75%	917	44.28%
1964	2,797	92.04%	242	7.96%	0	0.00%
1968	171	3.91%	214	4.89%	3,992	91.20%
1972	3,979	92.90%	270	6.30%	34	0.79%
1976	1,957	37.43%	3,072	58.75%	200	3.82%
1980	3,052	51.45%	2,757	46.48%	123	2.07%
1984	4,346	72.10%	1,655	27.46%	27	0.45%
1988	4,545	58.40%	2,435	31.29%	802	10.31%
1992	4,141	43.55%	2,650	27.87%	2,718	28.58%
1996	3,311	55.71%	1,888	31.77%	744	12.52%
2000	5,143	70.61%	1,977	27.14%	164	2.25%
2004	6,223	77.78%	1,724	21.55%	54	0.67%
2008	7,700	82.49%	1,532	16.41%	103	1.10%
2012	8,376	84.98%	1,359	13.79%	121	1.23%
2016	8,696	87.92%	1,027	10.38%	168	1.70%
2020	9,713	87.91%	1,218	11.02%	118	1.07%
2024	9,858	89.06%	1,138	10.28%	73	0.66%

== Communities ==
=== City ===
- Lucedale (county seat)

=== Census-designated places ===
- Agricola
- Benndale

=== Unincorporated places ===
- Basin
- Bexley
- Crossroads
- Merrill
- Shipman

== Education ==
The sole school district is George County School District.

== See also ==
- Dry counties
- National Register of Historic Places listings in George County, Mississippi
