= Perry County School District (Mississippi) =

School district in Mississippi

The Perry County School District is a public school district based in New Augusta, Mississippi (USA).

In addition to New Augusta, the district also serves the town of Beaumont as well as the census-designated place of Runnelstown and most rural areas in Perry County, except for northeastern areas.

== Schools ==
- Perry Central High School (Grades 9-12)
- Beaumont Elementary School (Grades K-8)
- New Augusta Elementary School (Grades K-8)
- Runnelstown Elementary School (Grades K-8)

== Demographics ==
=== 2006-07 school year ===
There were a total of 1,400 students enrolled in the Perry County School District during the 2006–2007 school year. The gender makeup of the district was 48% female and 52% male. The racial makeup of the district was 33.50% African American, 65.86% White, 0.43% Hispanic, and 0.21% Native American. 64.4% of the district's students were eligible to receive free lunch.

=== Previous school years ===
School Year	Enrollment	Gender Makeup		Racial Makeup				
School Year	Enrollment	Female	Male	Asian	African American	Hispanic	Native American	White
2005-06	1,411	48%	52%	–	35.79%	0.28%	0.14%	63.78%
2004-05	1,354	47%	53%	–	36.78%	0.08%	0.15%	63.00%
2003-04	1,333	48%	52%	0.08%	36.98%	–	0.08%	62.87%
2002-03	1,375	48%	52%	0.07%	36.80%	0.15%	0.07%	62.91%

== Accountability statistics ==
	2006-07	2005-06	2004-05	2003-04	2002-03
District Accreditation Status	Accredited	Accredited	Accredited	Accredited	Accredited
School Performance Classifications
Level 5 (Superior Performing) Schools	0	0	0	0	0
Level 4 (Exemplary) Schools	0	3	1	4	0
Level 3 (Successful) Schools	4	1	3	0	4
Level 2 (Under Performing) Schools	0	0	0	0	0
Level 1 (Low Performing) Schools	0	0	0	0	0
Not Assigned	0	0	0	0	0

== See also ==
- List of school districts in Mississippi
