= Old Augusta Historic Site =

- U.S. National Register of Historic Places
- Mississippi Landmark
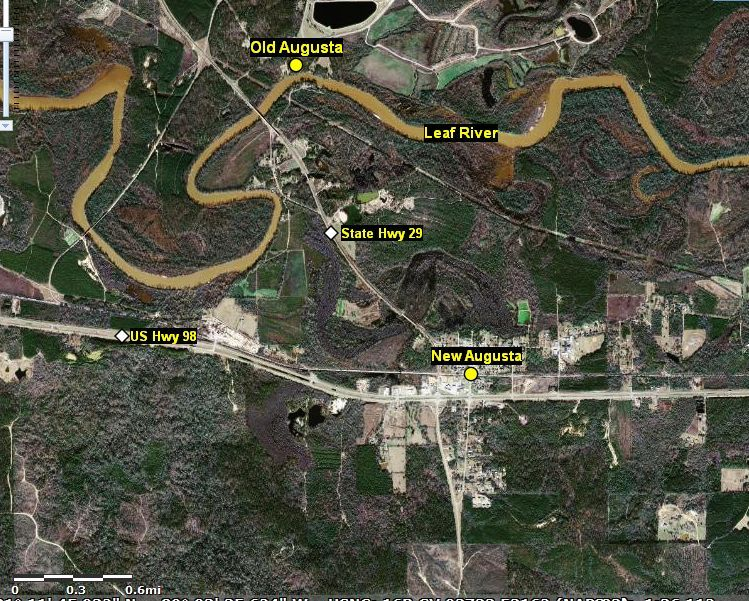
- Aerial view of Historic Site

- Location within Mississippi Location within the United States
- Location: Perry County, Mississippi
- Coordinates: 31°13′28″N 89°02′59″W
- NRHP reference No.: 79001334
- USMS No.: 111-NAU-5001-NR-ML

Significant dates
- Added to NRHP: April 24, 1979
- Designated USMS: January 13, 1999

The Old Augusta Historic Site contains the remnants of Augusta, Mississippi, a town that was founded along the Leaf River in 1812 and abandoned between 1902 and 1906. The site was added to the National Register of Historic Places in 1979 and was designated a Mississippi Landmark in 1999.

== History ==
From 1818 until 1906, the town of Augusta served as the county seat for Perry County, Mississippi. It was considered a major commercial and administrative center because a United States General Land Office was located there. In October and November 1833, the first public sale of Choctaw cession lands occurred in Augusta, Clinton, and Chocchuma.

In the 1850s, Augusta was the site for the trial and hanging of the outlaw James Copeland. In the 1890s, Davis Hawthorne was hanged in Augusta for the murder of his wife.

When the Mobile, Jackson, and Kansas City Railroad was constructed 2 miles (3.2 km) south of Augusta, the town was moved to the railroad and developed as New Augusta.

In 1983, Georgia-Pacific constructed the Old Augusta Railroad to haul products from the Leaf River Cellulose mill that was built adjacent to the site of Old Augusta.

== Historic Site ==
When the site was evaluated for the National Register of Historic Places during the 1970s, it was determined that the town had been divided into three spatial units—a government district, a business district, and a residential district. But there was little more than brick and concrete rubble where buildings had once stood, and the area had reverted to woodland.
