= George County High School =

Coordinates: 30.8751°N 88.5954°W

Location
- 9284 Old Highway 63 South; Lucedale, Mississippi 39452; United States

Information
- Type: Public
- School district: George County School District
- Superintendent: Debra Joiner
- Principal: Jason Holland
- Faculty: 76.35 (on an FTE basis)
- Grades: 9–12
- Enrollment: 1,118 (2023-2024)
- Student to teacher ratio: 14.64
- Colors: Maroon, gold, and white
- Team name: Rebels
- Website: gcsd_gchs.campuscontact.com

George County High School is a public high school in Lucedale, Mississippi, United States. It is a part of the George County School District.

== Athletics ==
The following sports are offered at George County:

- Band
- Baseball
- Basketball
- Color Guard
- Cheer
- Cross Country
- Dance
- Football
- Golf
- Powerlifting
- Soccer
- Softball
- Tennis
- Track
- Volleyball

== Demographics ==
For the 2014–15 school year, 87% of the student body at George County identified as Caucasian, making up the majority. 11% identified as African American, 2% as Hispanic, 1% as Asian, 0.3% as mixed and 0.2% as Native American. The student body makeup is 52% female and 48% male.

== Notable alumni ==
- McKinnley Jackson, NFL defensive tackle for the Cincinnati Bengals
- Deuce Knight, college football quarterback for the Ole Miss Rebels
- Trevor McDonald, Pitcher for the San Francisco Giants
- Eric Moulds, former NFL wide receiver
