= 1976 United States presidential election in Mississippi =

- November 2, 1976

Nominee	Jimmy Carter	Gerald Ford
Party	Democratic	Republican
Home state	Georgia	Michigan
Running mate	Walter Mondale	Bob Dole
Electoral vote	7	0
Popular vote	381,309	366,846
Percentage	49.56%	47.68%

Carter
40–50%
50–60%
60–70%
70–80%
Ford
40–50%
50–60%
60–70%
President before election
Gerald Ford
Republican
Elected President
Jimmy Carter
Democratic

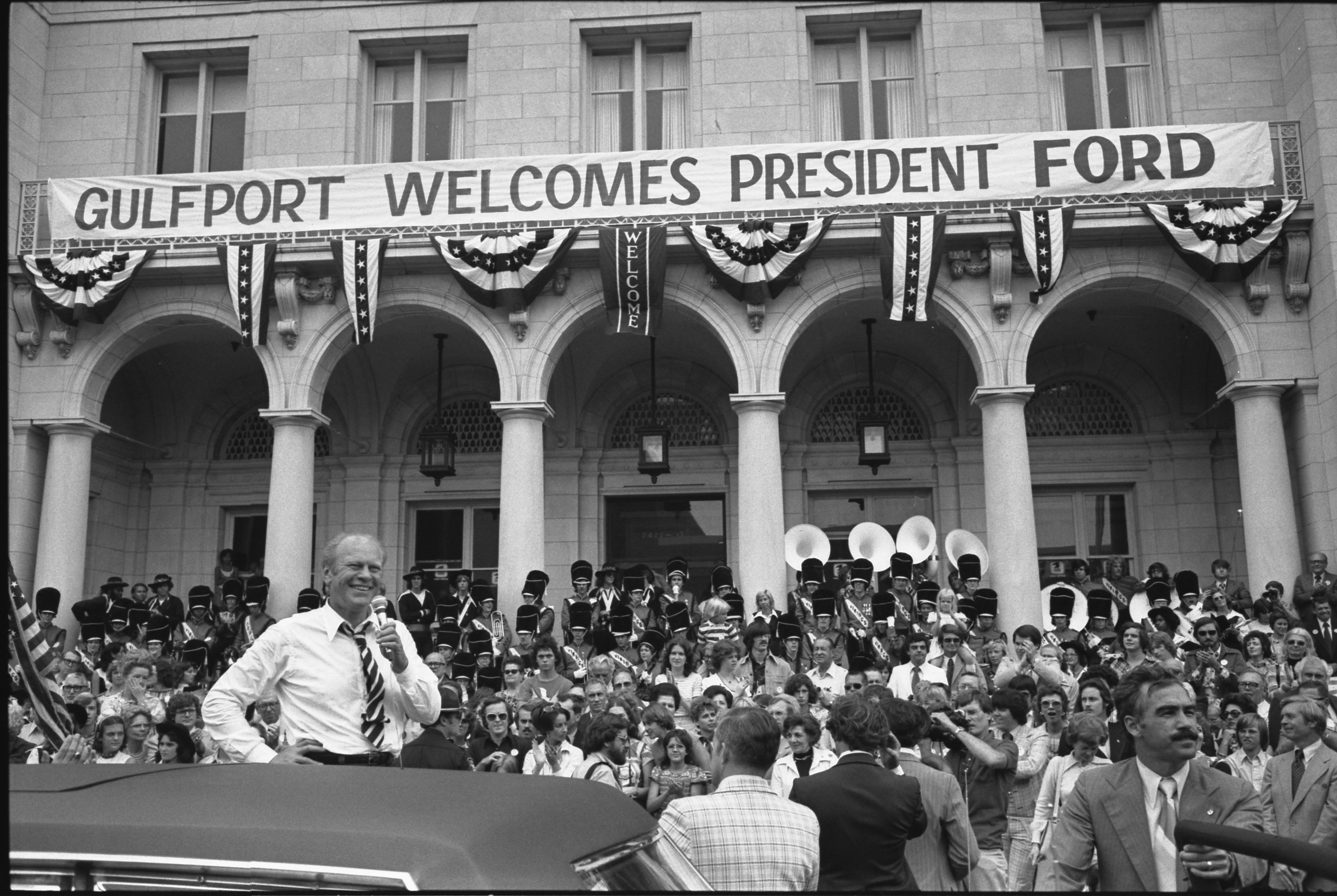
Gerald Ford campaigning in Gulfport, Mississippi

The 1976 United States presidential election in Mississippi was held on November 2, 1976. The Democratic Party candidate Jimmy Carter won the state of Mississippi. He narrowly won the state with 49.56% of the vote, and all seven of the state's electors were pledged to Carter.

In the 1972 election, Mississippi had Richard Nixon's strongest showing in the country, giving him 78% of the vote. Carter managed to carry Mississippi in 1976 by a slim margin of 1.88% against incumbent Republican President Gerald Ford. At that time, Carter’s performance in Mississippi was the narrowest victory for a post-Reconstruction Democratic presidential candidate, as he failed to win a majority of the vote. This was also only the second time since 1848 that the state was decided by a single-digit margin (the other being 1960).

While Carter performed well in northern Mississippi and in Black majority counties along the Mississippi River, President Ford’s wins in Hinds County (Jackson) and neighboring Rankin County, both of which were won with over sixty percent of the vote, along with a substantial win in Harrison County (Biloxi and Gulfport), kept the race in Mississippi extremely close.

As of the 2024 presidential election, this is the last time a Democrat won the state of Mississippi, as well as Hancock County, Neshoba County, DeSoto County, Carroll County, Covington County, Pearl River County, George County, Wayne County, Stone County, Greene County, Perry County, and Webster County.

Among white voters, 60% supported Ford while 36% supported Carter.

== Predictions ==
Source	Rating	As of
The Atlanta Constitution	Likely D (Flip)	September 13, 1976
Kansas City Times	Lean R	October 26, 1976
Daily News	Tossup	October 27, 1976
Sun Herald	Lean R	October 31, 1976
Austin American-Statesman	Lean R	October 31, 1976

== Results ==
1976 United States presidential election in Mississippi
Party	Candidate	Votes	Percentage	Electoral votes
Democratic	Jimmy Carter	381,309	49.56%	7
Republican	Gerald Ford (incumbent)	366,845	47.68%	0
Mississippi American	Thomas J. Anderson	6,678	0.87%	0
Independent	Lester Maddox	4,861	0.63%	0
Independent	Eugene McCarthy	4,074	0.53%	0
Independent	Peter Camejo	2,805	0.36%	0
Independent	Roger MacBride	2,787	0.36%	0
Totals		769,363	100.0%	7

=== Results by county ===
County	Jimmy Carter Democratic		Gerald Ford Republican		Thomas Anderson Mississippi American		Lester Maddox Independent		Eugene McCarthy Independent		Peter Camejo Independent		Roger MacBride Independent		Margin		Total votes cast
County	#	%	#	%	#	%	#	%	#	%	#	%	#	%	#	%	Total votes cast
Adams	6,619	47.75%	6,431	46.40%	80	0.58%	153	1.10%	56	0.40%	227	1.64%	295	2.13%	188	1.35%	13,861
Alcorn	6,995	64.95%	3,430	31.85%	96	0.89%	121	1.12%	59	0.55%	36	0.33%	33	0.31%	3,565	33.10%	10,770
Amite	2,574	51.49%	2,256	45.13%	61	1.22%	45	0.90%	20	0.40%	24	0.48%	19	0.38%	318	6.36%	4,999
Attala	4,068	54.80%	3,146	42.38%	64	0.86%	64	0.86%	35	0.47%	23	0.31%	23	0.31%	922	12.42%	7,423
Benton	2,375	74.01%	790	24.62%	25	0.78%	19	0.59%	0	0.00%	0	0.00%	0	0.00%	1,585	49.39%	3,209
Bolivar	7,561	58.73%	5,136	39.89%	102	0.79%	20	0.16%	31	0.24%	12	0.09%	13	0.10%	2,425	18.84%	12,875
Calhoun	2,724	56.89%	1,892	39.52%	70	1.46%	34	0.71%	24	0.50%	26	0.54%	18	0.38%	832	17.37%	4,788
Carroll	1,566	49.45%	1,561	49.29%	15	0.47%	13	0.41%	5	0.16%	3	0.09%	4	0.13%	5	0.16%	3,167
Chickasaw	2,891	50.52%	2,581	45.10%	66	1.15%	54	0.94%	47	0.82%	45	0.79%	39	0.68%	310	5.42%	5,723
Choctaw	1,520	47.93%	1,561	49.23%	36	1.14%	18	0.57%	17	0.54%	7	0.22%	12	0.38%	-41	-1.30%	3,171
Claiborne	2,657	68.98%	1,078	27.99%	36	0.93%	11	0.29%	23	0.60%	13	0.34%	34	0.88%	1,579	40.99%	3,852
Clarke	2,816	46.97%	2,935	48.96%	45	0.75%	66	1.10%	51	0.85%	41	0.68%	41	0.68%	-119	-1.99%	5,995
Clay	3,514	51.40%	3,017	44.13%	64	0.94%	79	1.16%	61	0.89%	55	0.80%	47	0.69%	497	7.27%	6,837
Coahoma	6,412	57.70%	4,269	38.41%	104	0.94%	109	0.98%	106	0.95%	63	0.57%	50	0.45%	2,143	19.29%	11,113
Copiah	4,267	49.35%	4,108	47.51%	68	0.79%	64	0.74%	43	0.50%	51	0.59%	45	0.52%	159	1.84%	8,646
Covington	2,862	51.40%	2,591	46.53%	33	0.59%	21	0.38%	23	0.41%	19	0.34%	19	0.34%	271	4.87%	5,568
DeSoto	7,756	54.19%	6,240	43.60%	78	0.54%	69	0.48%	88	0.61%	46	0.32%	35	0.24%	1,516	10.59%	14,312
Forrest	7,914	41.39%	10,770	56.33%	167	0.87%	93	0.49%	95	0.50%	42	0.22%	39	0.20%	-2,856	-14.94%	19,120
Franklin	1,578	46.48%	1,719	50.63%	29	0.85%	31	0.91%	17	0.50%	12	0.35%	9	0.27%	-141	-4.15%	3,395
George	3,072	58.75%	1,957	37.43%	56	1.07%	39	0.75%	44	0.84%	34	0.65%	27	0.52%	1,115	21.32%	5,229
Greene	2,127	56.42%	1,538	40.80%	16	0.42%	34	0.90%	17	0.45%	15	0.40%	23	0.61%	589	15.62%	3,770
Grenada	3,263	46.48%	3,569	50.84%	72	1.03%	25	0.36%	45	0.64%	29	0.41%	17	0.24%	-306	-4.36%	7,020
Hancock	3,855	49.16%	3,765	48.01%	47	0.60%	68	0.87%	44	0.56%	35	0.45%	28	0.36%	90	1.15%	7,842
Harrison	16,569	44.61%	19,207	51.72%	361	0.97%	328	0.88%	301	0.81%	207	0.56%	166	0.45%	-2,638	-7.11%	37,139
Hinds	28,748	37.95%	45,803	60.46%	415	0.55%	261	0.34%	270	0.36%	114	0.15%	145	0.19%	-17,055	-22.51%	75,756
Holmes	4,616	64.08%	2,438	33.85%	54	0.75%	37	0.51%	23	0.32%	15	0.21%	20	0.28%	2,178	30.23%	7,203
Humphreys	2,172	57.55%	1,445	38.29%	39	1.03%	37	0.98%	40	1.06%	20	0.53%	21	0.56%	727	19.26%	3,774
Issaquena	567	59.43%	325	34.07%	19	1.99%	17	1.78%	16	1.68%	8	0.84%	2	0.21%	242	25.36%	954
Itawamba	4,480	66.82%	2,153	32.11%	25	0.37%	10	0.15%	23	0.34%	6	0.09%	8	0.12%	2,327	34.71%	6,705
Jackson	12,533	40.32%	17,177	55.26%	332	1.07%	394	1.27%	248	0.80%	201	0.65%	197	0.63%	-4,644	-14.94%	31,082
Jasper	3,109	56.39%	2,356	42.74%	28	0.51%	12	0.22%	4	0.07%	2	0.04%	2	0.04%	753	13.65%	5,513
Jefferson	2,562	74.78%	782	22.83%	21	0.61%	18	0.53%	19	0.55%	11	0.32%	13	0.38%	1,780	51.95%	3,426
Jefferson Davis	2,747	58.47%	1,868	39.76%	25	0.53%	13	0.28%	13	0.28%	15	0.32%	17	0.36%	879	18.71%	4,698
Jones	10,139	47.04%	11,098	51.49%	102	0.47%	81	0.38%	63	0.29%	28	0.13%	41	0.19%	-959	-4.45%	21,552
Kemper	2,436	58.56%	1,680	40.38%	23	0.55%	14	0.34%	4	0.10%	3	0.07%	0	0.00%	756	18.18%	4,160
Lafayette	4,375	52.39%	3,735	44.73%	57	0.68%	58	0.69%	64	0.77%	40	0.48%	22	0.26%	640	7.66%	8,351
Lamar	3,109	41.93%	4,056	54.71%	97	1.31%	89	1.20%	35	0.47%	7	0.09%	21	0.28%	-947	-12.78%	7,414
Lauderdale	9,813	40.14%	14,273	58.39%	131	0.54%	134	0.55%	45	0.18%	17	0.07%	33	0.13%	-4,460	-18.25%	24,446
Lawrence	2,242	50.54%	2,109	47.54%	33	0.74%	19	0.43%	16	0.36%	7	0.16%	10	0.23%	133	3.00%	4,436
Leake	3,415	52.47%	2,952	45.36%	39	0.60%	33	0.51%	27	0.41%	29	0.45%	13	0.20%	463	7.11%	6,508
Lee	8,504	52.07%	7,366	45.10%	229	1.40%	49	0.30%	109	0.67%	52	0.32%	24	0.15%	1,138	6.97%	16,333
Leflore	6,135	48.73%	5,872	46.64%	255	2.03%	74	0.59%	129	1.02%	85	0.68%	39	0.31%	263	2.09%	12,589
Lincoln	4,043	38.90%	6,084	58.55%	72	0.69%	85	0.82%	47	0.45%	37	0.36%	24	0.23%	-2,041	-19.65%	10,392
Lowndes	6,181	42.05%	8,003	54.44%	275	1.87%	68	0.46%	63	0.43%	55	0.37%	55	0.37%	-1,822	-12.39%	14,700
Madison	6,240	55.14%	4,838	42.75%	120	1.06%	50	0.44%	31	0.27%	9	0.08%	28	0.25%	1,402	12.39%	11,316
Marion	5,283	49.20%	5,300	49.36%	66	0.61%	28	0.26%	23	0.21%	17	0.16%	20	0.19%	-17	-0.16%	10,737
Marshall	6,769	73.37%	2,242	24.30%	49	0.53%	47	0.51%	50	0.54%	31	0.34%	38	0.41%	4,527	49.07%	9,226
Monroe	6,097	54.27%	4,737	42.17%	100	0.89%	75	0.67%	91	0.81%	68	0.61%	66	0.59%	1,360	12.10%	11,234
Montgomery	2,410	49.93%	2,278	47.19%	42	0.87%	32	0.66%	33	0.68%	17	0.35%	15	0.31%	132	2.74%	4,827
Neshoba	3,891	49.76%	3,859	49.35%	25	0.32%	23	0.29%	8	0.10%	5	0.06%	8	0.10%	32	0.41%	7,819
Newton	2,741	40.97%	3,813	57.00%	114	1.70%	8	0.12%	8	0.12%	3	0.04%	3	0.04%	-1,072	-16.03%	6,690
Noxubee	2,121	51.28%	1,860	44.97%	45	1.09%	39	0.94%	36	0.87%	26	0.63%	9	0.22%	261	6.31%	4,136
Oktibbeha	4,339	44.62%	5,194	53.41%	61	0.63%	27	0.28%	46	0.47%	20	0.21%	38	0.39%	-855	-8.79%	9,725
Panola	5,517	60.85%	3,341	36.85%	70	0.77%	35	0.39%	45	0.50%	31	0.34%	28	0.31%	2,176	24.00%	9,067
Pearl River	5,024	51.98%	4,332	44.82%	56	0.58%	105	1.09%	74	0.77%	32	0.33%	42	0.43%	692	7.16%	9,665
Perry	1,965	52.75%	1,527	40.99%	112	3.01%	39	1.05%	38	1.02%	24	0.64%	20	0.54%	438	11.76%	3,725
Pike	5,749	48.92%	5,659	48.16%	109	0.93%	103	0.88%	54	0.46%	28	0.24%	49	0.42%	90	0.76%	11,751
Pontotoc	4,066	62.64%	2,245	34.59%	77	1.19%	31	0.48%	26	0.40%	18	0.28%	28	0.43%	1,821	28.05%	6,491
Prentiss	4,431	63.51%	2,362	33.85%	44	0.63%	42	0.60%	46	0.66%	29	0.42%	23	0.33%	2,069	29.66%	6,977
Quitman	2,621	64.80%	1,287	31.82%	34	0.84%	25	0.62%	30	0.74%	23	0.57%	25	0.62%	1,334	32.98%	4,045
Rankin	6,937	36.75%	11,507	60.95%	133	0.70%	125	0.66%	83	0.44%	54	0.29%	39	0.21%	-4,570	-24.20%	18,878
Scott	3,643	48.78%	3,649	48.86%	61	0.82%	59	0.79%	25	0.33%	14	0.19%	17	0.23%	-6	-0.08%	7,468
Sharkey	1,283	52.39%	1,024	41.81%	43	1.76%	23	0.94%	33	1.35%	21	0.86%	22	0.90%	259	10.58%	2,449
Simpson	3,600	45.23%	4,291	53.91%	33	0.41%	22	0.28%	11	0.14%	1	0.01%	2	0.03%	-691	-8.68%	7,960
Smith	2,434	42.35%	3,147	54.75%	32	0.56%	53	0.92%	32	0.56%	20	0.35%	30	0.52%	-713	-12.40%	5,748
Stone	1,648	50.27%	1,575	48.05%	26	0.79%	9	0.27%	5	0.15%	1	0.03%	14	0.43%	73	2.22%	3,278
Sunflower	4,322	53.86%	3,456	43.07%	69	0.86%	46	0.57%	49	0.61%	47	0.59%	35	0.44%	866	10.79%	8,024
Tallahatchie	2,991	56.95%	2,146	40.86%	37	0.70%	29	0.55%	20	0.38%	17	0.32%	12	0.23%	845	16.09%	5,252
Tate	3,747	58.22%	2,497	38.80%	51	0.79%	57	0.89%	40	0.62%	20	0.31%	24	0.37%	1,250	19.42%	6,436
Tippah	4,260	67.90%	1,887	30.08%	47	0.75%	26	0.41%	25	0.40%	15	0.24%	14	0.22%	2,373	37.82%	6,274
Tishomingo	3,734	63.95%	1,969	33.72%	53	0.91%	28	0.48%	20	0.34%	20	0.34%	15	0.26%	1,765	30.23%	5,839
Tunica	1,695	61.50%	951	34.51%	23	0.83%	24	0.87%	33	1.20%	17	0.62%	13	0.47%	744	26.99%	2,756
Union	5,021	65.56%	2,507	32.73%	52	0.68%	38	0.50%	20	0.26%	9	0.12%	12	0.16%	2,514	32.83%	7,659
Walthall	2,650	53.79%	2,110	42.83%	50	1.01%	40	0.81%	44	0.89%	23	0.47%	10	0.20%	540	10.96%	4,927
Warren	6,299	40.11%	8,699	55.39%	231	1.47%	144	0.92%	152	0.97%	100	0.64%	80	0.51%	-2,400	-15.28%	15,705
Washington	9,650	53.17%	7,474	41.18%	346	1.91%	153	0.84%	222	1.22%	136	0.75%	168	0.93%	2,176	11.99%	18,149
Wayne	3,306	51.48%	3,022	47.06%	14	0.22%	36	0.56%	10	0.16%	13	0.20%	21	0.33%	284	4.42%	6,422
Webster	2,218	51.81%	1,943	45.39%	44	1.03%	37	0.86%	15	0.35%	11	0.26%	13	0.30%	275	6.42%	4,281
Wilkinson	2,514	65.38%	1,273	33.11%	16	0.42%	13	0.34%	11	0.29%	7	0.18%	11	0.29%	1,241	32.27%	3,845
Winston	3,956	50.77%	3,659	46.96%	60	0.77%	34	0.44%	37	0.47%	28	0.36%	18	0.23%	297	3.81%	7,792
Yalobusha	2,603	57.81%	1,808	40.15%	32	0.71%	30	0.67%	7	0.16%	14	0.31%	9	0.20%	795	17.66%	4,503
Yazoo	4,053	47.85%	4,255	50.23%	42	0.50%	45	0.53%	31	0.37%	19	0.22%	26	0.31%	-202	-2.38%	8,471
Totals	381,309	49.56%	366,846	47.68%	6,678	0.87%	4,861	0.63%	4,074	0.53%	2,805	0.36%	2,787	0.36%	14,463	1.88%	769,360

==== Counties that flipped from Republican to Democratic ====
- Adams
- Bolivar
- Carroll
- Coahoma
- Covington
- Desoto
- George
- Greene
- Hancock
- Humphreys
- Marshall
- Lawrence
- Neshoba
- Noxubee
- Quitman
- Sharkey
- Pearl River
- Perry
- Stone
- Tunica
- Wilkinson
- Wayne
- Webster
- Alcorn
- Amite
- Attala
- Benton
- Calhoun
- Chickasaw
- Clarke
- Clay
- Copiah
- Issaquena
- Itawamba
- Jasper
- Jefferson Davis
- Kemper
- Lafayette
- Leake
- Lee
- Leflore
- Madison
- Monroe
- Montgomery
- Panola
- Pike
- Pontotoc
- Prentiss
- Sunflower
- Tallahatchie
- Tate
- Tippah
- Tishomingo
- Union
- Walthall
- Washington
- Yalobusha
- Winston

=== Results by congressional district ===
Despite winning the state, Carter only won 2 of five congressional districts, while Ford won the other three, including one held by a Democrat.

District	Carter	Ford	Representative
1st	61.7%	38.3%	Jamie Whitten
2nd	52.9%	47.1%	David R. Bowen
3rd	48.9%	51.1%	Sonny Montgomery
4th	45.0%	55.0%	Thad Cochran
5th	47.1%	52.9%	Trent Lott

== Works cited ==
- Black, Earl; Black, Merle (1992). The Vital South: How Presidents Are Elected. Harvard University Press. ISBN 0674941306.
