= Carolyn Haines =

American writer

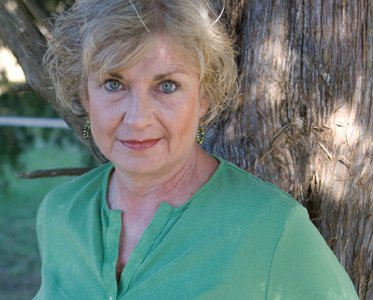
- Carolyn Haines, 2012
- Born: Carolyn Haines; May 12, 1953 (age 73); Lucedale, Mississippi, U.S.
- Education: University of Southern Mississippi; University of South Alabama
- Occupation: Novelist
- Writing career
- Pen name: Carolyn Haines; R.B. Chesterton; Caroline Burnes; Lizzie Hart
- Period: 1988–present
- Genres: suspense, horror
- Website: www.carolynhaines.com

Carolyn Haines (born May 12, 1953, in Hattiesburg, Mississippi), who uses the pseudonyms R.B. Chesterton, Caroline Burnes, and Lizzie Hart, is a prolific mystery author and former journalist specializing in mysteries set in the Mississippi Delta.

== Biography ==
Haines is the daughter of Roy and Hilda Haines, both journalists. Haines grew up in Lucedale, Mississippi, and graduated from high school there in 1971. She received a bachelor's degree in journalism from the University of Southern Mississippi in 1974 and a master's degree in creative writing from the University of South Alabama in 1985. For over ten years she was a reporter and journalist for newspapers such as the George County Times, the Mobile Press-Register, The Mississippi Press, The Huntsville Times, and the Hattiesburg American.

Her current mysteries are the Sarah Booth Delaney Mississippi Delta series, set in the fictional town of Zinnia. The humorous series has won numerous accolades, including Best Amateur Sleuth. "Hallowed Bones," the fifth in the series, was named in the top five mysteries of 2004 by Library Journal.

Haines also writes darker crime novels and general fiction. "Penumbra" was named one of the top five mysteries of 2006 by Library Journal. She has written under the pseudonyms Caroline Burnes in romantic mysteries, and Lizzie Hart in humor.

She taught the graduate and undergraduate fiction writing classes at the University of South Alabama, where she was an assistant professor and Fiction Coordinator.

== Awards & praise ==
- 2010 Harper Lee Award winner for Alabama's Distinguished Writer of the Year
- Received Alabama State Council on the Arts literary fellowship for her writing
- 2009 Richard Wright Award for Literary Excellence

== Bibliography ==
=== As herself ===
==== The Sarah Booth Delaney Mysteries ====
1. Them Bones. Bantam. 1999. ISBN 978-0-553-58171-3.
2. Buried Bones. Bantam. 2000. ISBN 978-0-553-58172-0.
3. Splintered Bones. Dell. 2003. ISBN 978-0-440-23721-1.
4. Crossed Bones. Dell. 2004. ISBN 978-0-440-24093-8.
5. Hallowed Bones. Dell. 2005. ISBN 978-0-440-24131-7.
6. Bones to Pick. Kensington. 2006. ISBN 978-0-7582-1091-3.
7. Ham Bones. Kensington. 2007. ISBN 978-0-7582-1092-0.
8. Wishbones. Minotaur Books. 2008. ISBN 978-0-312-37708-3.
9. Greedy Bones. Minotaur Books. 2009. ISBN 978-0-312-37710-6.
10. Bone Appétit. Minotaur Books. 2010. ISBN 978-0-312-59464-0.
11. Bones of a Feather. Minotaur Books. 2011. ISBN 978-0-312-59502-9.
12. Bonefire of the Vanities. Minotaur Books. 2012. ISBN 978-0-312-64187-0.
13. Smarty Bones. Minotaur Books. 2013. ISBN 978-0-312-64188-7.
14. Booty Bones. Minotaur Books. 2014. ISBN 978-1-250-04613-0.
15. Bone to Be Wild. Minotaur Books. 2015. ISBN 978-1-250-04614-7.
16. Rock-a-Bye Bones. Minotaur Books. 2016. ISBN 978-1-250-08516-0.
17. Sticks and Bones. Minotaur Books. 2017. ISBN 978-1-250-08526-9.
18. Charmed Bones. Minotaur Books. 2018. ISBN 978-1-250-15413-2.
19. A Gift of Bones. Minotaur Books. 2018. ISBN 978-1-250-19362-9.
20. Game of Bones. Minotaur Books. 2019. ISBN 978-1-250-15415-6.
21. The Devil's Bones. Minotaur Books. 2020. ISBN 978-1-250-25786-4.
22. A Garland of Bones. Minotaur Books. 2020. ISBN 978-1-250-25792-5.
23. Independent Bones. Minotaur Books. 2021. ISBN 978-1-250-25787-1.
24. Lady of Bones. Minotaur Books. 2022. ISBN 978-1-250-83372-3.
25. Bones of Holly. Minotaur Books. 2022. ISBN 9781250833754.

==== Sarah Booth Delaney Short Stories ====
- "Bones on the Bayou" (2014)
- "Shorty Bones" (2014)
- "Guru Bones" (2015)
- "Jingle Bones" (2015)
- "Bones and Arrows" (2016)
- "Clacking Bones" (2018 - novella)
- "Enchanted Bones" (2020)

==== The Jexville Chronicles ====
1. Summer of the Redeemers (1994)
2. Touched (1996)
3. Judas Burning (2005)

==== Non-series ====
1. Deception (2012)
2. Skin Dancer (2011)
3. Fever Moon (2007)
4. Revenant (2007)
5. Penumbra (2006)
6. My Mother's Witness: The Peggy Morgan Story (2003)

==== Short stories ====
- "The Christmas Ornament" in Haunted Holidays: Three Short Tales of Horror (2014)
- "The Sugar Cure" in Delta Blues (2010)
- "Ode to the Fruitcake" in Christmas Memories from Mississippi (2010)
- "The Cypress Dream" in Florida Heat Wave (2010)
- "Neighborhood Watch" in Damn Near Dead II (2010)
- "The Wish" in Many Bloody Returns (2009)
- "Carolyn Haines" in Growing Up in Mississippi (2008)

=== As Caroline Burnes ===
==== Fear Familiar ====
1. Fear Familiar (1990)
2. Too Familiar (1993)
3. Thrice Familiar (1993)
4. Shades of Familiar (1994)
5. Familiar Remedy (1994)
6. Familiar Tale (1995)
7. Bewitching Familiar (1995)
8. Familiar Heart (1997)
9. Familiar Fire (1998)
10. Familiar Valentine (1999)
11. Familiar Stranger(1999) in After Dark
12. Familiar Christmas (1999)
13. Familiar Obsession (2000)
14. Familiar Lullaby (2001)
15. Familiar Mirage (2002)
16. Familiar Oasis (2002)
17. Familiar Texas (2005)
18. Familiar Escape (2006)
19. Familiar Vows (2008)
20. Familiar Showdown (2009)

==== Legend of Blackthorn ====
1. Babe in the Woods (2003)
2. Rider in the Mist (2003)

==== Non-series ====
1. Phantom Filly (1989)
2. The Jaguar's Eye (1990)
3. Fatal Ingredients (1992)
4. Hoodwinked (1993)
5. Cutting Edge (1994)
6. Texas Midnight (2000)
7. Midnight Burning (2001)

=== As editor ===
1. Delta Blues (2010)

=== As R.B. Chesterton ===
1. The Darkling. Pegasus. 2013. ISBN 978-1-60598-458-2.
2. The Seeker. Pegasus. 2014. ISBN 978-1-60598-500-8.

==== Short stories ====
- "The Hanged Man" (2015 - novella)
