= 1932 United States presidential election in Mississippi =

- November 8, 1932

All 9 Mississippi votes to the Electoral College

Nominee	Franklin D. Roosevelt	Herbert Hoover
Party	Democratic	Republican
Home state	New York	California
Running mate	John Nance Garner	Charles Curtis
Electoral vote	9	0
Popular vote	140,168	5,180
Percentage	95.98%	3.55%
County results
Roosevelt
70–80%
80–90%
90–100%
President before election
Herbert Hoover
Republican
Elected President
Franklin D. Roosevelt
Democratic

The 1932 United States presidential election in Mississippi took place on November 8, 1932, as part of the 1932 United States presidential election. Mississippi voters chose nine representatives, or electors, to the Electoral College, who voted for president and vice president.

Mississippi was won by Governor Franklin D. Roosevelt (D–New York), running with Speaker John Nance Garner, with 95.98% of the popular vote, against incumbent President Herbert Hoover (R–California), running with Vice President Charles Curtis, with 3.55% of the popular vote.

By percentage of the popular vote won, Mississippi was Roosevelt's second-best state; the only state in which he performed better was South Carolina, where he won 98.03% of the popular vote.

== Results ==
1932 United States presidential election in Mississippi
Party	Candidate	Votes	%
Democratic	Franklin D. Roosevelt	140,168	95.98%
Republican	Herbert Hoover (inc.)	5,180	3.55%
Socialist	Norman Thomas	686	0.47%
Total votes		146,034	100%

=== Counties that flipped from Republican to Democratic ===
- Pearl River
- Stone
- George
