= New Augusta, Mississippi =

- Town
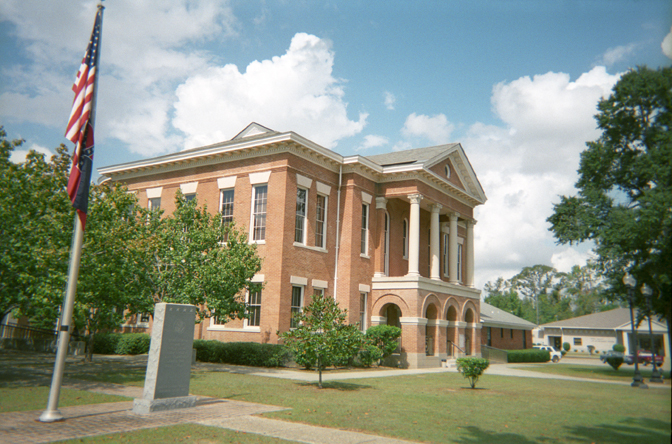
- Perry County Courthouse in New Augusta

- Flag

- Location of New Augusta, Mississippi

- Location in the United States
- Coordinates: 31°12′15″N 89°1′55″W
- Country: United States
- State: Mississippi
- County: Perry

Area
  - Total: 5.34 sq mi (13.82 km^{2})
  - Land: 5.14 sq mi (13.32 km^{2})
  - Water: 0.19 sq mi (0.50 km^{2})
- Elevation: 112 ft (34 m)

Population (2020)
  - Total: 554
  - Density: 107.7/sq mi (41.58/km^{2})
- Time zone: UTC-6 (Central (CST))
  - Summer (DST): UTC-5 (CDT)
- ZIP code: 39462
- Area code: 601
- FIPS code: 28-51040
- GNIS feature ID: 0694154

New Augusta is a town in Perry County, Mississippi. It is part of the Hattiesburg, Mississippi Metropolitan Statistical Area. The population was 554 at the 2020 census. It is the county seat of Perry County. New Augusta is located about two miles south of "Old" Augusta, which was the county seat until 1906.

== Geography ==
New Augusta is located at 31°12′15″N 89°1′55″W (31.204062, -89.031957).

According to the United States Census Bureau, the town has a total area of 5.3 square miles (14 km^{2}), of which 5.2 square miles (13 km^{2}) is land and 0.1 square miles (0.26 km^{2}) (2.64%) is water.

== Demographics ==
Historical population
Census	Pop.	Note	%±
1870	80		—
1960	275		—
1970	511		85.8%
1980	589		15.3%
1990	668		13.4%
2000	715		7.0%
2010	644		−9.9%
2020	554		−14.0%
U.S. Decennial Census

New Augusta racial composition as of 2020
Race	Num.	Perc.
White (non-Hispanic)	302	54.51%
Black or African American (non-Hispanic)	222	40.07%
Native American	2	0.36%
Pacific Islander	1	0.18%
Other/Mixed	17	3.07%
Hispanic or Latino	10	1.81%

As of the 2020 United States census, there were 554 people, 238 households, and 165 families residing in the town.

== Education ==
The Town of New Augusta is served by the Perry County School District.

The county is in the zone for Jones College.

== Notable person ==
- Dale Goodin, member of the Mississippi House of Representatives from 2020 to 2024

== See also ==
- Mahned Bridge
- James Copeland (outlaw)
