= Brandon Sumrall =

American football player (born 1986)

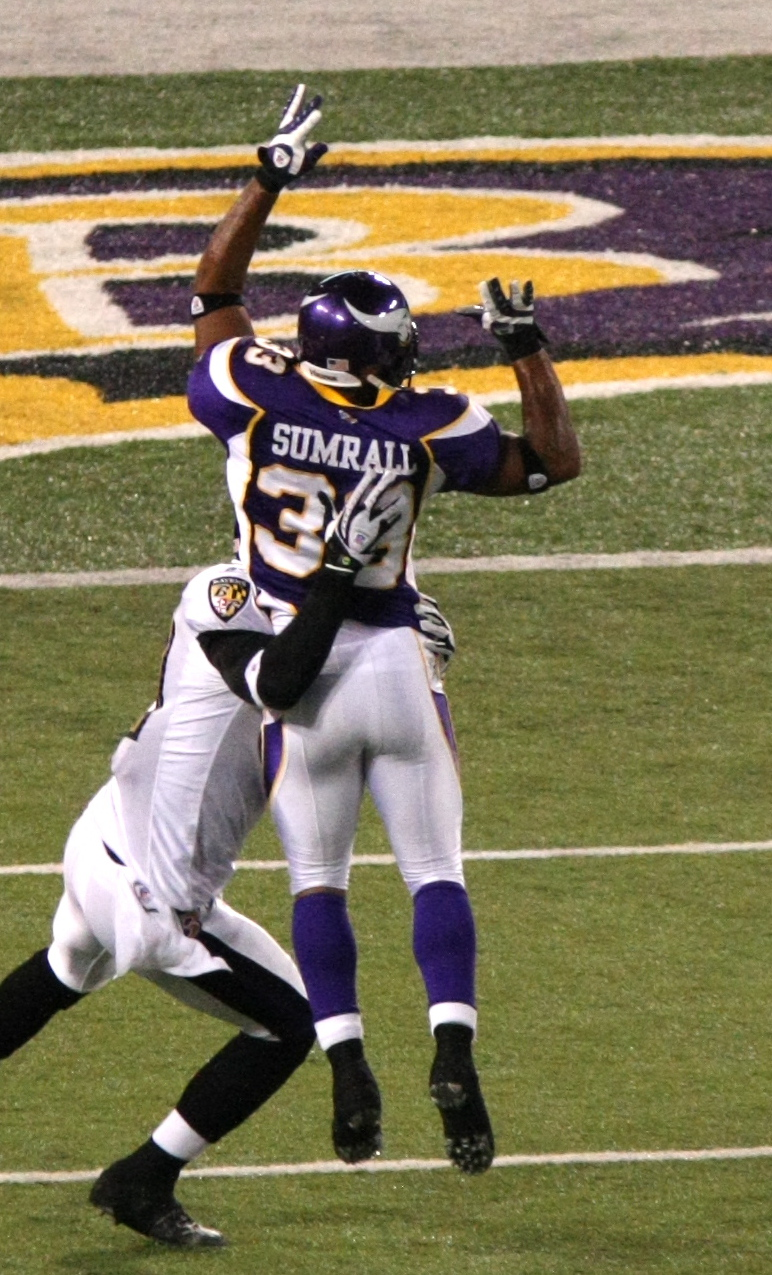
- Sumrall with the Minnesota Vikings in 2008

No. 20, 33
- Position: Cornerback

Personal information
- Born: July 15, 1986 (age 40); Beaumont, Mississippi, U.S.
- Listed height: 5 ft 10 in (1.78 m)
- Listed weight: 193 lb (88 kg)

Career information
- College: Southern Mississippi
- NFL draft: 2008: undrafted

Career history
- Minnesota Vikings (2008)*; Tampa Bay Buccaneers (2008)*; Indianapolis Colts (2008–2009)*; New York Giants (2009)*; Las Vegas Locomotives (2009–2011)
- * Offseason or practice squad member only

Awards and highlights
- UFL champion (2010)

Brandon Sumrall (born July 15, 1986) is an American former football cornerback. He was signed by the Minnesota Vikings as an undrafted free agent in 2008. He played college football at Southern Mississippi.

Sumrall was also a member of the Tampa Bay Buccaneers, Indianapolis Colts, and New York Giants of the NFL, and the Las Vegas Locomotives of the United Football League.
