= Leaf River Wildlife Management Area =

Protected area in Mississippi, United States

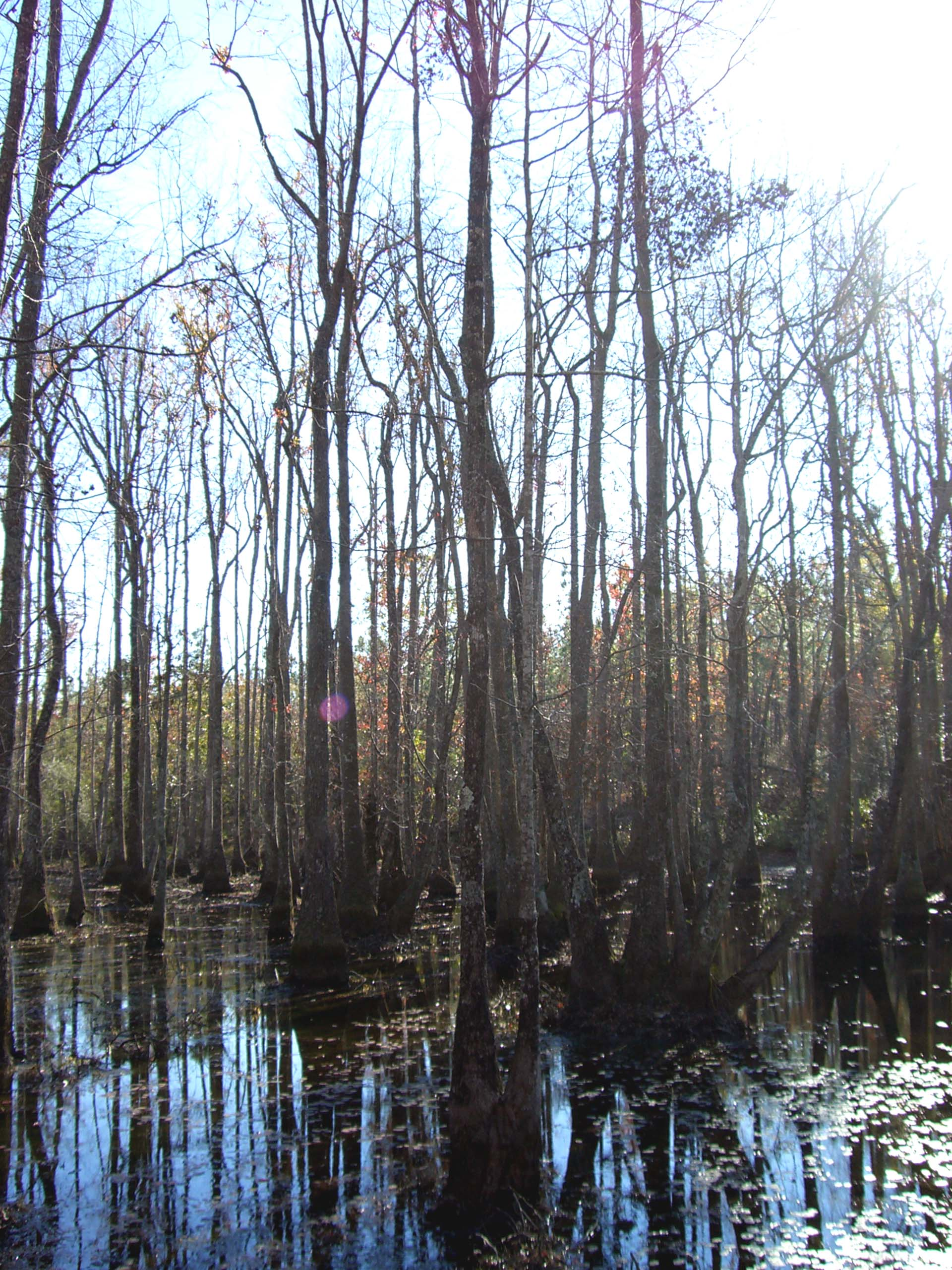
A view from Leaf River Wildlife Management Area east of Wiggins, Mississippi.

Leaf River Wildlife Management Area was established in 1940 out of land owned by the U.S. Forest Service. Located within the De Soto National Forest off Mississippi Highway 26 and east of Wiggins, Mississippi, it is composed of approximately 42,000 acres (170 km^{2}) of pine forest.

== Leaf Wilderness ==
In 1984, 994 acres (4 km^{2}) of the Leaf River Wildlife Management Area in southwestern Greene County 31°00′58″N 88°46′51″W were designated wilderness. Almost the entire Leaf Wilderness consists of meandering sloughs, oxbow lakes, and spruce-pine forest or oak-gum-cypress river bottom. Loblolly and shortleaf pines are found in abundance, with a dense understory of dogwood, redbud, persimmon, blueberry, honeysuckle, and poison oak. Common wildlife include white-tailed deer and wild turkey.

== See also ==
- List of U.S. Wilderness Areas
- Wilderness Act
