= James Copeland (outlaw) =

American outlaw (1823–1857)

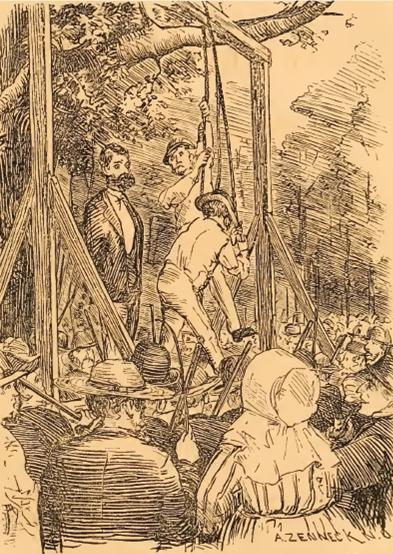
- The execution of James Copeland.
- Born: January 18, 1823; Jackson County, Mississippi
- Died: October 30, 1857 (aged 34); Augusta, Perry County, Mississippi
- Resting place: Buried on the banks of the Leaf River, near Augusta, Mississippi, later body stolen
- Occupations: outlaw, hog thief, horse thief, slave-stealer, smuggler, pirate, counterfeiter, burglar, looter, arsonist, murderer, criminal gang leader
- Parent(s): Father: Isham Copeland; Mother: Rebecca Wells Copeland

Wages and Copeland Clan
- Founded: 1830s
- Founded by: Gale H. Wages, Charles "Preacher" McGrath, and James Copeland
- Founding location: Mobile, Mobile County, Alabama
- Years active: 1830s-1857
- Territory: Southern Mississippi and southern Alabama (around Mobile, Mobile County, Alabama)
- Ethnicity: European-American
- Membership (est.): 60
- Criminal activities: hog thievery, horse thievery, slave-stealing, smuggling, piracy, counterfeiting, burglary, looting, arson, murder

James Copeland (January 18, 1823 – October 30, 1857) was an American outlaw during the early to mid nineteenth century, whose crimes took place mostly in southern Mississippi and southern Alabama. He was born in Jackson County, Mississippi. He was the co-leader of a gang known as the Wages and Copeland Clan. On October 30, 1857, Copeland was executed by hanging in Perry County, Mississippi.

== Early life ==
Born on January 18, 1823, in Jackson County, Mississippi, to Isham Copeland and Rebecca Wells, James Copeland began school at approximately age ten or eleven. Although his father was willing to put him through school for as long as James desired, he began associating with people who taught him fraud and how to cheat and steal. It was reported that he would often trick his schoolmates out of their money and pocket knives.

James Copeland himself once said, his first great theft was a valuable pocket knife of a neighbor, whom he tricked out of it. He did this when he was twelve, although he stated he stole from his schoolmates long before this. His next great theft was when he was fourteen. He and his brother, Isham, nicknamed Whinn, went out for a night claiming they were going hunting. Instead, they stole fifteen hogs from a person nearby and went to Mobile to sell them for the sum of $30. He later went back to that person's house and tried to steal more hogs, but he was caught and arrested by the Jackson County Sheriff and charged with larceny. Realizing that the lawyer Copeland's father had hired would not prevent incarceration, Copeland's mother contacted Gale H. Wages, a notorious thief from Mobile. Wages first considered waylaying and killing the witness to the hog theft but settled on destroying the evidence instead. Wages and James Copeland burned the Jackson County Courthouse to the ground one night, destroying evidence and everything else housed in the building.

Still a teenager, Copeland joined with the Mobile bandits led by Wages and Charles "Preacher" McGrath. Wages took Copeland to a gathering in Mobile, where he was initiated as a member of a large clan that engaged in theft and other crimes for profit. He took the clan's oath: "You solemnly swear upon the Holy Evangelist of Almighty God, that you will never divulge, and always conceal and never reveal any of the signs or passwords of our order; that you will not invent any sign, token or device by which the secret mysteries of our order may be known; that you will not in any way betray or cause to be betrayed any member of this order — the whole under pain of having your head severed from your body — so help you God."

Copeland learned the secret codes and alphabet of the clan, and he eventually brought four of his brothers into the clan. The clan's criminal activities consisted primarily of the theft of Negro slaves and horses, the looting and burning of houses and stores, counterfeiting, boat larceny, and murder.

Copeland knew of water hideouts and boat slips as well as he knew the land. He and his gang burned parts of Mobile, sacked it then disappeared into Mobile Bay. Copeland set fire to the West Side of Mobile and while the citizens were braving the flames to save what they could, the gang looted the East side. After things cooled down, Copeland set fire to the East side and sacked the West side of the port city. Each time, the raiders loaded boats with their plunder and disappeared into the dark waters of Mobile Bay.

== The gang ==
The reported 60 members of the Wages and Copeland Clan were as follows:

- J. Alfred
- J. Baker
- J. Bowings
- A. Brown
- D. Brown
- W. Brown
- G. Buskings
- J. Butler
- R. Cable
- G. Clealand
- Henry Copeland
- John Copeland
- T. Copeland
- William Copeland
- G. Daniels
- J. Dewit
- D. Doty
- J. Doty
- J. Elva
- J. Gillet
- J. Harden
- S. Harden
- J. Harper
- J. Harper (see note)
- J. Hevard
- Thomas Hix
- W. P. Hobs
- J. Hopkins
- J. Kelly
- C. H. McGraffin
- Charles McGrath
- N. McIntosh
- W. W. Moore
- ___ Moulton
- E. Myrick
- ___ Overall
- J. Pool
- J. Porter
- T. Powell
- W. W. Ratlief
- W. Ross
- W. Sanferd
- H. Sanford
- E. Sharpor
- S. S. Shoemake
- S. Teapark
- J. Taylor
- G. H. Wages
- J. Walter
- J. Waters Jr.
- A. Watson
- G. Welter
- J. Welter
- J. W. Wesley
- W. C. Whelps
- J. Whitfield
- J. Whitlom
- Jasper Whitlow
- J. F. Wright
- G. Young

Note: Initials of Moulton and Overall were omitted because of doubts about who Copeland referred to. Two Gang members had the same initials.

== Later years ==
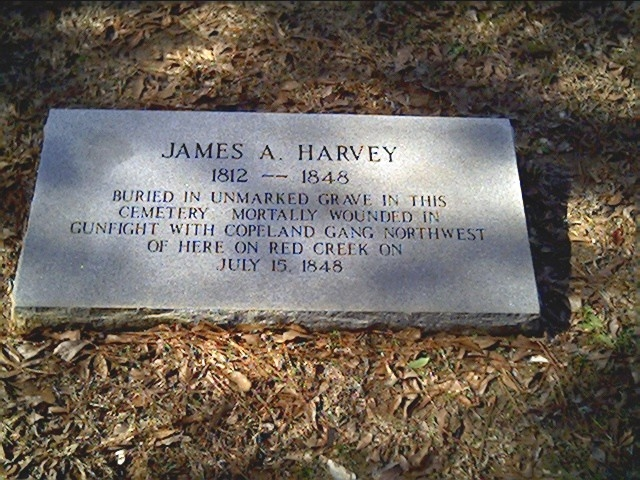
James A. Harvey cenotaph in Dale Cemetery, Stone County, Mississippi.

Wages and McGrath attempted to collect a disputed debt for fellow clan member Allen Brown. James Andrew Harvey had purchased, in good faith, a farm from Brown, who did not hold clear title to the property. Unable to establish ownership, Harvey refused to pay the outstanding debt. Brown passed the loan along to Wages, who was to either collect the money or kill Harvey. However, Harvey killed Wages and McGrath.

On July 15, 1848, James Copeland and his gang rode to James Harvey's home on Red Creek in Perry County (now Forrest County), Mississippi. They had been offered one-thousand dollars by Wages' father, to avenge his son's death. Here, the Copeland clan fought a blazing gun battle, which resulted in the death of Harvey and one of Copeland's men. Friends carried the mortally wounded Harvey to John Dale's home in northwestern Harrison County (now Stone County), where he died several days later and was buried in the nearby Dale Cemetery. In 1974, Harvey's remains were exhumed and reinterred in Pearl River County, Mississippi.

== Imprisonment and later execution ==
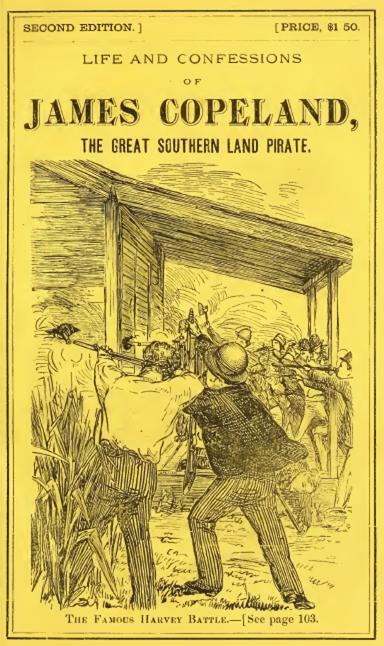
Cover of Pitts' 1874 book on the life of James Copeland depicting "The Famous Harvey Battle".

Although Copeland escaped the gun battle, he was eventually captured near Mobile in 1849, tried for his Alabama crimes, and sentenced to a four-year prison term. Upon completion of the prison term, Copeland was transferred to Mississippi to stand trial for the Harvey killing, for which he was convicted and sentenced to hang. Before his death on the gallows in 1857, Copeland made a full confession to Sheriff J.R.S. Pitts in Perry County, Mississippi, naming each member of the clan. Many clan members were prominent citizens of Mobile and the surrounding area.

== Burial, grave robbing, and public display ==
Copeland's body was buried on the banks of the Leaf River near Augusta, Mississippi. After two or three days, the body disappeared, however and a skeleton was purportedly made of his remains. The skeleton was allegedly exhibited at McInnis and Dozier Drugstore in Hattiesburg, Mississippi in the late 19th century. In the early 1900s, the skeleton vanished and has never been seen again.

== Copeland treasure ==
Copeland detailed how his clan had buried some $30,000 in gold in a swamp near Mobile and later reburied the treasure in the Catahoula Swamp of Hancock County, Mississippi. Rumors have circulated for decades of Copeland gold caches, still unclaimed, hidden around the shores of the Gulf of Mexico. The James Copeland legend lives today, as treasure hunters search sections of the Mississippi Gulf Coast for burial sites of the Copeland gang's ill-gotten gains.

== See also ==
- John Murrell (bandit)
