= De Soto National Forest =

Protected area in Mississippi, United States

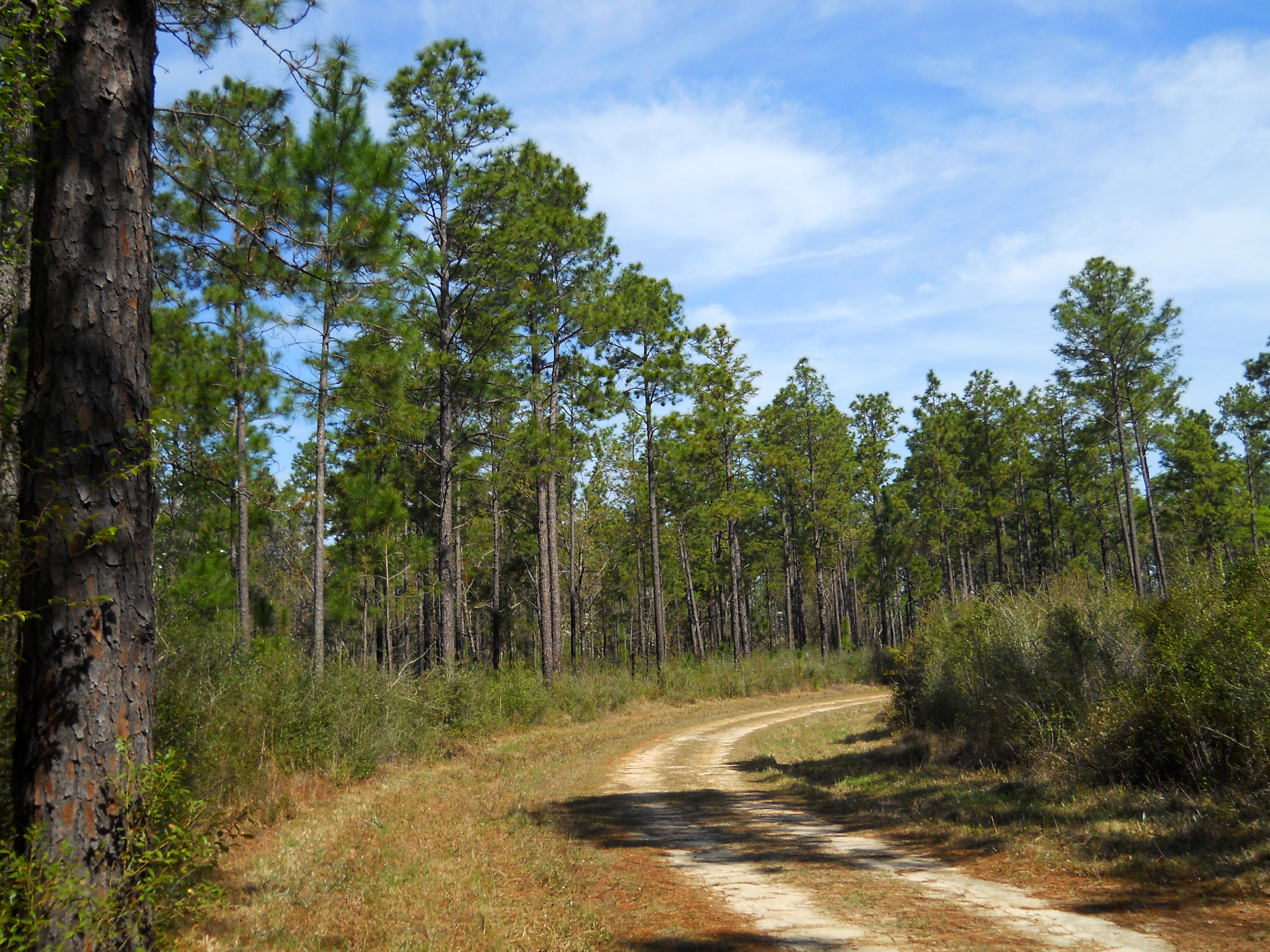
- View of a pine forest in De Soto National Forest, Stone County, Mississippi

- Location within the United States
- Location: Mississippi, US
- Nearest city: Hattiesburg, MS
- Coordinates: 31°04′N 88°59′W
- Area: 518,587 acres (2,098.65 km^{2})
- Established: June 15, 1936
- Governing body: U.S. Forest Service
- Website: National Forests in Mississippi

De Soto National Forest, named for 16th-century Spanish conquistador Hernando de Soto, is 518,587 acres (810 sq mi; 2,099 km^{2}) of pine forests in southern Mississippi. It is one of the most important protected areas for the biological diversity of the Gulf Coast ecoregion of North America.

It is a nationally important site for protection of longleaf pine savannas, pine flatwoods, and longleaf pine forests. More than 90 percent of this ecosystem type has been lost in the United States.

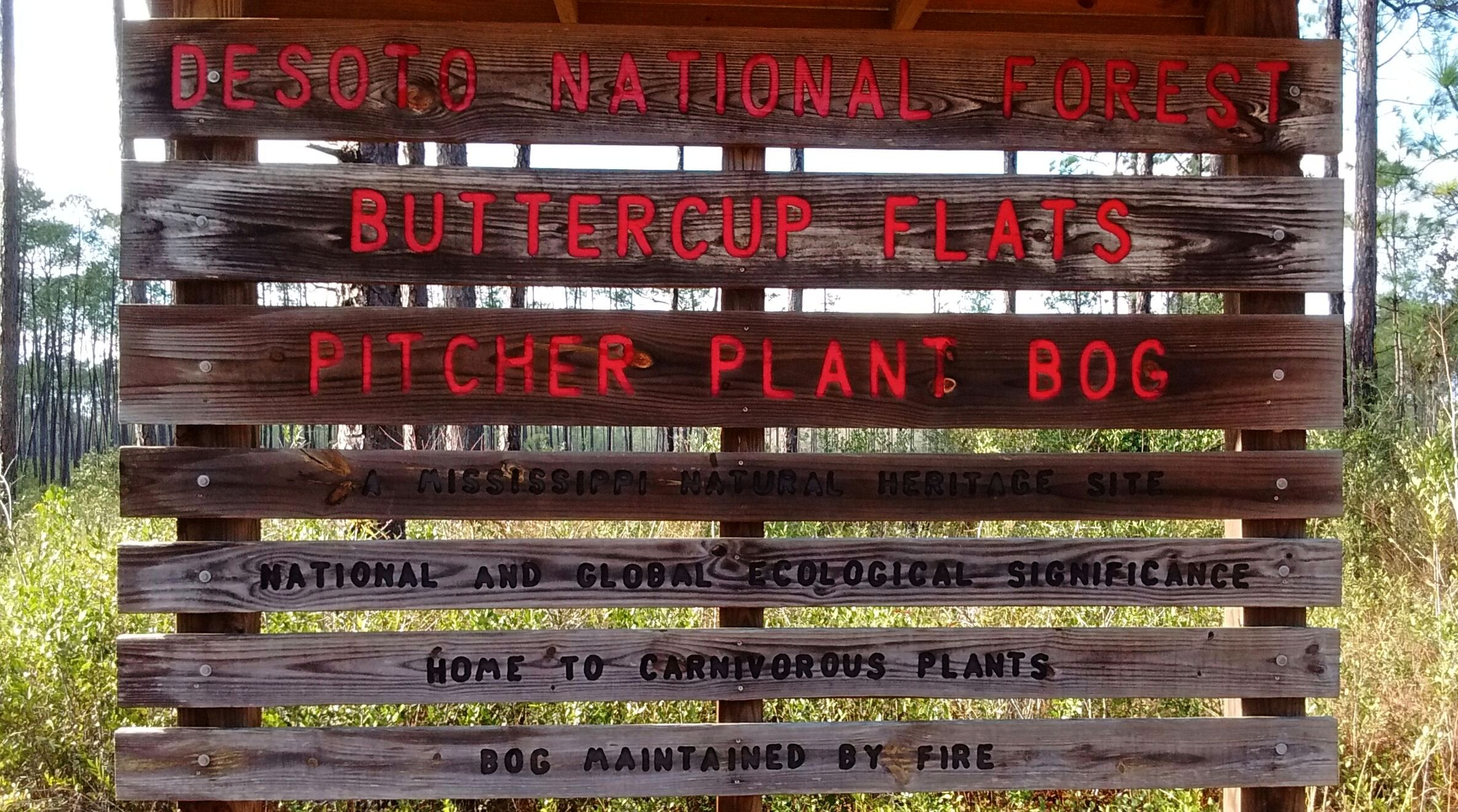
Sign at Buttercup Flats

The wet pine savannas support rare and endangered plant and animal species, such as the orchid Calopogon multiflorus, gopher frogs, and gopher tortoises. These habitats also have numerous carnivorous plants, particularly pitcher plants; Buttercup Flats has an international reputation in this regard. This national forest also offers year-round opportunities for outdoor activities, including camping, canoeing, bird-watching, photography, hunting, fishing, and more. There are two nationally significant wilderness areas within DeSoto: Black Creek Wilderness and Leaf River Wilderness. Black Creek is a popular stream for canoeing, camping, and fishing, and is Mississippi's only designated National Wild and Scenic River.

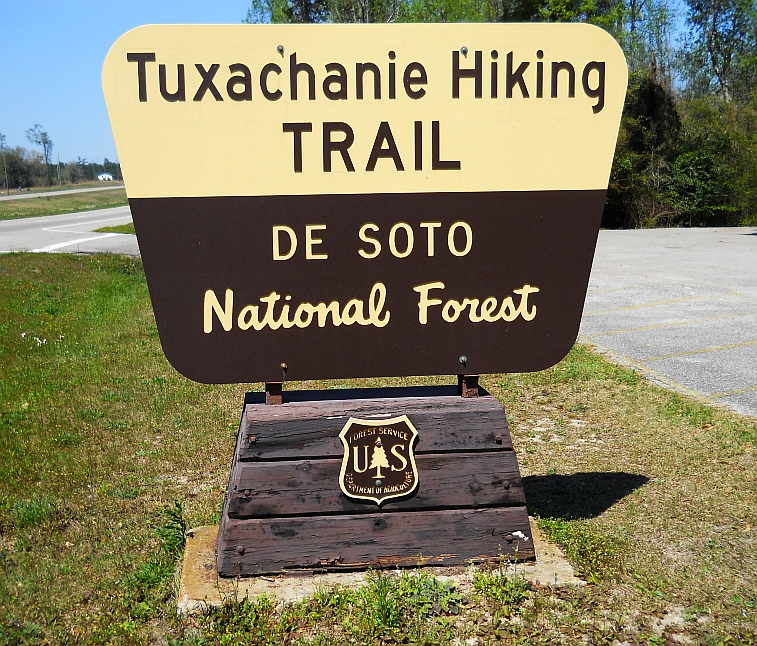

Two National Recreational Trails, the Black Creek Trail and Tuxachanie Trail, offer more than 60 miles (96.6 km) of hiking opportunities.

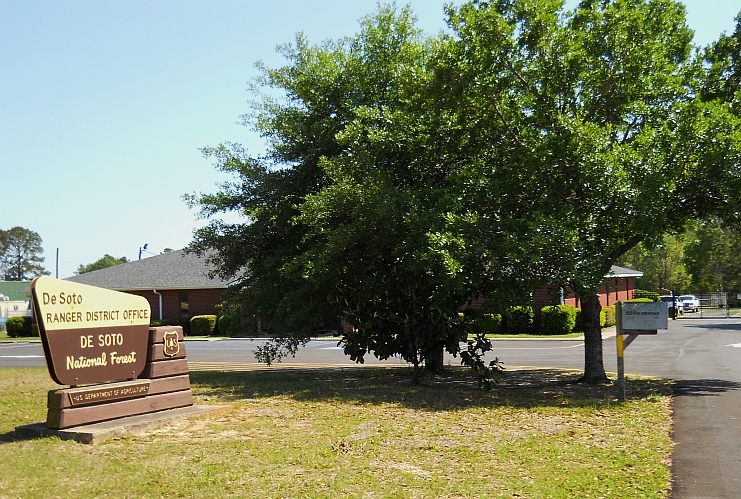
De Soto National Forest Ranger District Office in Wiggins, Mississippi

The forest headquarters office is in Jackson, the state capital, as are those for all six national forests in Mississippi. The local ranger district office is in Wiggins, which is surrounded by the national forest on three sides: north, east, and south.

De Soto National Forest is located between Hattiesburg and Gulfport, and can be easily accessed by U.S. Highway 49 and U.S. Highway 98. It lies in parts of ten counties. In descending order of land area they are Perry, Wayne, Harrison, Forrest, Stone, Greene, Jones, Jackson, George, and Pearl River counties.

== See also ==
- De Soto National Memorial, on the west coast of Florida
- List of national forests of the United States
- Brooklyn, Mississippi
- Perry County, Mississippi
- Black Creek Wilderness
- Red Creek
- Red Creek Wildlife Management Area (Mississippi)
- Leaf River Wildlife Management Area
- Gopher Farm sandhill
