= George County School District =

School district in Mississippi

Address
- 494 Cowart Street Lucedale, Mississippi, 39452; United States

District information
- Type: Public
- Grades: PreK–12
- NCES District ID: 2801560

Students and staff
- Students: 3,843 (2020–2021)
- Teachers: 250.44 (on an FTE basis)
- Staff: 352.55 (on an FTE basis)
- Student–teacher ratio: 15.34:1

Other information
- Website: www.gcsd.us

The George County School District is a public school district based in Lucedale, Mississippi (USA). The district's boundaries parallel that of George County.

== Schools ==
Secondary schools

- George County High School (Grades 9-12)
- George County Middle School (Grades 7-8)

Elementary/intermediate Schools

- Agricola Elementary School (K-6)
- Benndale Elementary School (K-6)
- Central Elementary School (K-6)
- Rocky Creek Elementary School (K-6)
- Lucedale Elementary School/LC Hatcher Elementary School (K-3)
- Lucedale Intermediate School (4-6)

== Demographics ==
=== 2006-07 school year ===
There were a total of 4,263 students enrolled in the George County School District during the 2006–2007 school year. The gender makeup of the district was 48% female and 52% male. The racial makeup of the district was 10.98% African American, 87.73% White, 1.06% Hispanic, 0.19% Asian, and 0.05% Native American. 44.7% of the district's students were eligible to receive free lunch.

=== Previous school years ===
School Year	Enrollment	Gender Makeup		Racial Makeup				
School Year	Enrollment	Female	Male	Asian	African American	Hispanic	Native American	White
2005-06	4,184	49%	51%	0.10%	10.95%	0.81%	0.02%	88.12%
2004-05	4,132	48%	52%	0.12%	11.01%	0.68%	0.02%	88.17%
2003-04	4,066	48%	52%	0.12%	11.76%	0.79%	0.07%	87.26%
2002-03	3,968	48%	52%	0.15%	11.39%	0.43%	0.10%	87.93%

== Accountability statistics ==
	2006-07	2005-06	2004-05	2003-04	2002-03
District Accreditation Status	Accredited	Accredited	Accredited	Accredited	Accredited
School Performance Classifications
Level 5 (Superior Performing) Schools	1	1	1	2	2
Level 4 (Exemplary) Schools	4	6	5	5	4
Level 3 (Successful) Schools	3	1	2	1	2
Level 2 (Under Performing) Schools	0	0	0	0	0
Level 1 (Low Performing) Schools	0	0	0	0	0
Not Assigned	0	0	0	0	0

== Sports ==
Sports offered include American football, baseball, basketball, soccer, tennis, golf, track & field and cross country.

== See also ==
- List of school districts in Mississippi
