= Lucedale, Mississippi =

- City
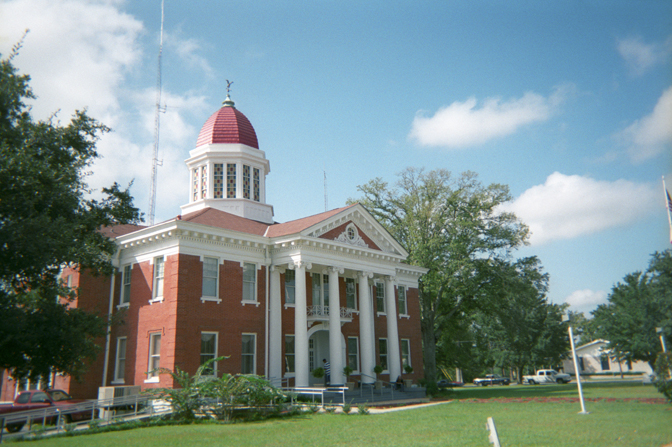
- George County Courthouse in Lucedale

- Flag Logo
- Motto(s): "Where People & Progress Meet"
- Location of Lucedale, Mississippi

- Location in the United States
- Coordinates: 30°55′29″N 88°35′26″W
- Country: United States
- State: Mississippi
- County: George

Government
  - Mayor: Doug Lee

Area
  - Total: 6.39 sq mi (16.55 km^{2})
  - Land: 6.39 sq mi (16.55 km^{2})
  - Water: 0 sq mi (0.00 km^{2})
- Elevation: 281 ft (86 m)

Population (2020)
  - Total: 2,869
  - Density: 448.9/sq mi (173.33/km^{2})
- Time zone: UTC-6 (Central (CST))
  - Summer (DST): UTC-5 (CDT)
- ZIP code: 39452
- Area codes: 601, 769
- FIPS code: 28-42440
- GNIS feature ID: 0672944
- Website: cityoflucedale.com

Lucedale (/ˈluːsdeɪl/) is a city in George County, Mississippi, United States. It is part of the Pascagoula metropolitan area. As of the 2020 census, Lucedale had a population of 2,869. It is the county seat of George County.

== History ==
Lucedale was one of several settlements created after the Mobile, Jackson and Kansas City Railroad penetrated northern Jackson County (now George County) in the late 1890s.

Lucedale was founded in 1901, and was named after Gregory Marston Luce, who operated a lumber business there.

Mississippi's first execution by electrocution was administered to a convicted wife-killer in Lucedale in 1940, using the only portable electric chair ever employed in the United States. The "death wagon" and chair had been on display outside the Mississippi capitol prior to arriving in Lucedale, and photos of the execution were published in state newspapers, the executioner commenting: "he died with tears in his eyes for the efficient care I took to give him a good clean burning".

== Geography ==
According to the United States Census Bureau, Lucedale has a total area of 6.4 square miles (16.6 km^{2}), all land.

== Demographics ==
Historical population
Census	Pop.	Note	%±
1910	797		—
1920	629		−21.1%
1930	834		32.6%
1940	1,204		44.4%
1950	1,631		35.5%
1960	1,977		21.2%
1970	2,083		5.4%
1980	2,429		16.6%
1990	2,592		6.7%
2000	2,458		−5.2%
2010	2,923		18.9%
2020	2,869		−1.8%
U.S. Decennial Census

=== 2020 census ===
As of the 2020 census, Lucedale had a population of 2,869. The median age was 38.3 years. 23.0% of residents were under the age of 18 and 18.3% were 65 years of age or older. For every 100 females, there were 111.1 males, and for every 100 females age 18 and over, there were 111.3 males age 18 and over.

0.0% of residents lived in urban areas, while 100.0% lived in rural areas.

There were 1,029 households in Lucedale, of which 31.9% had children under the age of 18 living in them. Of all households, 36.4% were married-couple households, 19.1% were households with a male householder and no spouse or partner present, and 40.3% were households with a female householder and no spouse or partner present. About 32.8% of all households were made up of individuals, and 15.9% had someone living alone who was 65 years of age or older. There were 504 families residing in the city.

There were 1,185 housing units, of which 13.2% were vacant. The homeowner vacancy rate was 1.5% and the rental vacancy rate was 9.9%.

Lucedale racial composition as of 2020
Race	Num.	Perc.
White (non-Hispanic)	1,858	64.76%
Black or African American (non-Hispanic)	753	26.25%
Native American	12	0.42%
Asian	30	1.05%
Pacific Islander	1	0.03%
Other/Mixed	119	4.15%
Hispanic or Latino	96	3.35%

== Arts and culture ==
Lucedale Public Library is part of the Jackson-George Regional Library System.

== Education ==
Lucedale is served by the George County School District. As of 2010, the district spends US$6,732 per pupil—63% on instruction, 30% on support services, and 7% on other elementary and secondary expenditures—and 15 students existed for every full-time equivalent teacher.

== Infrastructure ==
=== Highways ===
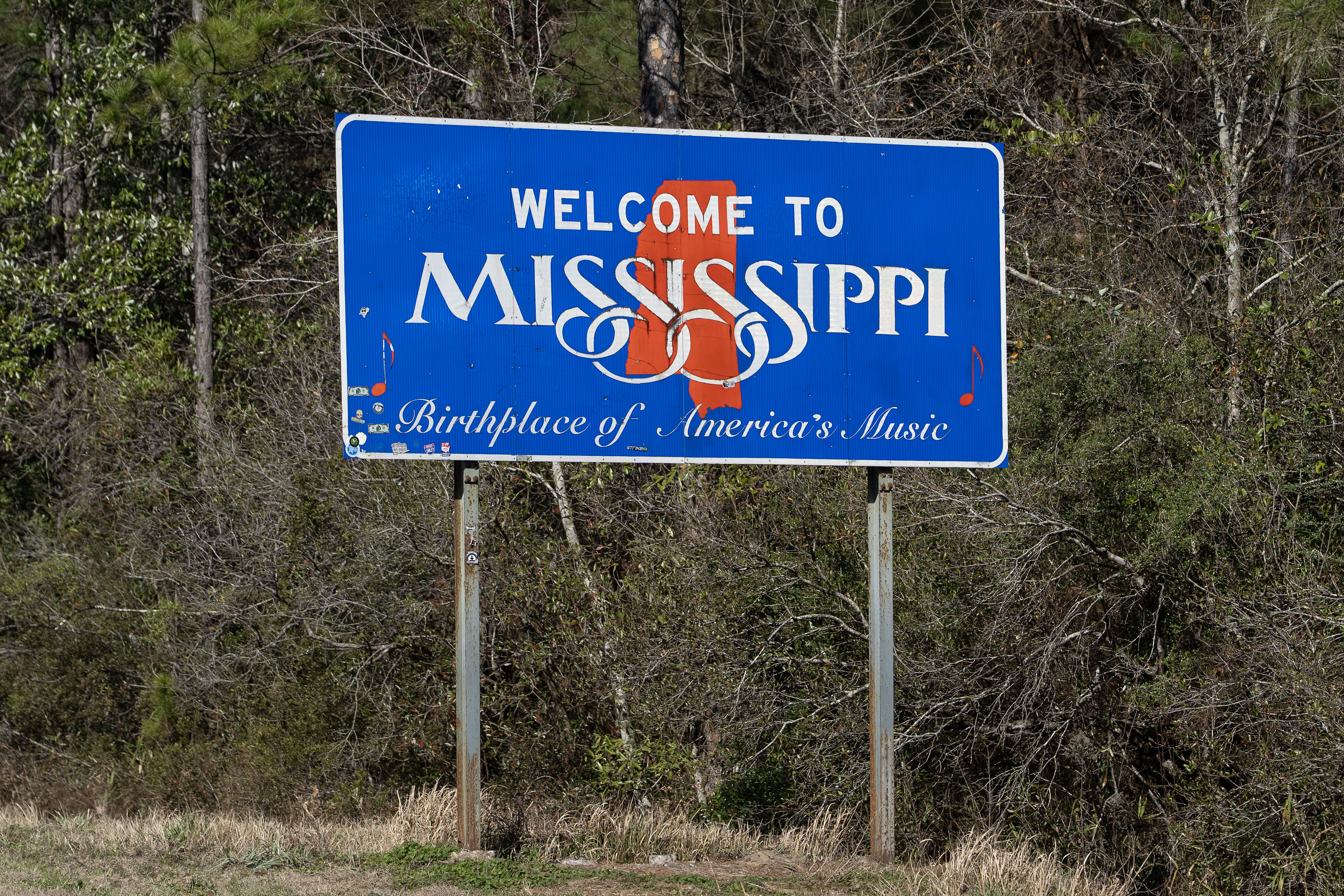
State welcome sign on US 98

- Mississippi Highway 198 passes through the city as Main Street
- US 98
- Highway 63

=== Public safety ===
Lucedale Police Department consists of a police chief, 11 patrolmen, and one investigator. Lucedale Fire Department was established in 1901, and consists of a fire chief, three firemen, and four volunteer firemen.

=== Healthcare ===
George Regional Hospital in Lucedale is a 50-bed, non-profit, community owned hospital serving George County, Greene County, Stone County, and northern Jackson County.

== Notable people ==
- Ruthie Bolton, Olympic gold medalist basketball player
- Janice Lawrence Braxton, Olympic gold medalist basketball player
- Ty Fryfogle, football wide receiver for the Indiana Hoosiers
- Carolyn Haines, author, also credited as Caroline Burnes
- Annibel Jenkins, English professor, scholar
- Alonzo Lawrence, football defensive back
- Jake W. Lindsey, recipient of the Medal of Honor
- Dee McCann, professional football player
- Jerry Lott, known by his nickname and stage name Marty "The Phantom"
- Doug McLeod, member of the Mississippi House of Representatives
- Eric Moulds, professional football player
- John Nix, professional football player
- Justin Steele, professional baseball player
- Claude Passeau, professional baseball player
- McKinnley Jackson, professional football player
