= 1848 United States presidential election in Mississippi =

- November 7, 1848
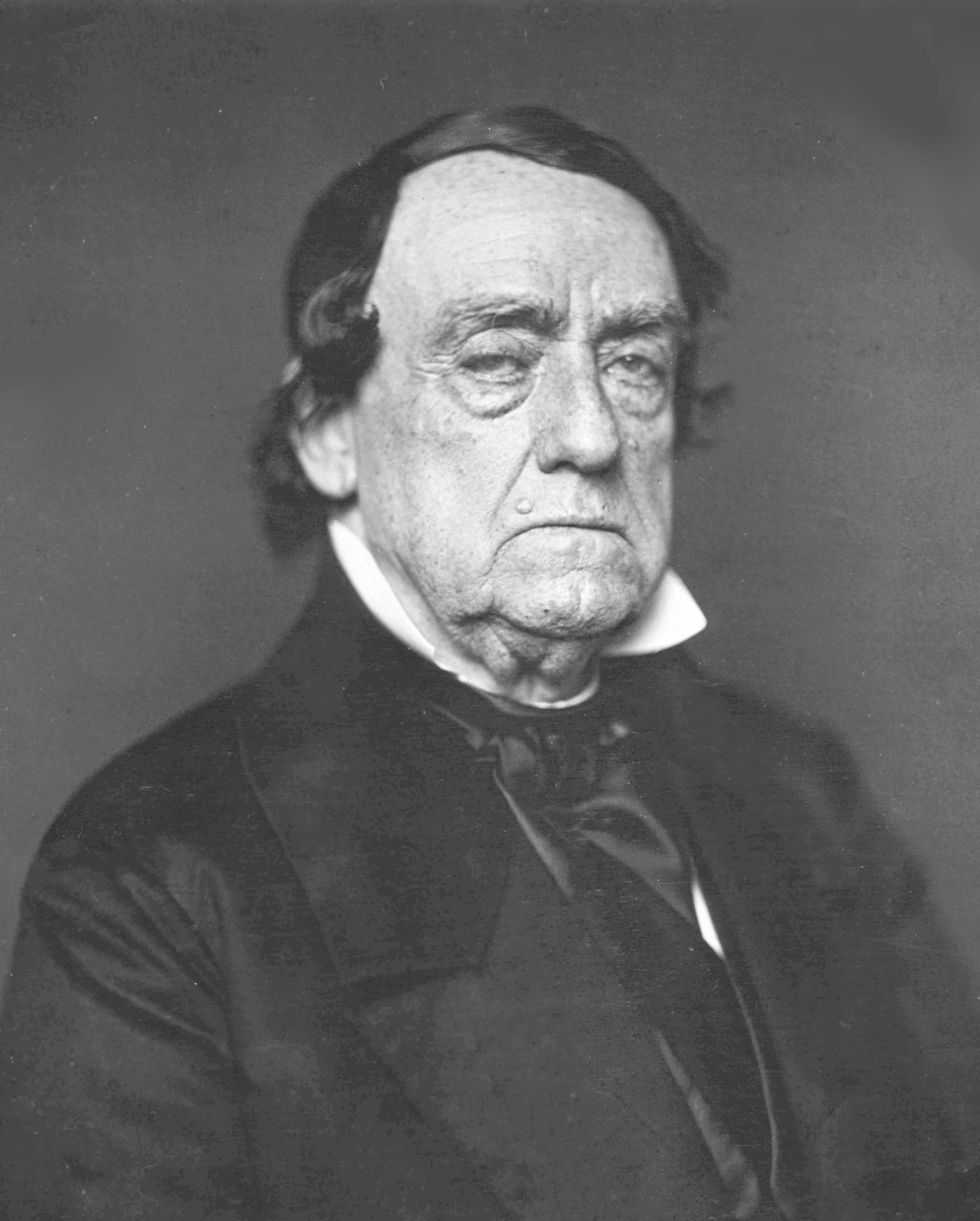

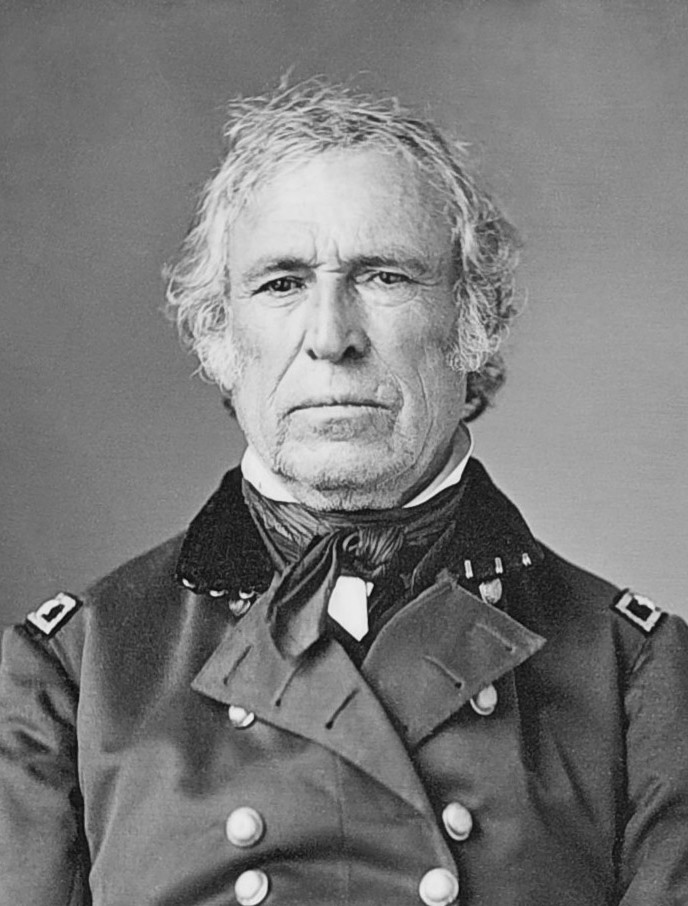
Nominee	Lewis Cass	Zachary Taylor
Party	Democratic	Whig
Home state	Michigan	Louisiana
Running mate	William O. Butler	Millard Fillmore
Electoral vote	6	0
Popular vote	26,545	25,911
Percentage	50.60%	49.40%
County results
Cass
50–60%
60–70%
70–80%
80–90%
Taylor
50–60%
60–70%
70–80%
President before election
James K. Polk
Democratic
Elected President
Zachary Taylor
Whig

The 1848 United States presidential election in Mississippi took place on November 7, 1848, as part of the 1848 United States presidential election. Voters chose six representatives, or electors to the Electoral College, who voted for President and Vice President.

Mississippi voted for the Democratic candidate, Lewis Cass, over Whig candidate Zachary Taylor. Cass won Mississippi by a margin of 1.2%.

== Results ==
1848 United States presidential election in Mississippi
Party	Candidate	Running mate	Popular vote		Electoral vote	
Party	Candidate	Running mate	Count	%	Count	%
Democratic	Lewis Cass of Michigan	William O. Butler of Kentucky	26,545	50.60%	6	100.00%
Whig	Zachary Taylor of Louisiana	Millard Fillmore of New York	25,911	49.40%	0	0.00%
Total			52,456	99.99%	6	100.00%

== See also ==
- United States presidential elections in Mississippi
