= Kiln, Mississippi =

CDP in Hancock County, Mississippi, United States

- Census-designated place
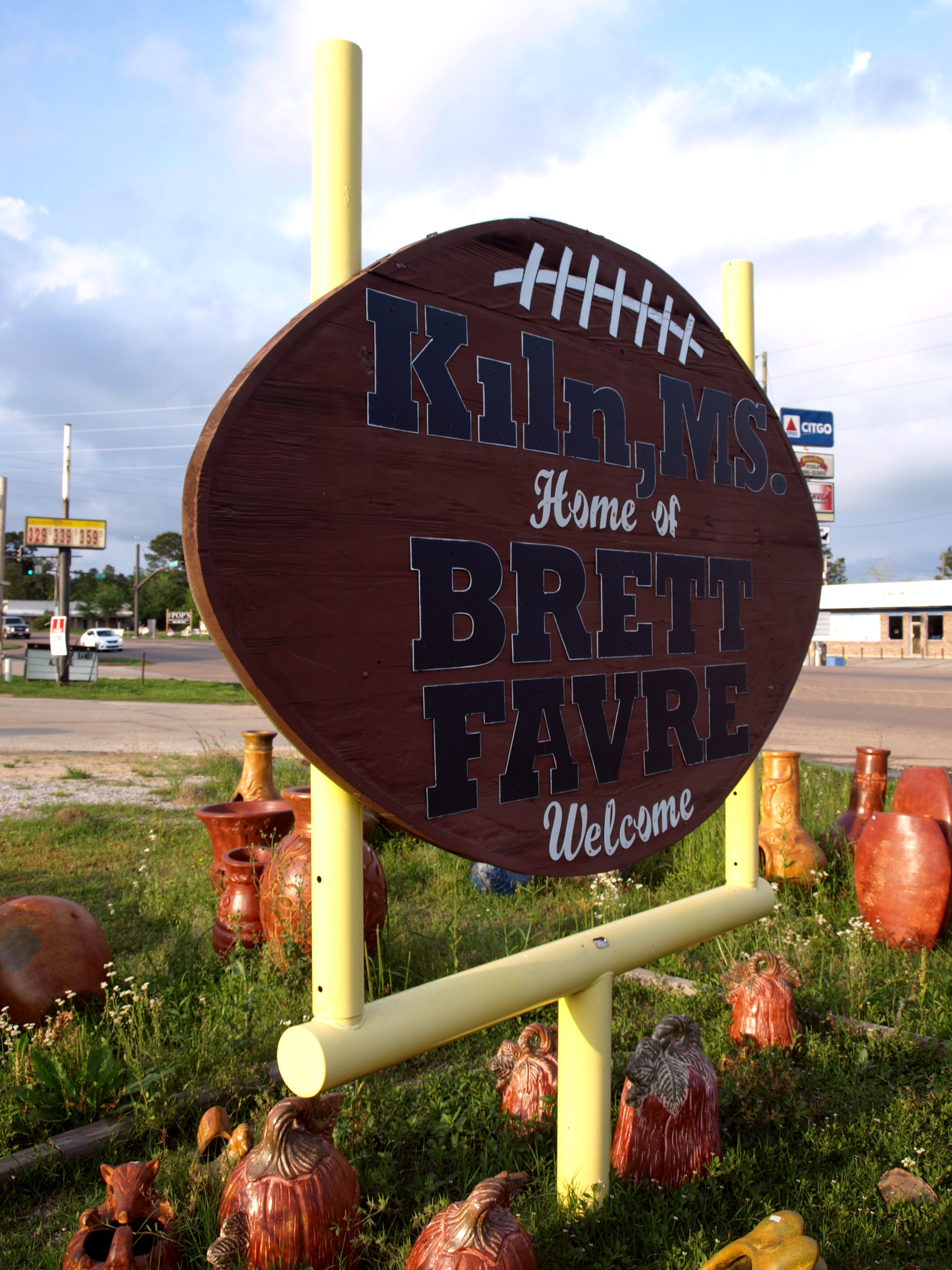
- A football-shaped city welcome sign in honor of notable former resident Brett Favre

- Location of Kiln, Mississippi

- Location in the United States
- Coordinates: 30°25′01″N 89°25′56″W
- Country: United States
- State: Mississippi
- County: Hancock

Area
  - Total: 13.42 sq mi (34.75 km^{2})
  - Land: 13.17 sq mi (34.10 km^{2})
  - Water: 0.25 sq mi (0.65 km^{2})
- Elevation: 30 ft (9.1 m)

Population (2020)
  - Total: 2,224
  - Density: 168.9/sq mi (65.23/km^{2})
- Time zone: UTC-6 (Central (CST))
  - Summer (DST): UTC-5 (CDT)
- ZIP code: 39556
- Area code: 228
- FIPS code: 28-37600
- GNIS feature ID: 2403175

Kiln is an unincorporated community and census-designated place (CDP) in Hancock County, Mississippi, United States. The town is located about 50 miles (80 km) northeast of New Orleans, Louisiana. It is part of the Gulfport–Biloxi Metropolitan Statistical Area. As of the 2020 census, Kiln had a population of 2,224.

== History ==
=== From earliest inhabitants to United States annexation ===
The earliest inhabitants of the area were Choctaw and Muscogee Indians, who lived along the banks of a river (later named the Jourdan River) emptying into the Bay of Saint Louis. These tribes hunted, fished, and trapped on the land prior to settlement by the French. In 1682, René-Robert Cavelier, Sieur de La Salle, a French explorer, claimed the region for France and named it "Louisiana", in honor of King Louis XIV, and the Mississippi Gulf Coast became part of the Lower Louisiana District.

Following the French claiming of the land, French settlers, many from Canada, began to move into the area surrounding modern-day Kiln. These settlers were exclusively male and were mostly hunters and trappers. The only commercial activity was in hides and pelts, which were sent to New Orleans for shipping. The first known white settlers in the area were Jean Baptiste Nicaize (Necaise) and his family. It is likely they moved from the Wolf River area near current-day DeLisle to Kiln and acquired the J. B. Necaise claim under a Spanish land grant around 1800 or before. There is a record of marriage on May 11, 1745, of Jean Baptiste Nicaize to Marie Cathering Miot (Meaut) in the Wolf River area. This record also noted that the father of J. B. Necaise was a native of Paris, France. The Jourdan River received its name from Noel Jourdan, an early settler on the river, who had received a Spanish land grant at the present site of Diamondhead. Jourdan later served as a delegate to the Mississippi Constitutional Convention of 1817, and he was the first representative of Hancock County in the Mississippi Legislature. The area came to be known as the Jourdan Community by its inhabitants. With the arrival of white settlers from the East, the Indian tribes eventually left the area. By the turn of the 19th century, the last full-blooded Choctaw Indians left the area for land grants in Oklahoma.

In 1763, France ceded Louisiana east of the Mississippi River to Great Britain in the Treaty of Paris. The area became part of the colony of British West Florida. In 1783, British West Florida was ceded to Spain as part of the Peace of Paris, and the area became part of the province of Spanish West Florida. The United States claimed West Florida in 1803 as part of the Louisiana Purchase. However, Spain disputed this claim. Tensions between the United States and Spain grew as many Americans began to move into the area. A large number of these immigrants were Tories who resented Spanish rule. On May 14, 1812, immediately prior to the start of the War of 1812 with Great Britain, with whom Spain was allied, the United States assigned the claimed area to the Mississippi Territory, even though the area was still governed by Spain. On February 12, 1813, the United States Congress passed a statute giving President James Madison authority to occupy the area. In April 1813, an American force occupied Mobile and received the surrender of the Spanish commander.

=== Timber industry boom and bust ===
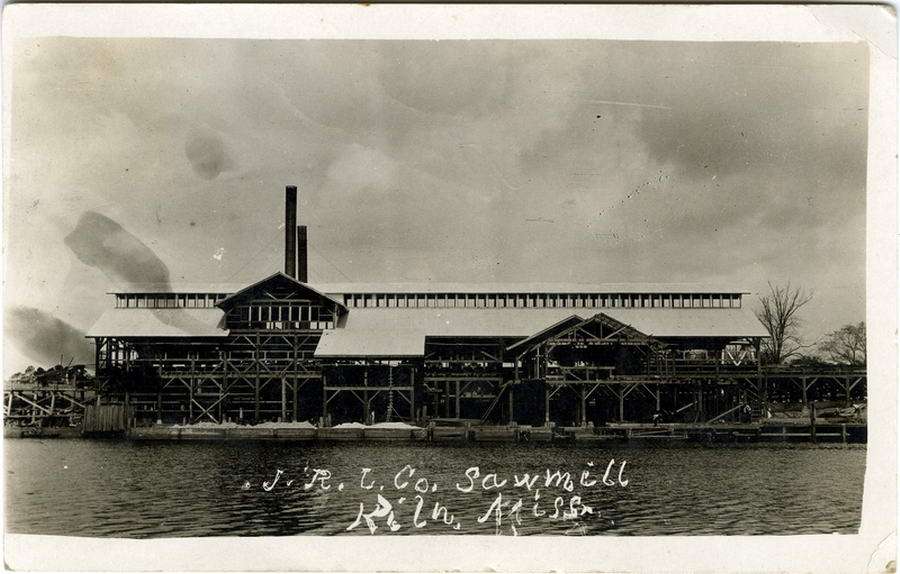
Jourdan River Lumber Company sawmill

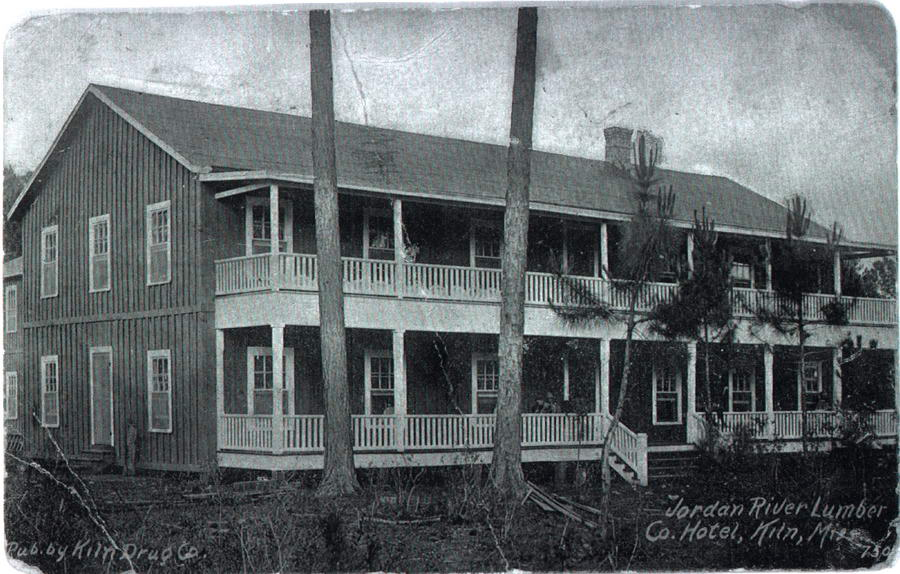
Jourdan River Lumber Company hotel

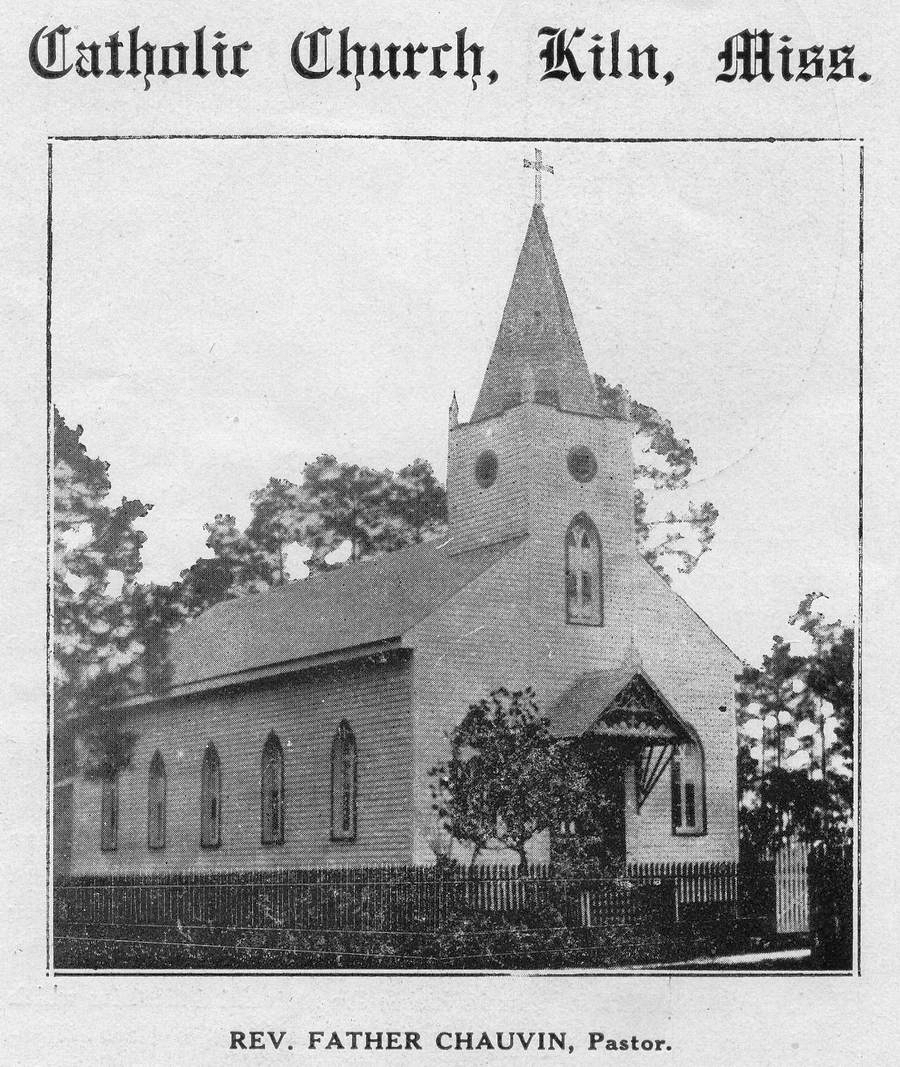
Annunciation Catholic Church, 1919

Kiln takes its name from the many kilns once found in the area. These kilns served the timber industry; they produced naval stores such as tar, which were shipped by schooner to New Orleans and used for caulking ships. Tar kilns had operated in the Hancock County area to produce naval stores since the days when it was part of British West Florida. During the 1840s, the Jourdan Community had a prosperous business in the production of charcoal, which it also sold on the New Orleans market. By the 1880s, some inhabitants began referring to the community as "Kiln", and by 1913 the town's name was firmly established. Today, the area is referred to by locals as "the Kiln", with the "n" silent.

The sawmill era began around the time of the American Civil War, when a sawmill was built on the Jourdan River by Samuel L. Favre from Mobile. He also built a home on the Jourdan River in 1859. Later, this house was moved to its present location near Annunciation Catholic Church and is currently owned by one of his descendants. It is considered the oldest house in the Kiln. Francois Haas from New Orleans built a sawmill on Bayou Talla in the Kiln area. After the Civil War, Favre moved to the Logtown and Napoleon areas, and the Francois Haas sawmill was operated by Elisha Haas and Timothy Herlihy. Later, the mill became known as the Herlihy and Haas Mill. In the late 19th century, the Jourdan River had shipyards, and the river provided water transportation access to the nearby Mississippi Gulf Coast ports that served the then-booming yellow pine timber industry. One shipyard on the Jourdan was operated by a man named Willie Curet, another shipyard on Bayou Talla was operated by a man named Jeremiah Haas, and Savadore Necaise operated a shingle mill. These family names are familiar in the area, and descendants of these men live in Hancock County today.

During the boom years, the Kiln was home to many timber mills. On December 7, 1908, the W. W. Carre Company, Ltd., from New Orleans purchased the Herlihy and Haas Mill and built a railroad track to the northern end of Hancock County to facilitate the flow of raw lumber. The sawmill burned in 1912, and in December of that year the logging railroad and equipment were sold to the Stern Foundry & Machinery Company of New Orleans. In January 1913, the remaining property at Kiln was sold to the Edward Hines Lumber Company of Chicago, and the operation was reorganized as the Jourdan River Lumber Company. The original mill was replaced in 1914 with a new mill with a cutting capacity of 150,000 feet (46,000 m) per day. To accommodate all of the workers at the mill, around 200 mill houses were built. A school building was also built in the area. To support the number of workers coming into the area, other businesses began to establish themselves. These local businesses included a company store, a 50-room hotel with a restaurant, a small hospital with round-the-clock physician and nurse, a movie theater, and a drug store. In addition, there was a secondary school, several churches, and a semi-pro baseball team. According to historian Samuel Grady Thigpen, for a time the Kiln was the busiest town between Hattiesburg and New Orleans.

The Great Depression hit the Kiln hard, combined with the depletion of the lumber supply in the area, eventually causing the loss of many of the local businesses. In February 1930, the mill cut out and was dismantled. The Kiln also lost its hotel, hospital, and railroad. The source of electricity for the town was cut off. By the mid-1930s, the Kiln had become a ghost town with no major industry. Much of the land that had been cleared for logging was grown over and once again became a forest wilderness. Many of the residents who stayed in the Kiln managed a living by distilling illegal whiskey. The production of whiskey became a big business in the Kiln after Mississippi passed a state-wide prohibition act in 1908. Being a source of sought-after moonshine during the Prohibition Era and also because of its high quality and ready availability, Kiln became known as the "Moonshine Capital of the World". At the height of moonshine popularity in the late 1920s, there were at least 50 moonshine stills operating in the Kiln. Mississippi's state-wide prohibition act was not repealed until 1966. Despite the depression and mass emigration from the town, a few older structures remain to this day, including Annunciation Catholic Church and the original post office (later Curet's Grocery), which has since been turned into a lawnmower repair shop.

=== Population growth and Hurricane Katrina ===
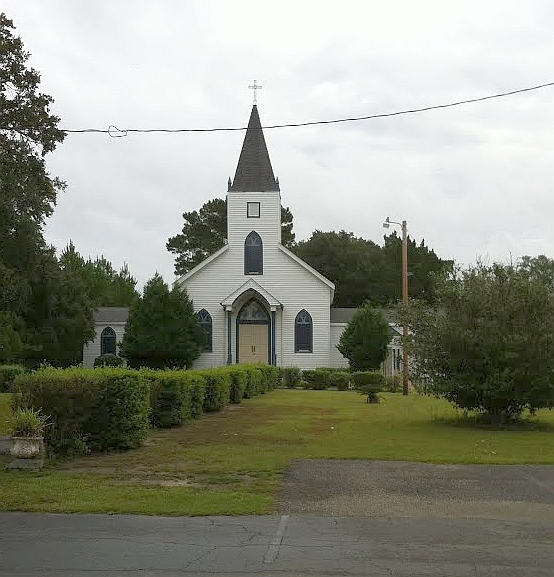
Annonciation Catholic Church, 2013

Toward the end of the 20th century, Kiln's population began to grow. Kiln's population grew from 1,262 people in 1990 to 2,040 by the end of the century, nearly a 62% increase in population over the decade. One of the main reasons for the population increase in not only Kiln but the entire Mississippi Gulf Coast was the growth of the casino industry in the area. The Mississippi Gaming Control Act of 1990 specified that gaming sites were restricted to the southernmost three counties in Mississippi (Hancock, Harrison, and Jackson counties). On December 5, 1990, Hancock County was the first county in Mississippi to approve dockside gambling. Three casinos opened in neighboring Harrison County in August 1992, and on September 30, 1992, Casino Magic opened in Bay St. Louis at the location of the current Hollywood Casino. Bayou Caddy's Jubilee Casino opened on January 7, 1994, in Lakeshore at the location of the current Silver Slipper Casino. The Gulf Coast casinos brought in new tourism and economic development to the area, which led to an increase in population in many cities and towns along the Gulf Coast, including Kiln. Kiln became the fastest growing area in Hancock County. This growth led to the establishment of several new businesses, a new post office, two new schools, and a new library in the town.

On August 29, 2005, Hurricane Katrina made its third landfall on the Mississippi Gulf Coast. Before and during landfall, water poured into the Bay of St. Louis, and the initial flooding occurred in low-lying areas along the Jourdan River and its tributary bayous. Therefore, Kiln and Diamondhead began to flood before the bulk of the surge came. The Kiln saw at least 30 feet (9.1 m) of floodwater. Several homes were severely damaged and destroyed. Kiln was spared the worst of the damage and served as a major point for reconstruction of Bay St. Louis and Waveland afterwards.

== Geography ==
Kiln is referred to locally as "the Kiln", with the "n" silent. This pronunciation is in accordance with the pronunciation of the word "kiln" during the Middle English Period. The Jourdan River borders the town to the south. Bayou Coco is in the southeastern part of the town, and Bayou Talla flows through the southern part of the community into the Jourdan. Bayou La Terre borders Kiln to the east.

According to the United States Census Bureau, the Kiln CDP has a total area of 13.4 square miles (34.7 km^{2}), of which 13.2 square miles (34.1 km^{2}) are land and 0.3 square miles (0.7 km^{2}), or 1.88%, are water.

=== Major highways ===
Mississippi Highways Mississippi Highway 43 and 603 form the main road through Kiln, leading south together 4 miles (6 km) to Interstate 10 at Exit 13. Highway 43 leads northwest 20 miles (32 km) to Picayune, and Highway 603 leads north 14 miles (23 km) to Necaise. Via Interstate 10, New Orleans is 57 miles (92 km) southwest of the center of Kiln, and Biloxi is 39 miles (63 km) to the east.

=== Nearby cities and towns ===
- Bay Saint Louis (13 miles [21 km] south)
- Diamondhead (7 miles [11 km] southeast)
- Shoreline Park (8 miles [13 km] south)
- Waveland (11 miles [18 km] south)
- Picayune, Mississippi (17 miles [27 km] southeast)

=== Climate ===
Climate data for Kiln, Mississippi
Month	Jan	Feb	Mar	Apr	May	Jun	Jul	Aug	Sep	Oct	Nov	Dec	Year
Record high °F (°C)	83 (28)	85 (29)	88 (31)	94 (34)	98 (37)	101 (38)	104 (40)	104 (40)	103 (39)	97 (36)	88 (31)	83 (28)	104 (40)
Mean daily maximum °F (°C)	59 (15)	63 (17)	69 (21)	75 (24)	82 (28)	87 (31)	89 (32)	89 (32)	85 (29)	77 (25)	69 (21)	61 (16)	75 (24)
Mean daily minimum °F (°C)	39 (4)	42 (6)	47 (8)	53 (12)	62 (17)	69 (21)	71 (22)	71 (22)	66 (19)	55 (13)	46 (8)	40 (4)	55 (13)
Record low °F (°C)	5 (−15)	9 (−13)	20 (−7)	28 (−2)	42 (6)	48 (9)	62 (17)	58 (14)	44 (7)	31 (−1)	24 (−4)	10 (−12)	5 (−15)
Average precipitation inches (mm)	5.51 (140)	5.23 (133)	5.36 (136)	4.85 (123)	4.69 (119)	5.68 (144)	6.89 (175)	6.3 (160)	5.05 (128)	3.75 (95)	4.86 (123)	4.57 (116)	62.74 (1,594)

== Demographics ==
Historical population
Census	Pop.	Note	%±
1990	1,262		—
2000	2,040		61.6%
2010	2,238		9.7%
2020	2,224		−0.6%
U.S. Census data

=== Racial and ethnic composition ===
Kiln CDP, Mississippi – Racial and ethnic composition Note: the US Census treats Hispanic/Latino as an ethnic category. This table excludes Latinos from the racial categories and assigns them to a separate category. Hispanics/Latinos may be of any race.
Race / Ethnicity (NH = Non-Hispanic)	Pop 2000	Pop 2010	Pop 2020	% 2000	% 2010	% 2020
White alone (NH)	1,931	2,027	1,913	94.66%	90.57%	86.02%
Black or African American alone (NH)	53	68	69	2.60%	3.04%	3.10%
Native American or Alaska Native alone (NH)	6	11	14	0.29%	0.49%	0.63%
Asian alone (NH)	6	5	21	0.29%	0.22%	0.94%
Native Hawaiian or Pacific Islander alone (NH)	0	0	0	0.00%	0.00%	0.00%
Other race alone (NH)	0	1	11	0.00%	0.04%	0.49%
Mixed race or Multiracial (NH)	13	43	115	0.64%	1.92%	5.17%
Hispanic or Latino (any race)	31	83	81	1.52%	3.71%	3.64%
Total	2,040	2,238	2,224	100.00%	100.00%	100.00%

=== 2020 census ===
As of the 2020 census, Kiln had a population of 2,224. The median age was 42.2 years. 23.2% of residents were under the age of 18 and 18.1% of residents were 65 years of age or older. For every 100 females there were 114.9 males, and for every 100 females age 18 and over there were 112.8 males age 18 and over.

0.0% of residents lived in urban areas, while 100.0% lived in rural areas.

There were 884 households in Kiln, of which 30.0% had children under the age of 18 living in them. Of all households, 46.8% were married-couple households, 23.2% were households with a male householder and no spouse or partner present, and 23.5% were households with a female householder and no spouse or partner present. About 28.5% of all households were made up of individuals and 12.6% had someone living alone who was 65 years of age or older.

There were 1,085 housing units, of which 18.5% were vacant. The homeowner vacancy rate was 1.9% and the rental vacancy rate was 6.9%.

=== 2010 census ===
As of the census of 2010, there were 2,238 people, 847 households, and 597 families residing in the CDP. There were 987 housing units. The racial makeup of the CDP was 92.7% White, 3.40% African American, 0.6% Native American, 0.2% Asian, and 2.4% from two or more races. Hispanic or Latino people of any race were 3.7% of the population.

There were 847 households, out of which 27.4% had children under the age of 18 living with them, 50.3% were married couples living together, 14.5% had a female householder with no husband present, and 29.5% were non-families. 21.6% of all households were made up of individuals, and 6.8% had someone living alone who was 65 years of age or older. The average household size was 2.59 and the average family size was 3.03.

In the CDP, the population was spread out, with 26.8% under the age of 20, 28.7% from 20 to 44, 30.7% from 45 to 64, and 13.8% who were 65 years of age or older. The median age was 42.3 years. For every 100 females, there were 103.8 males. For every 100 females age 20 and over, there were 99.6 males.

Of the 1,105 individuals over 24 years old, 29.59% completed less than high school, 26.70% completed high school, 36.56% completed some college or an associate degrees, 4.71% completed a bachelor's degree, and 2.44% completed a graduate degree.

== Education ==
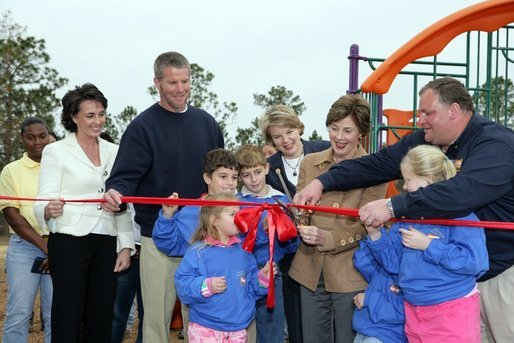
Ribbon cutting ceremony at Hancock North Central Elementary with Laura Bush, Brett and Deanna Favre in 2006

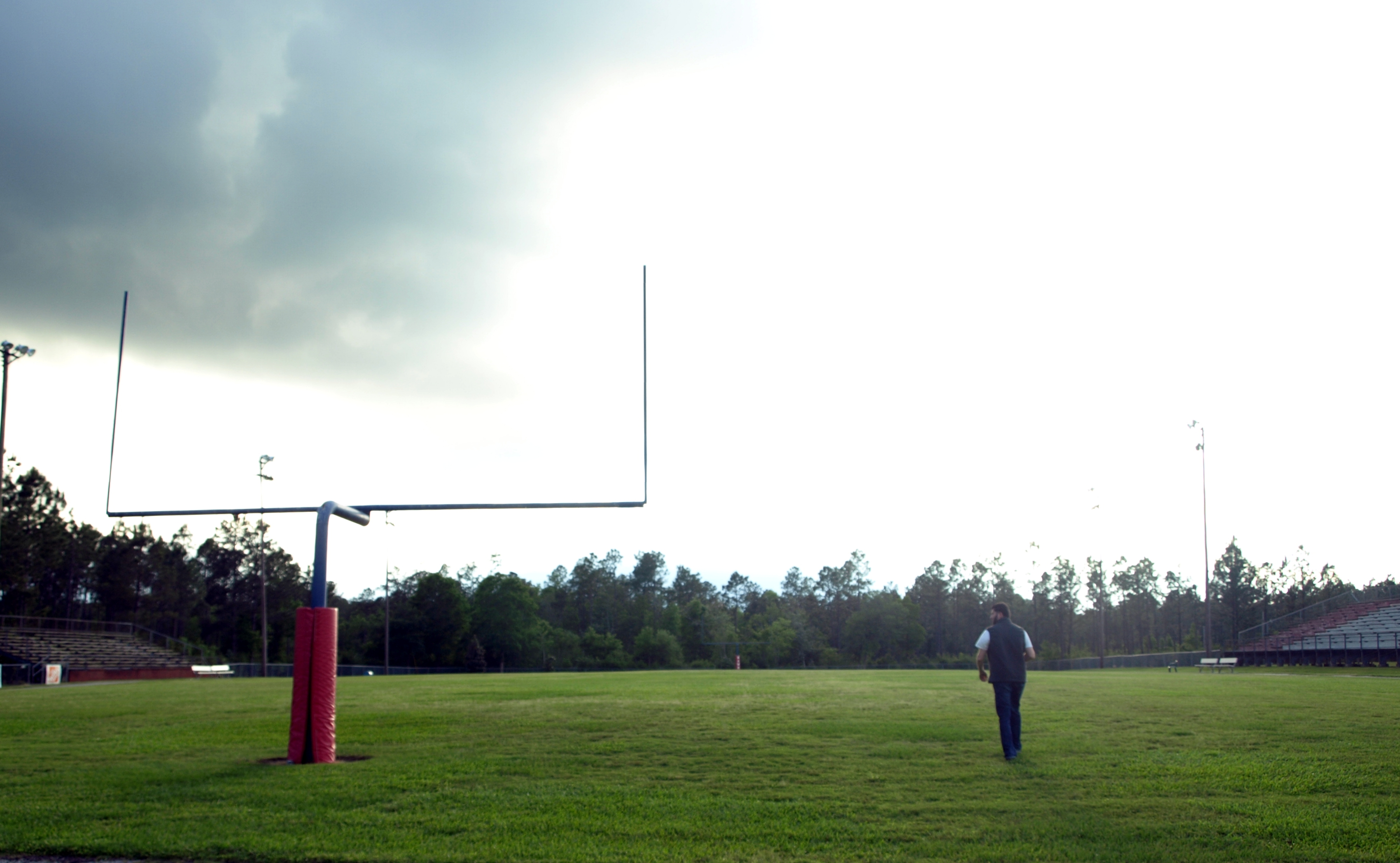
VHancock North Central High School's former football field, where Brett Favre once played

Kiln is served by the Hancock County School District. The town is home to a vocational school, two elementary schools, a middle school, and a high school.

All of Hancock County is in the service area of Pearl River Community College.

=== Vocational school ===
- Hancock County Vocational Center

=== Elementary schools ===
- East Hancock Elementary School
- Hancock North Central Elementary School (located at the site of the former Hancock North Central High School)
- West Hancock Elementary School

=== Middle school ===
- Hancock Middle School

=== High school ===
- Hancock High School

== Notable people ==
- Dick Arrington, National Football League offensive lineman
- Earl A. Cuevas, Poet Laureate of Mississippi
- Brett Favre, professional football player and Pro Football Hall of Fame inductee
- Deanna Favre, founder of the Deanna Favre Hope Foundation
- Leland Mitchell, professional basketball player
- Philip Moran, member of the Mississippi House of Representatives
- Serabee, singer-songwriter
