= Mississippi Gulf Coast =

Region in the US state of Mississippi

- Region
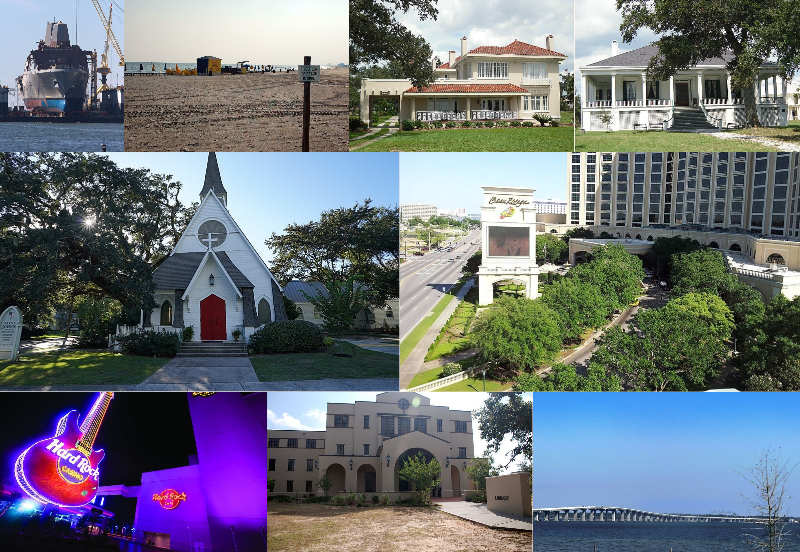
- Clockwise from top: Ingalls Shipbuilding, the Biloxi Beach, the Dantzler House, Beauvoir, the Beau Rivage Casino, the Bay Saint Louis Bridge, the USM Gulf Park, the Hard Rock Casino Biloxi, and Saint John's Episcopal Church
- Nickname: The Coast
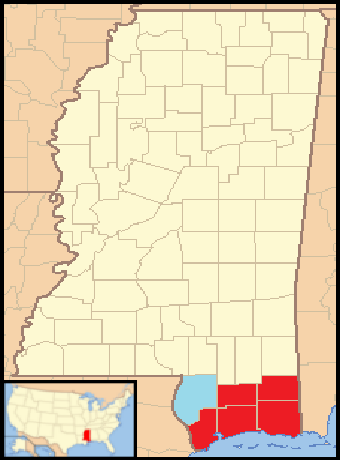
- Map of Mississippi with the Gulf Coast region highlighted. The counties in red correspond to the Gulfport-Biloxi-Pascagoula MSA. Pearl River County (blue), a part of Greater New Orleans, is included in the geographical definition which includes all of Mississippi south of 31° N.

Area (Note: Adding up the individual areas of Pearl River, Stone, George, Jackson, Harrison, and Hancock counties, the six counties below the 31st parallel mentioned in the reference from the Sun Herald, and converting from square miles to acres provides this result.)
  - Total: 2,764,358 acres (1,118,696 ha)

Dimensions
  - Length: 80 mi (130 km)
  - Width: 55 mi (89 km)

Population (April 1, 2010)
  - Total: 370,702
  - Estimate (2018): 397,261
  - Density: 85.8244/sq mi (33.1370/km^{2})
- Time zone: UTC-6 (CST)
  - Summer (DST): UTC-5 (CDT)
- Area code: 228
- Website: www.gulfcoast.org

The Mississippi Gulf Coast, also known as Mississippi Coast, Mississippi Gulf Coast region, Coastal Mississippi, and The Coast, is the area of Mississippi along the Mississippi Sound at the northern extreme of the Gulf of Mexico.

== Geography ==
At the state's creation, Hancock and Jackson were the only two counties to make up this region. However, before the end of the first centennial, subdivisions in the counties led to the formation of Harrison County, as well as the pineywoods counties of Pearl River, Stone and George.

=== Cities ===
The Mississippi Gulf Coast consists of many cities that lie directly on the Mississippi Sound. The U. S. Census Bureau divided the Metropolitan Statistical Area (MSA) for the Mississippi Gulf Coast in 2003, which previously consisted of the three coastal counties (Hancock; Harrison; Jackson), into two MSAs that included two additional counties (George; Stone). Cities in the new Metropolitan Statistical Area include the original French settlements Biloxi and Ocean Springs, as well as Waveland, Bay St. Louis, Diamondhead, Pass Christian, Long Beach, Gulfport, D'Iberville, Gautier, Pascagoula, Moss Point, Lucedale, and Wiggins.

== History ==
=== Early history ===
The Biloxi people lived in the region at least as early as 1699.

=== Colonial History ===
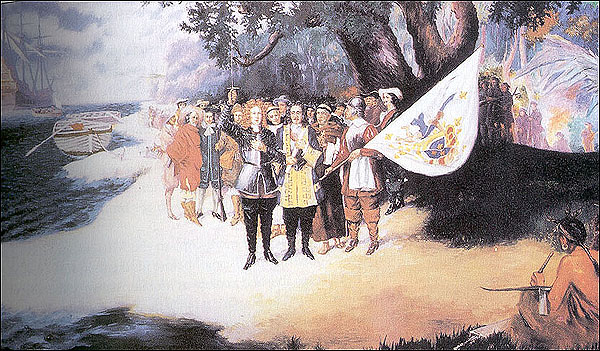
Pierre Lemoyne and company disembarking on Ship Island in the Mississippi Sound

In 1699, Pierre Le Moyne d'Iberville arrived to establish a colony near the mouth of the Mississippi River. He landed on the Ship Island, and three days later, arrived on the Mississippi Gulf Coast, establishing a colony and building Fort Maurepas, which served as the first capital of French Louisiana. The fort became a base of operations to continue exploring the area.

The French settlers found the area to be difficult to maintain a settlement. According to Bunn & Williams (2007), factors such as death of crops, lack of fresh water, lack of discipline, and illness led to difficulty in maintaining the colonization of the area. Furthermore, due to political concerns, the capital of French Louisiana was moved to Mobile in 1701; the fort was abandoned by 1702. Despite a temporary move of the capital to Biloxi during the construction of New Orleans, previous failures kept the area from playing a further role in French colonization efforts in the region.

=== Statehood and Antebellum Period ===
When Mississippi entered the Union in 1817, the majority of the population lived in Northern parts of the state. At statehood, the population of the coast comprised 2.5% of the state's total. Likewise, the Census lists only 586 of the state's 30,061 slaves as living on the Mississippi Gulf Coast. After statehood, the coastal regions remained a frontier, with cultural influences coming from the Mediterranean area. According to Kenneth P'Pool, deputy historic preservation officer at MDAH, "The Coast's situation along ... the Gulf of Mexico — both facilitated the region's ethnic diversity and maintained its ties to the rest of the world much more easily than was possible for other regions of [Mississippi]."

=== Civil War ===
Fort Massachusetts, on Ship Island, was seized during the American Civil War.

=== Twentieth century ===
In the 20th century, Keesler Air Force Base brought development to the region. Hurricane Camille on August 17, 1969, and Hurricane Katrina on August 29, 2005, caused historic destruction to the Gulf Coast. Originally dubbed "America's Riviera", the Mississippi Gulf Coast gained prominence in the early 1900s as a gambling and tourist mecca, an alternative to Florida as a warm, actively fun area with gaming (although illegal at the time, it was allowed at certain resorts) and home to the longest manmade beach in the world. Golfing also became a strong draw to snowbirds looking to play their game of choice all year long. During the early 90's, gaming was made legal in the two coastal counties of Harrison and Hancock. This brought a new era of growth with Vegas style gaming hotel and casinos; along with this, condo towers started to dot the coast as it became the 2nd largest gaming area in the US based on gaming space alone. After a disruption brought on by Hurricane Katrina, the Port of the Mississippi Gulf Coast bounced back quickly, aided by government funding. However, low-income black communities, such as North Gulfport, struggled to rebuild after Katrina due to a lack of support from the U.S. government. According to a New York Times article titled "Mississippi's Failure," "While many Mississippians languished without help, the Bush administration’s Department of Housing and Urban Development allowed the state to shift $600 million of the recovery money to the refurbishment and expansion of the Port of Gulfport."

== Education ==
As of May 2019, there are 126 K-12 schools spread across 16 school districts, which serve students in the Mississippi Gulf Coast region.

In addition, Mississippi Gulf Coast Community College offers associate degrees and career programs. The University of Southern Mississippi has a branch campus (Gulf Park) located in Long Beach, which offers undergraduate and graduate degree programs. In 2009, William Carey University opened its Tradition campus located off Mississippi Highway 67 in rural Harrison County and offers multidisciplinary educational programs at the undergraduate and master's level, as well as a doctoral program in pharmacy.

District	Achievement Rating (Note: Enter school district name into search box.)	Number of Schools (Note: The reference lists individual schools at the bottom of each school district's result page.)
Harrison County School District	B	20
Hancock County School District	B	6
Pearl River County School District	B	4
George County School District	B	8
Stone County School District	B	4
Jackson County School District	B	13
Gulfport School District	B	10
Biloxi Public School District	A	8
Ocean Springs School District	A	6
Picayune School District	C	9
Pascagoula-Gautier School District	B	17
Bay St. Louis-Waveland School District	C	4
Long Beach School District	A	5
Pass Christian Public School District	A	4
Poplarville School District	A	4
Moss Point Separate School District	D	4

== Notable people ==
- Mahmoud Abdul-Rauf, former NBA player
- Jeramey Anderson, American politician
- Walter Inglis Anderson, painter, writer, and naturalist
- Frederick Barthelme, novelist
- Manly Barton, American politician
- William Joel Blass, American politician
- Milt Bolling, American baseball player
- John Bond Jr., American politician
- Devin Booker, NBA shooting guard
- Jimmy Buffett, American singer-songwriter
- Charles Busby, American politician
- Cyril Edward Cain, American educator and historian
- Joseph Hilliard Cain Sr., American politician
- Joel Carter, American politician
- Carolyn Crawford, American politician
- Varina Davis, First Lady of the Confederate States of America
- Scott DeLano, American politician
- Jeremy England, American politician
- Casey Eure, American politician
- Mike Ezell, American politician
- Brett Favre, NFL quarterback
- Kevin Felsher, American politician
- Fred Haise, Former American NASA astronaut
- Boyce Holleman, American politician
- Jeffrey Hulum III, American politician
- Prentiss Ingraham, Confederate soldier and writer
- Eugene Antonio Marino, Archbishop emeritus of Atlanta
- George Austin McHenry, Mississippi pioneer and physician
- Jay McKnight, American politician
- Stevon Moore, American football player
- Jack Nelson, Pulitzer Prize winning journalist of the Civil Rights era
- George E. Ohr, ceramic artist
- Steven Palazzo, American politician
- John Read, American politician
- Brittney Reese, Olympic long jumper
- Robin Roberts, ABC News anchor
- Mike Seymour, American politician
- Larkin I. Smith, American politician
- Gene Taylor, American politician
- Mike Thompson, American politician
- Jesmyn Ward, American writer
- Brice Wiggins, American politician
- Fannie C. Williams, American educator
- William Woodward, American artist

== See also ==
- Land Trust for the Mississippi Coastal Plain
- Gulf Coast of the United States
- Mississippi Gulf Coast National Heritage Area
