= Mississippi Highway 600 =

Former highway in Mississippi

Mississippi Highway 600
- West Union Road; Caesar Necaise Road
- MS 600 highlighted in pink

Route information
- Maintained by MSHC and Pearl River County
- Length: 16.8 mi (27.0 km)
- Existed: 1958–1967

Major junctions
- West end: US 11 in Carriere
- East end: MS 603 in Necaise

Location
- Country: United States
- State: Mississippi
- Counties: Pearl River, Hancock

Highway system
- Mississippi State Highway System; Interstate; US; State
← MS 598	→ MS 601

Mississippi Highway 600 (MS 600) was a state highway in southern Mississippi. The route started at U.S. Route 11 (US 11) in Carriere and traveled eastward. The road crossed from Pearl River County to Hancock County and continued east until it reached MS 603 in Necaise. MS 600 was designated around 1958 from the Pearl River–Hancock county line to MS 603, and it was extended to US 11 by 1960. The route was removed from the state highway system by 1967.

== Route description ==
As of 1965, the route was located in Pearl River and Hancock counties. MS 600 started at US 11 in Carriere and traveled southeastward. The road turned east at Sycamore Road and crossed the Hobolochitto Creek. It then traveled over Mill Creek near Ceasar Road and through the unincorporated area of Caesar. MS 600 entered Hancock County east of Caesar, and it crossed Hickory Creek east of Anner Road. The route shifted northward until it reached Necaise Anner Road, and it traveled to its eastern terminus at MS 603. The road was maintained by the Mississippi State Highway Commission (MSHC) and Pearl River County, as part of the state highway system.

== History ==
MS 600 was designated around 1958, as a state-maintained gravel road from the Pearl River–Hancock county line to MS 603 in Necaise. The route was extended west along a county-maintained gravel road around 1960, to US 11 in Carriere in Pearl River County. The highway was removed from the state highway system by 1967, and Hancock County received a $2,700 refund (equivalent to $21,861 in 2024) from the Mississippi State Highway Department (MSHD) for the right of way along MS 600 in 1970. Today, the route in Pearl River County is known as West Union Road, and in Hancock County as Caesar Necaise Road.

== Major intersections ==
The route is documented as it existed in 1965.

County	Location	mi	km	Destinations	Notes
Pearl River	Carriere	0.0	0.0	US 11	Western terminus
Hancock	Necaise	16.8	27.0	MS 603	Eastern terminus
1.000 mi = 1.609 km; 1.000 km = 0.621 mi

== See also ==
- Mississippi Highway 602
