= Hancock High School (Mississippi) =

Location
- 7084 Stennis Airport Road; Kiln, Mississippi 39556; United States
- 30°22′29″N 89°26′48″W

Information
- Type: Comprehensive Public High School
- Opened: August 28, 1959
- School district: Hancock County School District
- Superintendent: Rhett Ladner
- Principal: Elizabeth Butler
- Staff: 74.14 (FTE)
- Grades: 9 to 12
- Gender: coed
- Enrollment: 1,187 (2022-23)
- Student to teacher ratio: 15.13
- Colors: Navy and red
- Mascot: Hawks
- Feeder schools: Hancock Middle School
- Website: hhs.hancockschools.net
- Last updated: July 2025

Hancock High School is a grade 9–12 public high school located in Kiln, Mississippi, United States, less than 60 miles from New Orleans. It is under the jurisdiction of the Hancock County School District.

== History ==
The Hancock County School District was created on December 13, 1955. The new school district consolidated the following community school districts in Hancock County: Sellers, Dedeaux, Kiln, Leetown, Caesar, Catahoula, Flat Top, Aaron Academy, Gainesville, Logtown, and Clermont Harbor.

Hancock High School was originally constructed at the location of the current Hancock North Central Elementary school and opened for classes on August 28, 1959. It was known as Hancock North Central and was a K-12 school.

A few decades later, a new facility was built for $9.2 million at the school's current location on Stennis Airport Road and was opened for grades 7–12 for the 1990–91 school year. The first graduation at the new facility was held in May 1991 with 117 students participating. Several years later, Hancock Middle School was constructed next to the high school for students in grades 6–8. Currently, the high school is a grade 9–12 school.

== Facilities ==
The Hancock County Performing Arts Center was opened on February 20, 2016 on the Hancock High School campus. It serves the school district and the surrounding community of Hancock County. The center houses plays, musicals, ceremonies, and other public events. The Performing Arts Center cost was $8.2 million funded by a 2012 $16 million bond issue. It is 24,620 square feet, and it has a seating capacity of 850.

== Academics ==
According to U.S. News & World Report, Hancock High school is nationally ranked at #8,200 among 17,843 nationally ranked schools. In the state of Mississippi, they are ranked #58 out of 227.

As of 2021, Hancock High School has 75 full-time teachers with a 17:1 student-teacher ratio. The graduation rate is 89 percent. Students have the opportunity to take Advanced Placement (AP) courses and exams. The AP participation rate is 21 percent with a participant passing rate of 16 percent.

Hancock High School offers various programs through the Career Technical Center. Programs such as architecture and drafting, automotive service technician, construction and carpentry, precision machining, culinary arts, early childhood education, health sciences, educator preparation, polymer science, law and public safety, welding, and engineering.

== Athletics ==
The Hancock Hawks field teams in archery, baseball, basketball, bowling, cheerleading, cross-country, football, golf, powerlifting, soccer, swimming, tennis, track, and volleyball.

== Extracurriculars ==
Students participate in marching band competitions and debate. Both Hancock High School and its feeder school, Hancock Middle School, participate in Beta Club conventions were students compete in different academic competitions.

== Notable alumni ==
- Wendell Ladner (Class of 1966), professional basketball player
- Deanna Favre (Class of 1986), founder of the Deanna Favre Hope Foundation
- Brett Favre (Class of 1987), professional football player
- Michael Grimm, singer; winner of season 5 of America's Got Talent
