= Diamondhead, Mississippi =

City in Mississippi, US

- City
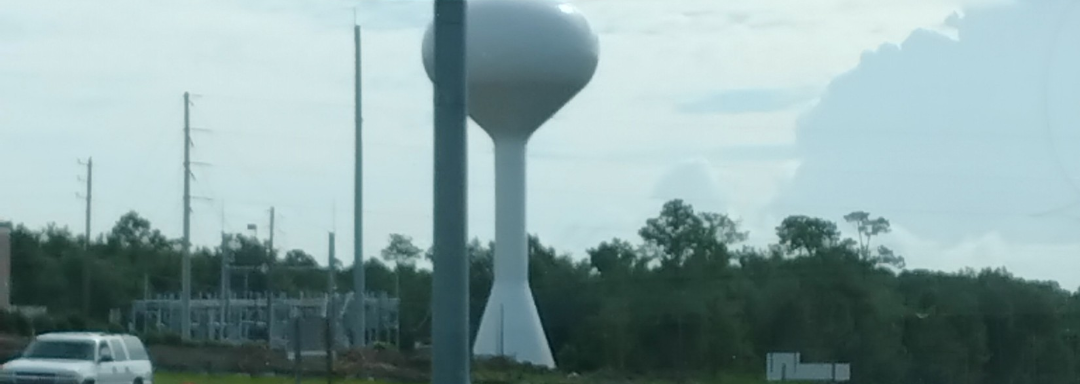

- Flag Logo
- Motto: "Where living is easy."
- Location of Diamondhead, Mississippi

- Location in the United States
- Coordinates: 30°23′0″N 89°22′22″W
- Country: United States
- State: Mississippi
- County: Hancock
- Incorporated: February 6, 2012

Government
  - Mayor: Anna Liese (R)

Area
  - Total: 12.57 sq mi (32.55 km^{2})
  - Land: 10.11 sq mi (26.18 km^{2})
  - Water: 2.46 sq mi (6.36 km^{2})
- Elevation: 66 ft (20 m)

Population (2020)
  - Total: 9,529
  - Density: 942.6/sq mi (363.95/km^{2})
- Time zone: UTC-6 (Central (CST))
  - Summer (DST): UTC-5 (CDT)
- ZIP code: 39525
- Area code: 228
- FIPS code: 28-19100
- GNIS feature ID: 0689399
- Website: www.diamondhead.ms.gov

Diamondhead is a city in southeastern Hancock County, Mississippi, United States. The city is located just over 50 miles (80 km) northeast of New Orleans, Louisiana. It is part of the Gulfport−Biloxi Metropolitan Statistical Area. In February 2012, Diamondhead was officially incorporated as a city. In the 2020 USA decennial census, the city population was 9,529.

== History ==
=== Resort community ===
On October 25, 1961, NASA announced the formation of the Mississippi Test Facility, now the John C. Stennis Space Center. The center would be located in an area bordering the Pearl River in Hancock County. During and following the construction of the facility, an influx of government workers, contractors, and their families moved into the area.

Much of the land that became Diamondhead had been purchased by Walter Gex Sr., in 1937 from the Gulf State Paper Company and the Easy Opener Bag Company. Additional land was purchased by Gex, bringing his acquisition to nearly 5,000 acres (2,000 ha). In the late 1960s, D.E.A.R., Inc., later known as the Diamondhead Corporation, a large corporation interested in resort developments, began operations on the Mississippi Coast, with Diamondhead as its first project. Coastal Mississippi had been a popular vacation destination for years, particularly with Midwesterners. Its location was ideal as a second home development given the convenient access via Interstate 55. The land on which Diamondhead is located is the highest point of elevation (100 feet (30 m) above sea level) on the Gulf Coast in Mississippi. Therefore, the project was named "Diamondhead" after Diamond Head, an iconic volcanic cone on the Hawaiian island of Oahu.

Plans for the largest resort-type community in the southern United States were unveiled at a press conference in 1969. Hawaiian-style architecture, landscape, and road names were featured in the development. The company became interested in purchasing 6,000 acres (2,400 ha) of property adjacent to Interstate 10, which was still under construction in the Mississippi Coast area in the 1960s. The development would be located north of the Bay of Saint Louis, with 2 miles (3 km) of shoreline along the bay and 9 miles (14 km) of shoreline on the Jourdan River and Rotten Bayou. An interchange on I-10 would be located near the center of the development. When completed, Diamondhead was expected to represent a total investment cost of $10 million.

The corporation was scheduled to close on the purchase on August 18, 1969, one day after Hurricane Camille made landfall in Hancock County. Shortly after the storm left the area, the investment team was able to survey the damage and found that the area around current-day Diamondhead received far less damage than other coastal areas. Seeing such little damage from Camille, the investment team decided to go ahead with the project. Soon after, Diamondhead had streets, lots, infrastructure, model homes, a country club, an airport, a driving range, and a pavilion that would become the community center. Construction of I-10 to the exit at Diamondhead was completed in October 1970, allowing greater traffic access to Diamondhead. By June 1973, 3,700 lots had been sold and 31 homes had been constructed, with another 29 under construction. Diamondhead was responsible for much economic growth by creating opportunities for builders, tradesmen, and service industries related to the construction industry. The community also benefitted from other growth along the coast as employees from the Naval Oceanographic Office at Stennis Space Center, the Michoud Assembly Facility in New Orleans East, and other developments around the area chose to live in Diamondhead. By the end of the 1970s, 6,500 of the 10,000 lots offered at Diamondhead had been sold. Most of the early residents came from New Orleans, but later residents came from all over the United States. A survey taken in the late 1970s revealed that a large percentage of property owners came from New Orleans to escape overcrowding conditions.

Diamondhead was organized as a property owners association (POA). On January 1, 1985, the Purcell Company (formerly the Diamondhead Corporation) turned over the POA to a homeowner-elected board of directors. Diamondhead continued to grow after the turnover. As more people and families moved into the community, the demographics became more diverse and less of a second home for retirees. The demographic makeup of Diamondhead changed from that of a retirement community to that of any small suburban-type area. The population of the community became younger, with 54.6% of the population over age 45 in 2000, down from 61.1% in 1990. Tensions began to develop among different groups. Many began to question the POA's decisions, especially over increasing monthly dues and spending large amounts of money on golf course maintenance. In 1994, those who did not want the POA to lead the community began to advocate incorporation and conducted a petition drive for Diamondhead to become a city. This initial attempt at incorporation ultimately stalled but did not ease tensions between advocates and opponents.

=== Hurricane Katrina ===
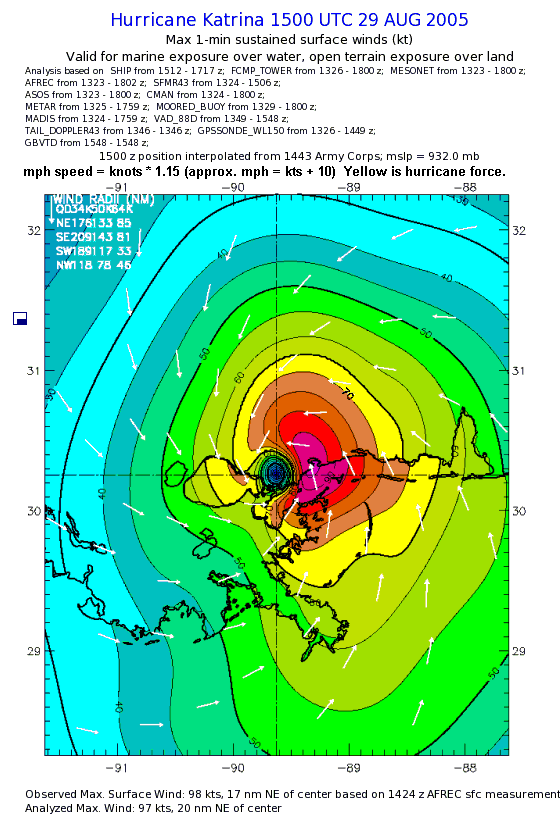
Diamondhead on top of small bay in fuchsia

On August 29, 2005, Hurricane Katrina made its third landfall on the Mississippi Coast. Before and during landfall, water poured into the Bay of St. Louis, and the initial flooding occurred in low-lying areas along the Jourdan River and its tributary bayous. Therefore, Diamondhead and Kiln began to flood before the bulk of the surge came. A record storm surge of nearly 30 feet (9.1 m) caused extensive damage. Many homes were badly damaged or completely destroyed, especially those homes on the south side of Diamondhead, facing the Bay of Saint Louis. The commercial center, including stores and restaurants, was mostly destroyed. A 1,000-gallon aviation fuel tank from the airport in Diamondhead floated onto I-10. The north side fared better, and many of the people whose homes had been destroyed in neighboring cities, as well as in Diamondhead, moved into the houses which remained on the north side. Overnight, the population swelled from 6,500 to 9,000.

=== Incorporation ===
Following Hurricane Katrina, the POA found itself facing issues that it had not anticipated that brought back the issue regarding incorporation. A city would be eligible for federal or state financial resources that the POA would not have access to as a private entity. Concerns about the expiration of the various covenants that governed different areas within the POA also created anxiety among homeowners. In July 2006, the POA commissioned a study to determine how to best protect its assets. The study ultimately determined that incorporation would be the best route.

In 2009, a petition supported by the Property Owners Association (POA) to hold an incorporation election was filed with the Hancock Chancery Court, and an election approved the incorporation. Opponents contended that the petition lacked a sufficient number of signatures and that incorporation requirements were not complied with. In 2010, the Hancock Chancery Court ruled against the opponents, who then appealed to the Supreme Court of Mississippi. The appeal further claimed irregularities during the hearing on the original objection. On October 29, 2011, the Supreme Court of Mississippi upheld the Hancock Chancery Court and ruled against the irregularity claims. In January 2012, a motion for extension to appeal the decision was denied by the Supreme Court, and a final edict mandating the incorporation was issued. The City of Diamondhead was presented its charter as the 111th city in Mississippi by Secretary of State Delbert Hosemann on February 6, 2012.

== Geography ==
Unlike most of the Mississippi Gulf Coast, which is relatively level, the Diamondhead area has more rolling topography, with elevations ranging from sea level to over 100 feet (30 m). The city is bordered to the south by the Bay of Saint Louis. Rotten Bayou runs west and northwest of the city. Harrison County borders Diamondhead to the east.

According to the United States Census Bureau, in 2010 the Diamondhead CDP had a total area of 11.7 square miles (30.3 km^{2}), of which 11.1 square miles (28.7 km^{2}) were land and 0.58 square miles (1.5 km^{2}), or 5.04%, were water.

=== Major highways ===
- Interstate 10 runs through the southern part of the city, with access from Exit 16. I-10 leads east 35 miles (56 km) to Biloxi and southwest 56 miles (90 km) to New Orleans.

=== Nearby cities and towns ===
- Bay St. Louis (11 miles [18 km] south by road)
- DeLisle (7 miles [11 km] east)
- Kiln (7 miles [11 km] northwest)
- Picayune (21 miles [34 km] northwest)
- Shoreline Park (6 miles [10 km] south)
- Waveland (10 miles [16 km] south)

=== Climate ===
The average temperature of Diamondhead is 67 °F, which is higher than the Mississippi average temperature of 64 °F and is much higher than the national average temperature of 54 °F.

Diamondhead

Climate chart (precipitation, max. and min. temperature)
J	F	M	A	M	J	J	A	S	O	N	D
5.5 59 41	5 62 44	5.7 68 50	5.5 75 57	5 82 64	4.8 87 71	6.7 89 71	6.4 89 71	5.7 86 69	3.1 78 59	3.9 68 48	5.1 60 42
- █ Average max. and min. temperatures in °F
- █ Precipitation totals in inches
- Source: WeatherBase.com (13 March 2021)
Metric conversion
J	F	M	A	M	J	J	A	S	O	N	D
140 15 5	127 17 7	145 20 10	140 24 14	127 28 18	122 31 22	170 32 22	163 32 22	145 30 21	79 26 15	99 20 9	130 16 6
- █ Average max. and min. temperatures in °C
- █ Precipitation totals in mm

== Demographics ==
Historical population
Census	Pop.	Note	%±
1980	1,011		—
1990	2,661		163.2%
2000	5,912		122.2%
2010	8,425		42.5%
2020	9,529		13.1%
U.S. Census data

=== 2020 census ===
As of the 2020 census, Diamondhead had a population of 9,529. The median age was 51.0 years. 18.2% of residents were under the age of 18 and 30.3% of residents were 65 years of age or older. For every 100 females there were 94.5 males, and for every 100 females age 18 and over there were 90.9 males age 18 and over.

94.9% of residents lived in urban areas, while 5.1% lived in rural areas.

There were 4,133 households in Diamondhead, of which 23.6% had children under the age of 18 living in them. Of all households, 54.9% were married-couple households, 15.1% were households with a male householder and no spouse or partner present, and 24.4% were households with a female householder and no spouse or partner present. About 28.2% of all households were made up of individuals and 16.4% had someone living alone who was 65 years of age or older. There were 2,630 families residing in the city.

There were 4,570 housing units, of which 9.6% were vacant. The homeowner vacancy rate was 2.5% and the rental vacancy rate was 11.4%.

Diamondhead racial composition as of 2020
Race	Num.	Perc.
White (non-Hispanic)	8,123	85.25%
Black or African American (non-Hispanic)	335	3.52%
Native American	39	0.41%
Asian	130	1.36%
Pacific Islander	2	0.02%
Other/Mixed	463	4.86%
Hispanic or Latino	437	4.59%

== Education ==
Diamondhead is served by the Hancock County School District.

All of Hancock County is in the service area of Pearl River Community College.

=== Local schools of note ===
- Hancock High School
- Our Lady Academy
- Saint Stanislaus College
