= Mississippi Highway 602 =

Highway in Mississippi

Mississippi Highway 602
- Flat Top Road
- MS 602 highlighted in red

Route information
- Maintained by MSHC
- Length: 12.9 mi (20.8 km)
- Existed: 1958–1967

Major junctions
- South end: MS 43 near Logtown
- North end: US 11 / MS 43 in Picayune

Location
- Country: United States
- State: Mississippi
- Counties: Hancock, Pearl River

Highway system
- Mississippi State Highway System; Interstate; US; State
← MS 601	→ MS 603

Mississippi Highway 602 (MS 602) was a highway in southern Mississippi. Its southern terminus was at MS 43, which is now inside the John C. Stennis Space Center. The road traveled a slightly curved route to its northern terminus at U.S. Route 11 (US 11) and MS 43 in Picayune. MS 602 was designated in 1958, only in Pearl River County. The route was extended south into Hancock County two years later. MS 602 was then removed from the state highway system in 1967, less than a decade after it was designated.

== Route description ==
As of 1965, the route was located in northwestern Hancock and southern Pearl River counties. MS 602 started at MS 43, where which is now part of the Stennis Space Center. The road, known as Flat Top Road, traveled northeast through the dense forest. About two miles (3.2 km) north of the southern terminus, MS 602 intersected Texas Flat Road. The road then crossed over Dead Tiger Creek, and shifted back slightly to the west. MS 602 crossed Stall and Everett Branches before turning northwest. It intersected Lott McCarty Road before entering Pearl River County. The route turned west shortly inside the county, traveling toward Picayune. A short section of the former route is now part of MS 43. As MS 602 entered Picayune, it became East Canal Street. The route ended at US 11, next to a railroad track. The road continued as West Canal Street. The road was maintained by the Mississippi State Highway Commission and Hancock County, as part of the state highway system.

== History ==
MS 602 first appeared in maps in 1958, connecting from MS 43 and US 11 in Picayune, to the Pearl River–Hancock county line. The route was fully paved at that time. Two years later, MS 602 was extended into Hancock County, connecting back to MS 43. The section was maintained by the county. The Stennis Space Center was built on a section of the route in 1965, and by 1967, the route was removed from the state highway system. MS 43 was rerouted onto a part of MS 602, bypassing the space center, while the old route of MS 43 through the space center was redesignated as MS 607.

== Major intersections ==
The route is documented as it existed in 1965.

County	Location	mi	km	Destinations	Notes
Hancock		0.0	0.0	MS 43	
Pearl River	Picayune	12.9	20.8	US 11 / MS 43	
1.000 mi = 1.609 km; 1.000 km = 0.621 mi

== See also ==
- Mississippi Highway 600
