= Mississippi Highway 603 =

Highway in Mississippi

Mississippi Highway 603

Route information
- Maintained by MDOT
- Length: 25.0 mi (40.2 km)
- Existed: 1950–present

Major junctions
- South end: US 90 in Waveland
- I-10 in Bay St. Louis; MS 43 in Kiln
- North end: MS 53 near Necaise

Location
- Country: United States
- State: Mississippi
- Counties: Hancock

Highway system
- Mississippi State Highway System; Interstate; US; State
| ← MS 602 | → MS 604 |

Mississippi Highway 603 (MS 603) is a 25.0-mile-long (40.2 km) state highway in Hancock County, Mississippi. The highway generally runs north–south from its southern terminus at U.S. Route 90 (US 90) in Waveland through Bay St. Louis and Kiln to its northern terminus at MS 53 near Necaise. The road is maintained by the Mississippi Department of Transportation (MDOT). MDOT and Mississippi's law code define MS 603's southern terminus as its intersection with MS 43 in Kiln. However, many maps such as Google Maps and MapQuest, and local signage show the highway continuing farther south to Waveland.' The road that became MS 603 has existed since 1927, and the highway was designated in 1950. The highway was also partially paved, from Waveland to Kiln, in 1950 and was completely paved in 1957. An interchange was created at Interstate 10 (I-10) in 1960.

== Route description ==
The entire route of MS 603 is in Hancock County. MS 603 starts at its intersection with US 90 and Nicholson Avenue in the northern part of Waveland and travels northwest for a half-mile (0.8 km) until it intersects with Longfellow Road, which intersects with US 90 further east in Bay St. Louis. MS 603 continues northwest before an intersection with Kiln Waveland Cutoff Road, which intersects with US 90 further west. From there, the highway travels near the unincorporated area of Shoreline Park and through Bay St. Louis, which annexed MS 603 north to the diamond interchange at I-10 around the turn of the 21st century. This section of MS 603 is also known as the Norton Haas Memorial Highway.

From the I-10 intersection, MS 603 travels northwest before reaching an intersection with a Stennis Airport Road, which leads to both Stennis International Airport and Hancock High School. Less than a mile north, MS 603 intersects with Texas Flat Road, which has an intersection with MS 607. The highway continues north, crossing Bayou LaCroix and entering Kiln, where it intersects with both Kiln DeLisle Road, which has an intersection with I-10, and Kiln Picayune Road, which intersects with MS 43. MS 603 travels north through Kiln until its intersection with MS 43. From there, the two highways overlap southward to the intersection with US 90.

From the intersection with MS 43, MS 603 passes through the rural areas of northern Hancock County. There are intersections with Cuevas Town Road and Dummyline Road, both of which intersect with MS 43 to the west. MS 603 travels further north until its T-intersection at its northern terminus with MS 53 near Necaise.

== History ==
In 1927, an unlabeled gravel road stretching from Waveland north to Necaise can be seen in the Automobile Blue Book and also on the Condition Map of State Highway System published by the Mississippi State Highway Department in 1928. The 1928 map shows the gravel road going through Kiln and north to connect to another highway, presumably MS 53, near Necaise. The first year that the Official Road Map of the State of Mississippi labeled the roadway as MS 603 was 1950. This was also the first year that part of the road, from Waveland at the south end to Kiln, was paved with a hard surface. In 1957, the rest of the highway from Kiln north to MS 53 was paved. On the Official Mississippi Highway Map of 1996–1997, for the first time, MS 603 was shown as a multi-lane road from the intersection with US 90 in Waveland north to an intersection with Stennis Airport Road in Kiln. The rest of the highway from the Stennis Airport Road intersection north to its northern terminus at MS 53 remains a two-lane highway to this day. On March 17, 1996, the section of MS 603 from the southern terminus to the intersection with I-10 was officially designated as the Norton Haas Memorial Highway.

== Major intersections ==
The entire route is in Hancock County.

| Location | mi | km | Destinations | Notes |
|---|---|---|---|---|
| Waveland | 0.0 | 0.0 | US 90 – Kiln, Picayune | Southern terminus of MS 603 and MS 43; southern end of MS 43 concurrency |
| Bay St. Louis | 5.4 | 8.7 | I-10 – New Orleans, Mobile | I-10, exit 13 |
| Kiln | 11.2 | 18.0 | MS 43 north – Picayune | Northern end of MS 43 concurrency |
| Necaise | 25.0 | 40.2 | MS 53 – Gulfport, Poplarville | Northern terminus |
1.000 mi = 1.609 km; 1.000 km = 0.621 mi: Concurrency terminus
