= Mississippi Gulf Coast National Heritage Area =

United States National Heritage Area in Mississippi

Coordinates: 30.499180°N 88.863795°W

The Mississippi Gulf Coast National Heritage Area is a federally designated National Heritage Area along the Gulf coast of Mississippi. The designated area of the Mississippi Gulf Coast comprises six counties recognized for their unique cultural and scenic qualities. The National Heritage Area designation provides a unified marketing and promotional framework for the region.

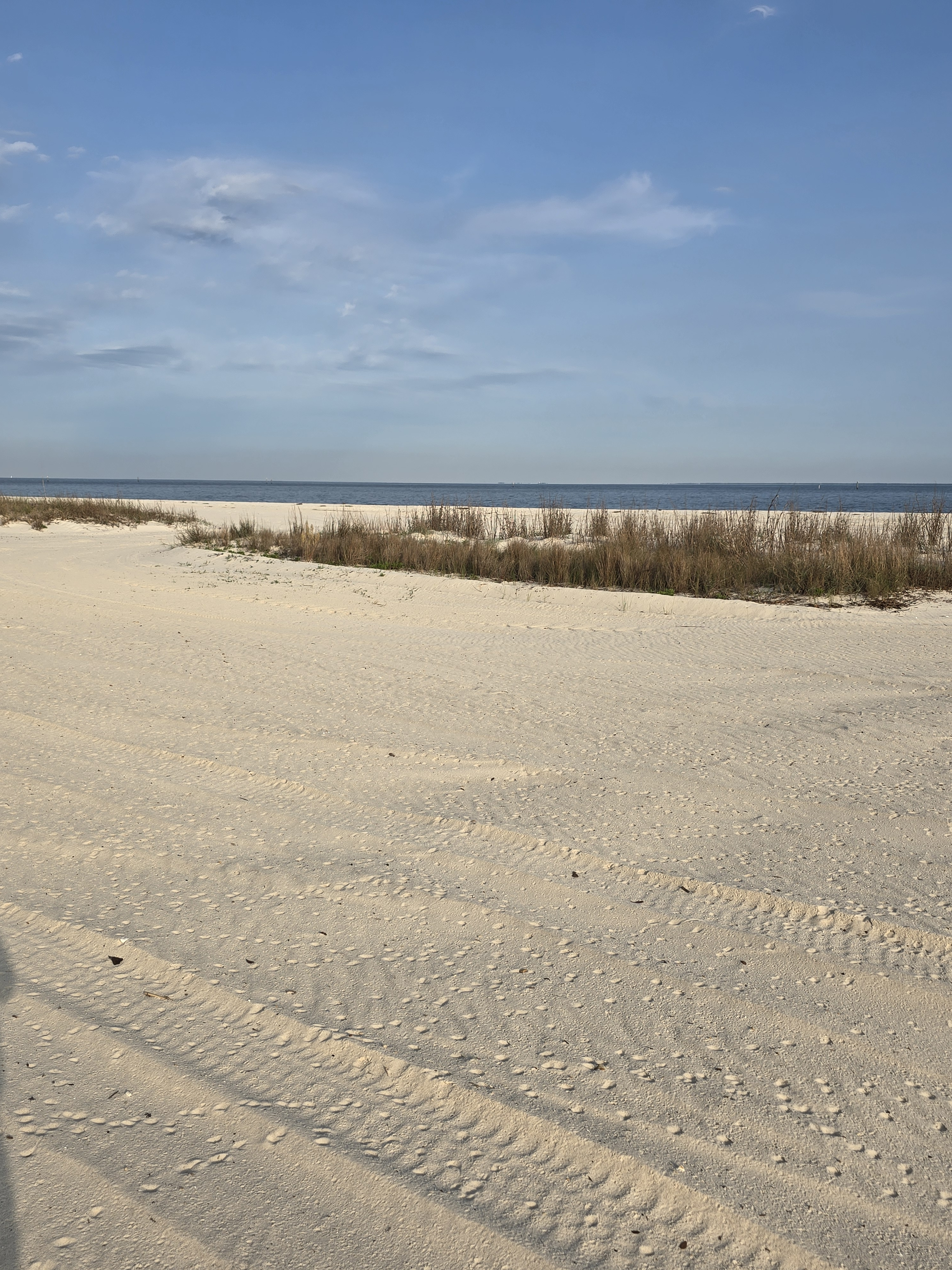
Pass Christian beach

The National Heritage Area comprises Pearl River, Stone, George, Hancock, Harrison and Jackson counties. It includes the Mississippi portion of Gulf Islands National Seashore.

The area was devastated by Hurricane Katrina in 2005. Much of the national heritage area's efforts since that time have focused on recovery and preservation and restoration of buildings and cultural resources damaged or lost in the storm.

The Mississippi Gulf Coast National Heritage Area was established in December 2004 by Public Law 108-447.

The Mississippi Gulf Coast National Heritage Area introduced a program for the Gulf Coast, creating a 'Passport to Adventure' where participants could head to different landmarks across the coast to receive a stamp. The program ran for the month of July 2024.
