= Leetown =

Leetown may refer to:

== United States ==
- Leetown, Arkansas, a village
- Leetown, Kentucky, an unincorporated community
- Leetown, Mississippi, an unincorporated community
- Leetown, Virginia, an unincorporated community
- Leetown, West Virginia, an unincorporated community

== Scotland ==
- Leetown, Perth and Kinross, a community
