= Hancock High School =

Hancock High School can refer to:

- Hancock High School (Chicago, Illinois)
- Hancock High School (Kiln, Mississippi)
- Hancock Place High School (St. Louis, Missouri)
- Hancock High School (Sneedville, Tennessee)
- Hancock Central High School (Sparta, Georgia)
- Hancock Central High School (Hancock, Michigan)
