= Wendell Ladner =

American basketball player (1948–1975)

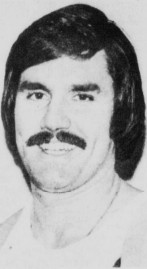

Personal information
- Born: October 6, 1948 Necaise Crossing, Mississippi, U.S.
- Died: June 24, 1975 (aged 26) Jamaica, New York, U.S.
- Listed height: 6 ft 5 in (1.96 m)
- Listed weight: 220 lb (100 kg)

Career information
- High school: Hancock North Central (Kiln, Mississippi)
- College: Southern Miss (1967–1970)
- NBA draft: 1970: undrafted
- Playing career: 1970–1975
- Position: Small forward
- Number: 33, 4

Career history
- 1970–1972: Memphis Pros
- 1972: Carolina Cougars
- 1972–1973: Memphis Tams
- 1973–1974: Kentucky Colonels
- 1974–1975: New York Nets

Career highlights
- ABA champion (1974); 2× ABA All-Star (1971, 1972); ABA All-Rookie First Team (1971)

Career ABA statistics
- Points: 3,474 (11.6 ppg)
- Rebounds: 2,481 (8.3 rpg)
- Assists: 621 (2.1 apg)
- Stats at Basketball Reference

Wendell Larry Ladner (October 6, 1948 – June 24, 1975) was an American professional basketball player most notable for his playing time in the American Basketball Association (ABA) from 1970 to 1975.

Ladner was born in Necaise Crossing, Hancock County, Mississippi and played high-school basketball at Hancock North Central High School in Kiln, Mississippi. After attending the University of Southern Mississippi, Ladner was undrafted in the 1970 American Basketball Association (ABA) draft but played forward for five seasons with four different teams (including Memphis twice) in the ABA from 1970 to 1975. At 6 ft 5 in (1.96 m) and 220 pounds (100 kg), Ladner was one of the more notorious enforcers of the ABA, protecting Dan Issel of the Kentucky Colonels and Julius Erving of the New York Nets. Ladner regularly faced perhaps the fiercest player in the ABA, the Pittsburgh Condors' John Brisker, once entering the Condors' locker room and yelling, "Hey, John, you wanna fight right now or wait for the game?" (It was not unusual for Brisker and Ladner to beat each other bloody on the court, only to hang out together at a local bar afterwards.)

Ladner was named to the 1971 ABA All-Rookie Team and was selected to the ABA All-Star Game in his rookie season. On January 24, 1971, he scored a career-high total of 34 points in a Memphis win over the Miami Floridians. He was also an all-star the following season.

Following his fifth professional season, Ladner was killed at age 26 in the crash of Eastern Air Lines Flight 66 on June 24, 1975. He was identified by medical examiners because he was wearing his ABA championship ring. Ladner was the only player in the ABA's nine-year history to die during his career.

The Nets' website used to include his name and number in their list of retired numbers, although Ladner's #4 was not displayed in the rafters with the other retired numbers. His number was also given to Rick Mahorn during his tenure with the Nets. In October 2013, a New York Daily News article explained that the number was never formally retired. However, as a tribute to Ladner, Nets trainer Fritz Massmann had not issued #4 to other players for 17 years after Ladner's death.

Erving called Ladner his most unusual teammate because Ladner wanted to be Burt Reynolds with a basketball. (Indeed, Ladner posed for a poster in only his gym shorts and a red-white-and-blue ball.) Semi-Pro, a basketball comedy set in the 1970s starring Will Ferrell, spoofs Ladner's Reynolds persona in its trailer.

A road in Perkinston, Mississippi has been named in Ladner's honor.

== See also ==
- List of basketball players who died during their careers
