= H. Weston Lumber Company =

American lumber company in Mississippi, 1889 to 1930

- Founded: 1889
- Founder: Henry Weston, Asa G. Weston, H. S. Weston, J. S. Otis and H. U. Beech
- Defunct: 1930
- Headquarters: Logtown, Mississippi, US
- Products: southern yellow pine lumber

H. Weston Lumber Company was established in Logtown, Mississippi and incorporated in 1889 to harvest old-growth longleaf pine (Pinus palustris L.) and sell finished lumber to national and international markets. The company's timberlands totaled about 150,000 acres (61,000 ha) in southwestern Mississippi and southeastern Louisiana, with additional land holdings in Oregon, Mexico, and British Columbia. The company experienced rapid expansion and was producing 30 million board feet of lumber per year in the early 1920s. The company was dissolved in 1930 as their supply of old-growth pine timber was depleted.

== History ==
H. Weston Lumber Company had its beginning in a Mississippi logging settlement that became known as Logtown, located on the bank of the Pearl River in Hancock County, Mississippi, where other lumber mills had been active since the mid-1840s. The river location allowed the rafting of harvested trees to sawmills for conversion into lumber. The river also emptied into the Gulf of Mexico, thus facilitating the transport of finished lumber on barges and ships to national and international markets.

The company founder, Henry Weston (b. 1823) was originally from Skowhegan, Maine, where he had labored in his father's sawmill. In 1844, he moved to Wisconsin in search of better opportunities in the lumber industries but could not tolerate the harsh winters. By 1846, Weston had relocated to New Orleans and easily found work as a lumberman.

In 1849, Weston was hired to work at an existing lumber mill in Logtown, about 50 miles (80 km) north of New Orleans, that was surrounded by what was perceived to be an inexhaustible supply of virgin southern yellow pines – principally longleaf. By 1856, Weston and two other men had acquired ownership of the Logtown lumber mill, but it was destroyed by fire in 1858.

Even though the lumber mill was rebuilt, it was shut down during the American Civil War. After the war, the mill reopened and was producing more than 5,000,000 board feet of lumber per year by 1870. Within four years, Weston had become sole owner of the mill and began buying more timberland and expanding the size of his Logtown lumber operations. Two of Weston's brothers had joined him, and in partnership with two other lumbermen, they incorporated the H. Weston Lumber Company in Logtown on February 20, 1889, with a branch office in New Orleans.

== Logtown ==
The small settlement, that would become Logtown had been established on the bank of the Pearl River around 1800, as loggers were attracted to the vast pine forests and the settlement's proximity to river transportation.

Following the incorporation of H. Weston Lumber Company, the Logtown community rapidly expanded with the construction of numerous buildings for businesses and public facilities – bank, grocery, school, hotel, churches and post office – to accommodate the influx of workers for the Weston sawmill. In 1900, the population of Logtown was about 200 but would eventually increase to about 3,000 in order to fulfill the labor requirements of the lumber mill.

== H. Weston Lumber Company expansion ==
In 1903, as income from their lumber products increased, the Westons began building railroad spurs beyond the Logtown mill, extending north and southeast so as to access old-growth pine forests that were isolated and far-removed from rivers and streams. By 1917, the company had about 50 miles (80 km) of rail track and operated 8 locomotives, 130 rail cars and 2 rail-mounted steam skidders. This expansion allowed the company to connect their spur lines to rail transportation systems owned by well-established regional railway companies.

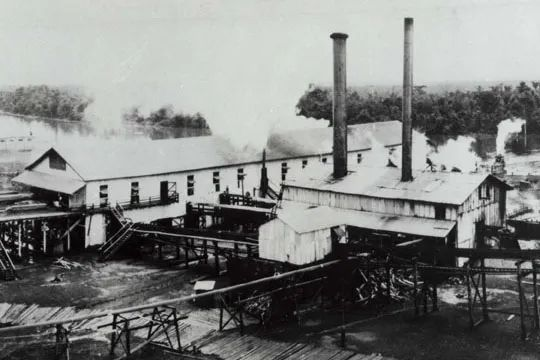
H. Weston Lumber Company sawmill in Logtown, MS 1928

Henry Weston died in 1912, and his sons continued to operate the lumber company. At the height of its operation in the early 1920s, H. Weston Lumber Company had become one of the largest sawmilling businesses in the United States by producing 30,000,000 board feet of lumber per year with landholdings totaling almost 2,000,000 acres (810,000 ha) in the states of Mississippi, Louisiana, and Oregon as well as in British Columbia and Mexico. The international markets for their pine lumber were concentrated in South America and Europe.

== Closure ==
After more than 40 years in business, the H. Weston Lumber Company suspended sawing operations in 1925, as their supply of virgin pines was exhausted on company landholdings of about 150,000 acres (61,000 ha) surrounding the Logtown mill.

In the late 1920s, H. Weston Lumber Company sold 20,000 acres (8,100 ha) of hardwood timberland to T. Hoffman-Olsen Lumber Company along with their Logtown mill and railroad spurs to facilitate the harvesting and processing of hardwood timber along the Pearl River. The balance of H. Weston timberlands in Mississippi and Louisiana were eventually sold to International Paper Company.

When it became obvious that the company's timberlands were being depleted, the Westons tried diversification by creating subsidiary companies to exploit their land holdings locally, in the Pacific Northwest, and in Mexico. Those subsidiary companies included:

- Weston Sand and Gravel Company
- Riviera Land and Improvement Company
- Louisiana-Mexican Timber and Investment Company
- Union Lumber Company

However, those business ventures were insufficient to support the financial needs of the Weston families under the harsh economic times brought about by the onset of the Great Depression. In 1930, the H. Weston Lumber Company began dissolution, and the company's extensive property holdings were sold off, often requiring decades because of the multinational corporate entities that had been created.
