= Hancock North Central High School =

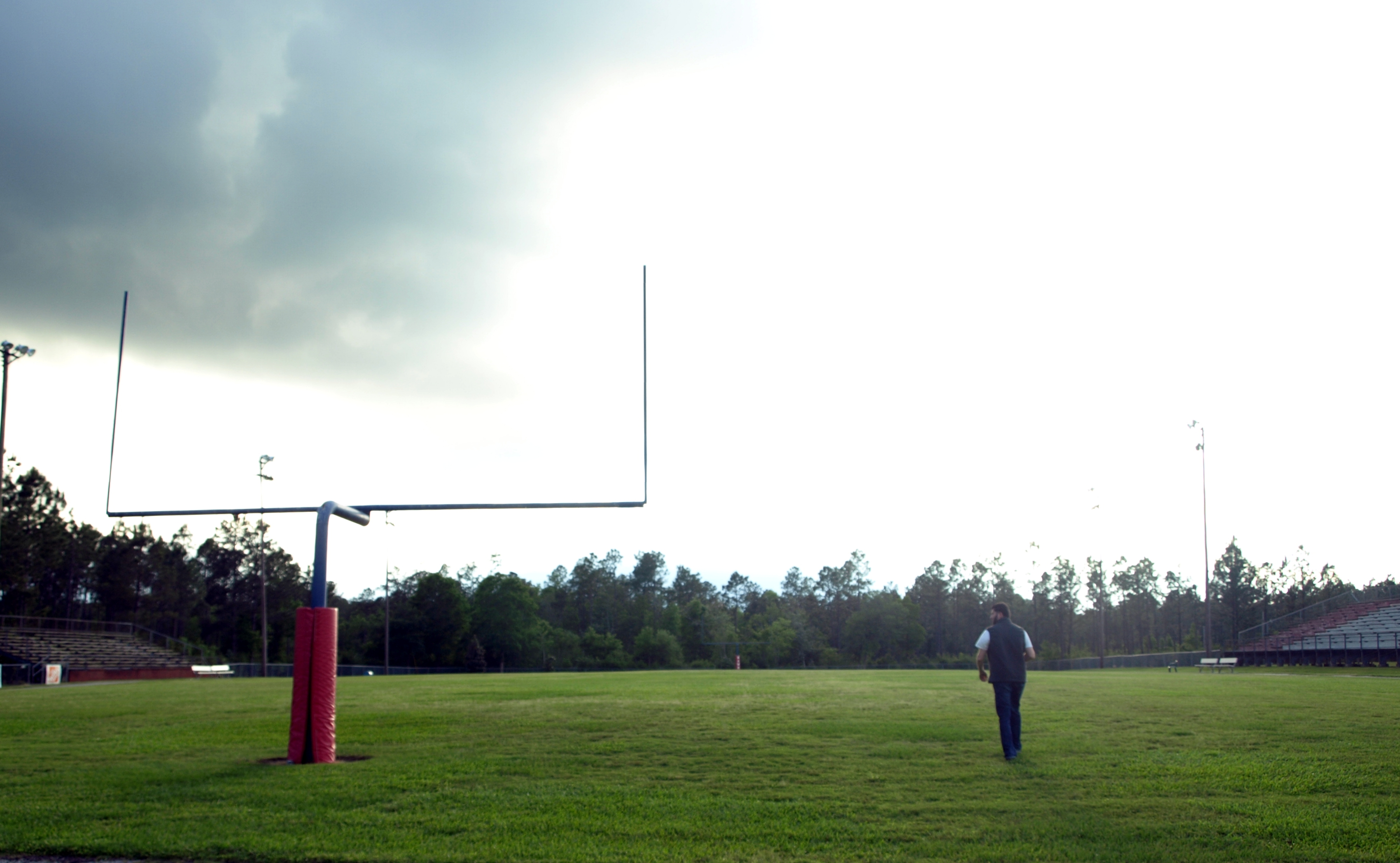
- The high school's former football field in 2013.

Location
- 6122 Cuevas Town Road; Kiln, Mississippi 39556; United States
- Coordinates: 30°30′08″N 89°26′16″W

Information
- Type: Comprehensive Public High School
- Opened: 1959
- Closed: 1990
- School district: Hancock County School District
- Gender: coed
- Colors: Red, White, and Blue
- Mascot: Hawks
- Last updated: July 2017

Hancock North Central High School was a high school in Kiln, Mississippi. The school first opened on August 28, 1959. The school's athletic teams were called the Hawks. Its most famous alumnus, NFL quarterback Brett Favre, played baseball and football at Hancock North Central, earning five varsity letters. The school is also the alma mater of former American Basketball Association standout Wendell Ladner. After a new high school was built, Hancock North Central High School became an elementary school.
