= George Austin McHenry House =

Historic house in Mississippi, United States

- U.S. National Register of Historic Places
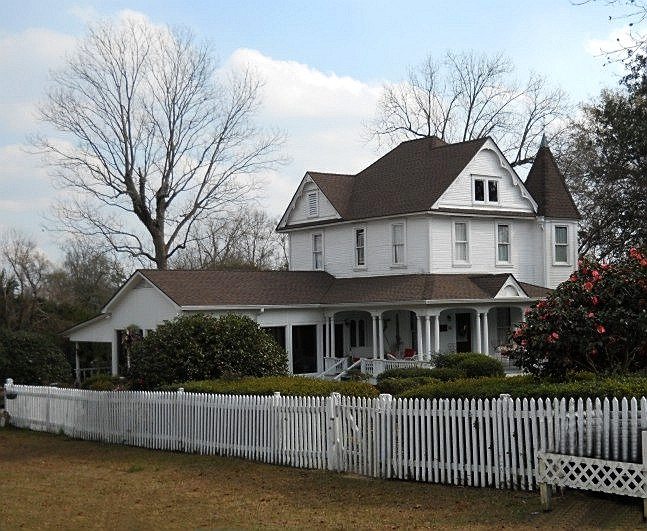
- George Austin McHenry House, 2013

- Location within Mississippi Location within the United States
- Location: McHenry Avenue at 5th Street, McHenry, Mississippi
- Coordinates: 30°42′29″N 89°08′18″W
- Area: 1.25 acres (0.51 ha)
- Built: 1895 to 1901
- Architectural style: Late Victorian with Queen Anne influence
- NRHP reference No.: 88002223
- Added to NRHP: November 3, 1988

The George Austin McHenry House is located in Stone County, Mississippi. It was constructed between 1895 and 1901 to serve as the family home of Dr. George McHenry. The structure was added to the National Register of Historic Places in 1988.

== Background ==
In 1889, Dr. George McHenry and his wife, Una, led a group of 54 families from Michigan to homestead in northern Harrison County, Mississippi. They settled in an area which would become part of Stone County, where the Gulf and Ship Island Railroad was under construction. George McHenry opened a general store and also handled the U.S. mail. A small town developed with timber-related industries that prospered because of the vast virgin pine forests of south Mississippi. A Post Office opened under the name of McHenry in honor of the settlement's founder. While Dr. McHenry was in military service during the Spanish–American War, his wife oversaw the construction and expansion of their family home.

== Description ==
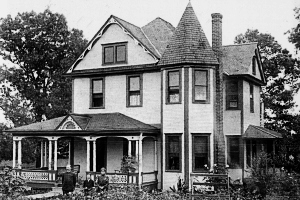
George Austin McHenry House, circa 1905

The house is a two-story wood-frame structure with a steep-pitched roof, three gable projections, and a single chimney. The first story was completed in 1895, but the second story was not added until 1901. The original design included a wrap-around porch which was later modified. The building was constructed with virgin yellow pine lumber and rests on brick foundation piers. A one-story rear addition was completed in 1957.

The house has been used continuously as a single family dwelling by descendants of Dr. McHenry. As of 2013, it was the oldest surviving structure in the town of McHenry.
