= Ansley, Mississippi =

- Unincorporated community
- Location within the state of Mississippi Ansley, Mississippi (the United States)
- Coordinates: 30°13′31″N 89°29′01″W
- Country: United States
- State: Mississippi
- County: Hancock
- Time zone: UTC-6 (Central (CST))
  - Summer (DST): UTC-5 (CDT)
- GNIS feature ID: 711723

Ansley is an unincorporated community in Hancock County, Mississippi, United States. It is located approximately 11 mi (18 km) west of Bay St. Louis.

== History ==
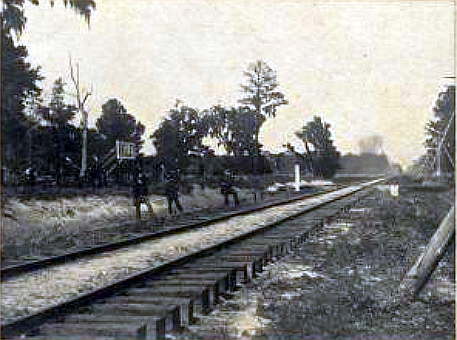
L&NRR through Ansley, Mississippi, circa 1900

Ansley was established as a flag stop on the Louisville and Nashville Railroad (L&NRR), which was constructed between New Orleans, Louisiana and Mobile, Alabama during 1869 and 1870. The community derived its name from M.M. Ansley, who was a railroad maintenance official for the L&NRR.

During the early years after its establishment, Ansley was a postal village.

== Hurricane damage ==
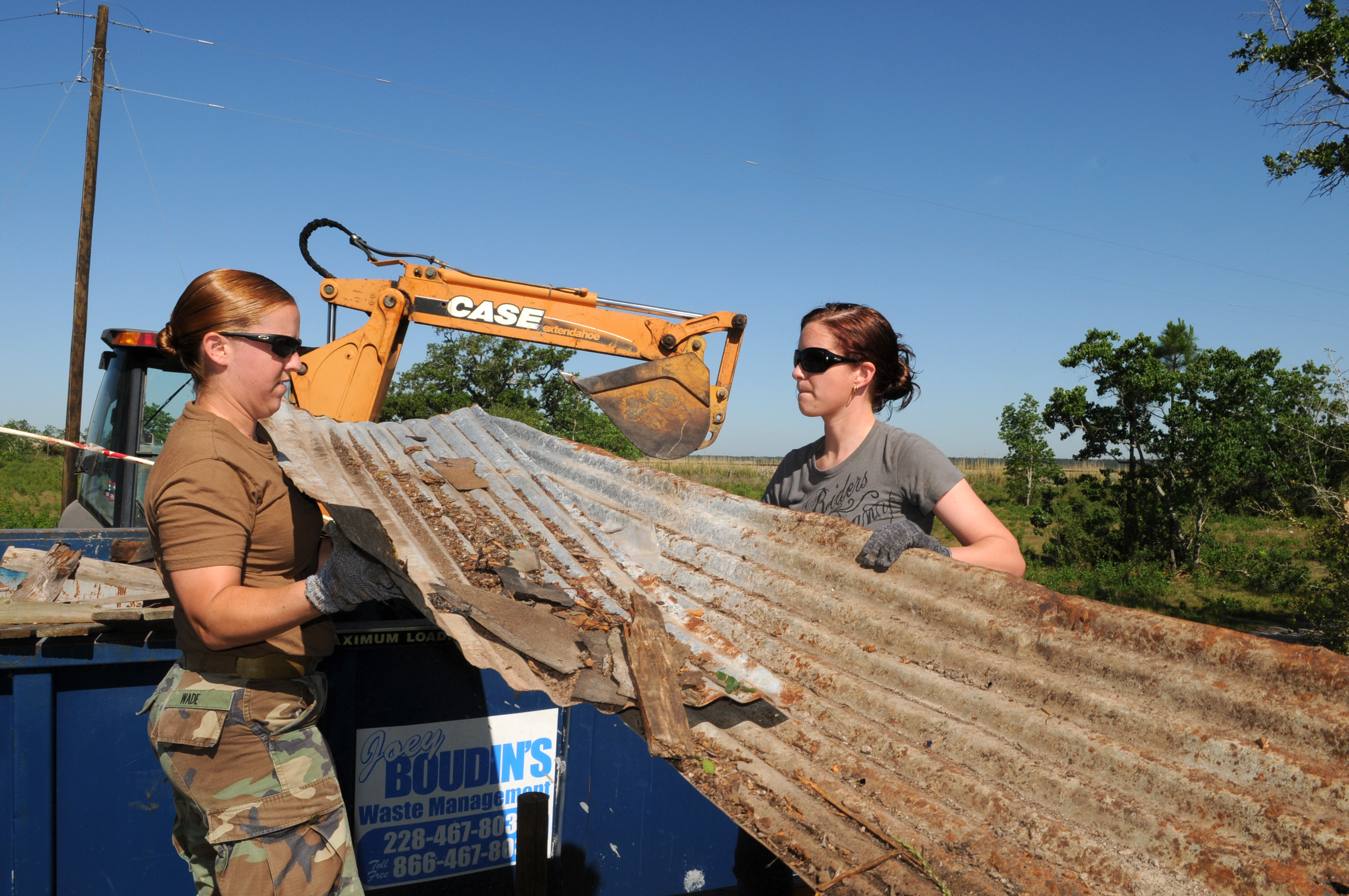
Seabees clear Hurricane Katrina debris from Ansley Preserve

Because of its proximity to the Gulf of Mexico and 7-foot (2.1 m) elevation, Ansley was reported to be destroyed by the tidal surge from Hurricane Katrina in 2005.

== Ansley Preserve ==
About 1 mi (1.6 km) southwest of the Ansley community is Ansley Preserve, a coastal chenier birding trail managed by the Mississippi Department of Marine Resources.
