= Dick Arrington =

American football player (1942–1993)

Profile
- Positions: G, and DT

Personal information
- Born: January 16, 1942; Kiln, Mississippi, U.S.
- Died: March 14, 1993 (aged 51); Roxbury, Boston, Massachusetts, U.S.
- Listed height: 5 ft 11 in (1.80 m)
- Listed weight: 232 lb (105 kg)

Career information
- High school: Erie East
- College: University of Notre Dame
- NFL draft: 1965: 18th round, 251st overall pick
- AFL draft: 1965: Red Shirt 4th round, 31st overall pick

Career history
- 1963–1965: Notre Dame

Awards and highlights
- Consensus All-American (1965)

Richard L. Arrington (January 16, 1942 – March 14, 1993) was an American football guard who played for the Notre Dame Fighting Irish football team. He was recognized as a consensus All-American in 1970.

== Early life ==
Arrington was born in Kiln, Mississippi in 1942. He would later move to Erie, Pennsylvania and graduate from Erie East High School.

== Playing career ==
Arrington played for the Notre Dame Fighting Irish football team under coaches Joe Kuharich during the 1963 seasons and Ara Parseghian during the 1964 and 1965 seasons. In 1964, as a starter on offensive line, he helped John Huarte win the Heisman Trophy. During the 1965 season, he was forced to play both ways when defensive right tackle Kevin Hardy was injured. Following his senior year, as a 5-foot, 11-inch, 232-pound guard, he was recognized as a consensus first-team All-American, having received first-team honors from several publications and organizations including the Associated Press (AP), and United Press International (UPI). In addition to being an All-American at Football, he also earned All-American honors in wrestling by placing 3rd in the 1965 NCAA wrestling tournament in Laramie, Wyoming. He is one of only four Notre Dame student-athletes ever to earn All-America honors in football and a second sport, joining Bob Golic, Raghib Ismail, and Edward "Moose" Krause.

== After college football ==
Arrington was drafted by the Cleveland Browns in the 18th round (251st overall) of the 1965 NFL draft. Instead of signing with Cleveland, he chose to sign a contract with the Boston Patriots of the American Football League. After football, he held several positions in state and local government including Boston Licensing Board commissioner, probation officer, and deputy tax collector for the Commonwealth of Massachusetts. On March 14, 1993, aged 51, Dick Arrington died of a heart attack at his Roxbury area of Boston home.
