= John Bond Jr. =

American politician

Lt. Col. John Bond Jr.
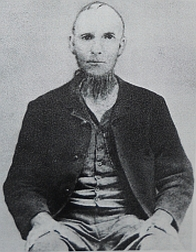
- John Bond Jr. (1770–1862)

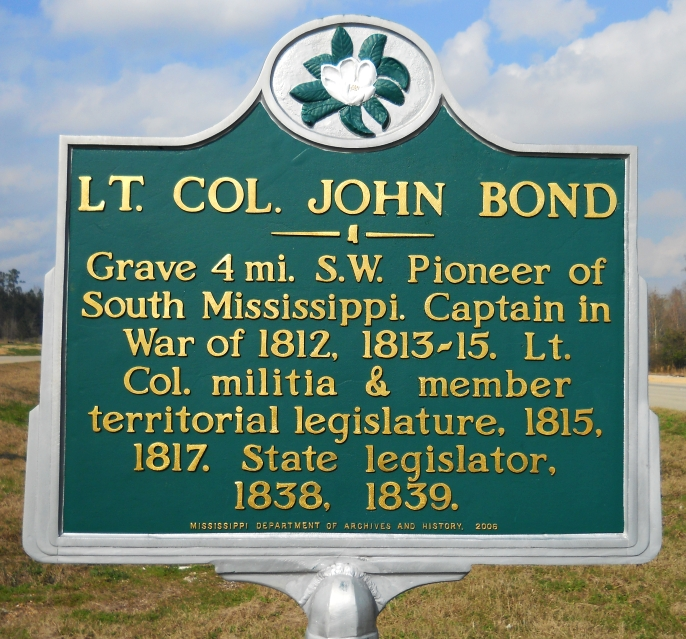
Historical Marker

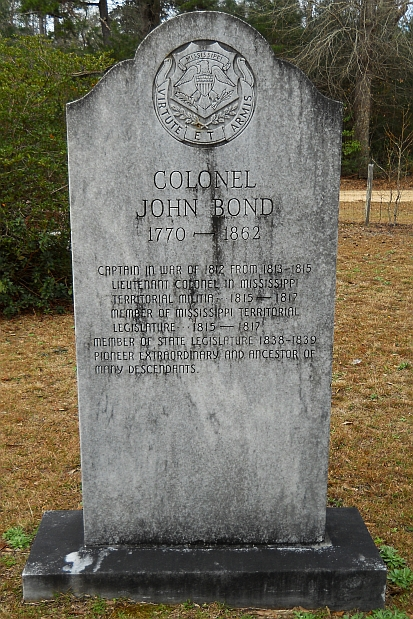
Lt. Col. John Bond Jr. Monument

Lt. Colonel John Bond Jr. (1770 − October 22, 1862) was an American military officer, Mississippi pioneer, and Mississippi legislator.

== Family ==
John Bond Jr. was born in 1770 to John Bond Sr. and Eleanor Peyton Bond in Beaufort, North Carolina. In August 1793, Bond married his first wife, Adelphia Batson, in Burke County, Georgia. By 1810, Bond had migrated to the Mississippi Territory in the vicinity of Marion and Covington counties. Bond was the father of eight children with three wives: Adelphia Batson (m. 1793—d. 1819), Elizabeth Wails (also Wayles) (m. 1821—d. 1834), and Sarah Largent (m. 1840—1862). Adelphia died from childbirth in 1819, and Elizabeth died from unknown causes in 1834.

== Military service ==
In 1801, Bond was commissioned a lieutenant in the Georgia Militia. Around 1813, after settling in the Mississippi Territory, Bond was commissioned captain in the 13th Regiment of the Mississippi Militia under the command of Colonel George H. Nixon.

In retaliation for the massacre of 500 settlers at Fort Mims, Alabama, Governor David Holmes mobilized the Mississippi Territorial Militia to assault the Creek Indians. Among the Mississippi military units responding was the 13th Regiment, including Captain John Bond's Company. The Creek Indian military action was under the command of General Andrew Jackson. By 1815, Bond had been commissioned lieutenant colonel in the Mississippi Militia, but resigned his military commission in 1817 because of "bodily infirmities".

== Mississippi Legislator ==
While still in military service (1815–17), John Bond represented Marion and Lawrence Counties in the Mississippi Territorial Legislature. In 1838 and 1839, Bond represented Hancock County as a member of the Mississippi Legislature. The geographic area where Bond served as Representative was to become part of Stone County in 1916.

In 1851, at age 81, Lt. Colonel Bond received a bounty-land warrant for his services in the War of 1812, and built a home on the property along Riceville Road, near what was to become McHenry, Mississippi.

Bond died in 1862 and was buried in Bond Cemetery, Harrison County, Mississippi. In the 1950s, a monument was erected by Bond's descendants at his gravesite.
