= McHenry, Mississippi =

- Unincorporated community
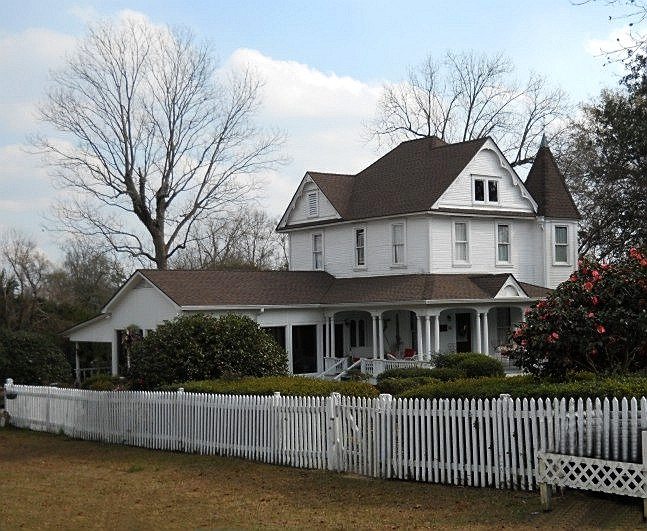
- George A. McHenry House in 2013

- Location within Mississippi Location within the United States
- Coordinates: 30°42′27″N 89°8′18″W
- Country: United States
- State: Mississippi
- County: Stone
- Elevation: 256 ft (78 m)
- Time zone: UTC-6 (Central (CST))
  - Summer (DST): UTC-5 (CDT)
- ZIP code: 39561
- Area code: Area code 601
- GNIS feature ID: 693920

McHenry is an unincorporated community in southern Stone County, Mississippi. It is situated approximately 10 miles (16 km) south of Wiggins and 3 miles (4.8 km) north of Saucier. The community is part of the Gulfport-Biloxi metropolitan area.

== History ==
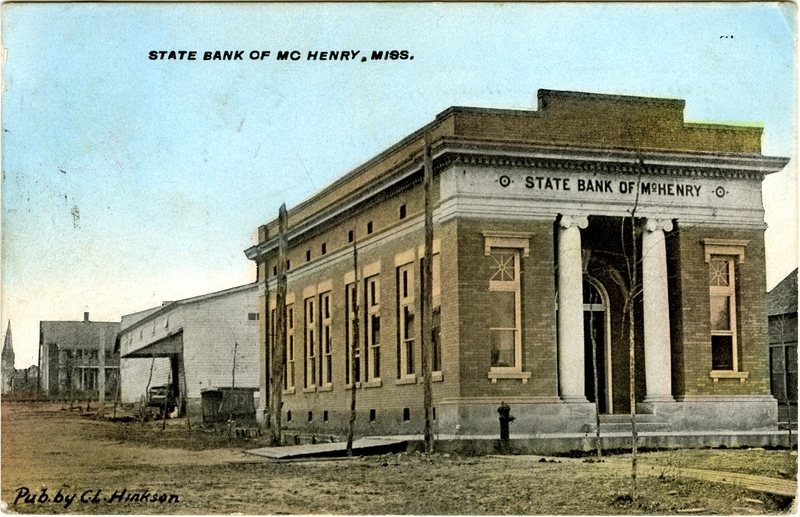
State Bank of McHenry, Mississippi, circa 1910.

The town of McHenry was settled by Dr. George McHenry in 1889. The town was situated in the longleaf yellow pine region where lumber mills and family farms were the principal forms of livelihood. In 1910, the town had several stores, churches, a school, a bank, and a newspaper office. The State Bank was established in 1902 with capital of $15,000. During that period, the town had a brickyard, and a large planing mill for lumber. With construction of the Gulf and Ship Island Railroad through the town in the 1890s, the population increased from 350 to about 1,200 in 1906. By the 1920s, the vast timber resources of south Mississippi had been depleted, and booming lumber towns, such as McHenry, faded rapidly.

A series of fires crippled the business district in McHenry and contributed to its demise. In 1903, a fire of unknown origin destroyed 17 businesses. In 1930, another fire almost destroyed the entire town. Then, in 1939, the main business district burned once again, and the town never recovered.

George McHenry's home is on the National Register of Historic Places listings in Stone County, Mississippi.

The grave site of Mississippi pioneer, Lt. Col. John Bond, Jr., is located approximately 4 miles (6.4 km) southwest of McHenry.

Due to its location just north of the Harrison County line, numerous modern residential subdivisions and some commercial uses have been developed in the McHenry area, particularly in the post-Katrina period.

== Education ==
- The McHenry community is served by the Stone County School District.

== Transportation ==
- Highway: U.S. Route 49.
- Railroad: Kansas City Southern Railroad.

== Economy ==
Anduril Industries operates a solid rocket motor facility near McHenry.
