= Napoleon, Mississippi =

- Unincorporated community
- Location within Mississippi Location within the United States
- Coordinates: 30°19′35″N 89°37′39″W
- Country: United States
- State: Mississippi
- County: Hancock
- Elevation: 16 ft (4.9 m)
- Time zone: UTC-6 (Central (CST))
  - Summer (DST): UTC-5 (CDT)
- Area code: 228
- GNIS feature ID: 692097

Napoleon is an unincorporated community located on the Pearl River in Hancock County, Mississippi, United States.

A post office operated under the name Napoleon from 1847 to 1905. After the post office closed, mail was routed to the post office in Huxford.

Napoleon was once home to a turpentine and camphine distillery.

Much of the community was abandoned after the creation of the Stennis Space Center.
