= Hancock County School District (Mississippi) =

School district in Mississippi, United States

The Hancock County School District is a public school district based in the community of Kiln, Mississippi, United States.

In addition to Kiln, the district also serves the communities of Diamondhead, Pearlington, sections of Waveland and Bay St. Louis, as well as portions of rural Hancock County. The area includes portions of the former Shoreline Park census-designated place.

== Operations ==
The district previously had its office at 17304 Highway 603 in Kiln.

== Schools ==
=== High school ===
- Grades 9-12
  - Hancock High School

=== Middle school ===
- Grades 6-8
  - Hancock Middle School

=== Elementary schools ===
- Grades K-5
  - East Hancock Elementary School
  - Hancock North Central Elementary School (formerly Hancock North Central High School)
  - South Hancock Elementary School (formerly Gulfview-Charles B. Murphy Elementary)
  - West Hancock Elementary School

=== Other Campuses ===
- Grades 10-12
  - Hancock County Career Technical Center

== Demographics ==
=== 2006-07 school year ===
There were a total of 4,265 students enrolled in the Hancock County School District during the 2006–2007 school year. The gender makeup of the district was 48% female and 52% male. The racial makeup of the district was 3.80% African American, 93.76% White, 1.36% Hispanic, 0.80% Asian, and 0.28% Native American. 63.2% of the district's students were eligible to receive free lunch.

=== Previous school years ===
School Year	Enrollment	Gender Makeup		Racial Makeup				
School Year	Enrollment	Female	Male	Asian	African American	Hispanic	Native American	White
2005-06	4,180	48%	52%	0.72%	3.49%	1.20%	0.19%	94.40%
2004-05	4,324	49%	51%	0.69%	3.79%	1.16%	0.23%	94.13%
2003-04	4,391	49%	51%	0.61%	3.64%	1.07%	0.30%	94.37%
2002-03	4,307	49%	51%	0.74%	4.11%	1.07%	0.23%	93.85%

== Accountability statistics ==
	2006-07	2005-06	2004-05	2003-04	2002-03
District Accreditation Status	Accredited	Accredited	Accredited	Accredited	Accredited
School Performance Classifications
Level 5 (Superior Performing) Schools	0	2	2	2	2
Level 4 (Exemplary) Schools	4	4	4	4	4
Level 3 (Successful) Schools	1	0	0	0	0
Level 2 (Under Performing) Schools	0	0	0	0	0
Level 1 (Low Performing) Schools	0	0	0	0	0
Not Assigned	0	0	0	0	0

== See also ==
- List of school districts in Mississippi
- Hancock North Central High School
