= George Austin McHenry =

Mississippi pioneer and physician

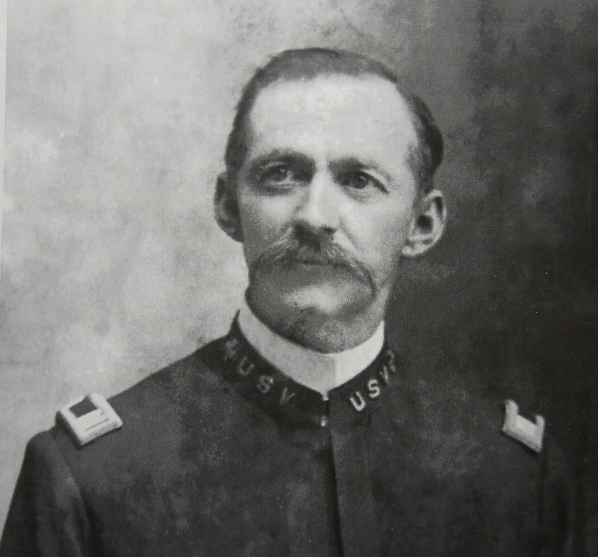
- George Austin McHenry in the United States Volunteers, circa 1900

George Austin McHenry (April 30, 1858 – October 11, 1931) was an American military officer, Mississippi pioneer, physician, and entrepreneur.

== Early years ==
George Austin McHenry was born April 30, 1858, in Seneca County, Ohio to Cornelius and Rebecca McHenry. He received his early education in Ohio and Indiana, and studied at the University of Michigan.

In 1881, McHenry married Eunice Whitaker at Angola, Indiana, with whom he had one child, Floyd Whitaker McHenry, born in 1891. The couple lived in Big Rapids, Michigan, where they owned and operated a pharmacy.

== Pioneer ==
In 1889, McHenry, his wife, and fifty-four families moved from Michigan to Mississippi in search of Homestead Land in the northern portion of Harrison County, near the Gulf and Ship Island Railroad, which was under construction between Gulfport and Hattiesburg. The location they selected became known as the Michigan Settlement, where McHenry and his wife built a General store to service the families and the booming lumber town that developed. When a Post Office opened, it was established under the name McHenry in honor of the settlement’s founder.

In 1893, George McHenry obtained his Doctor of Medicine degree from Louisville Medical College and attended Tulane University to become a surgeon. In 1895, he and his wife began construction of a new home in McHenry. George McHenry's home is on the National Register of Historic Places in Stone County.

== Military service ==
Dr. McHenry joined the United States Volunteers in 1898, as a contract surgeon with the rank of captain. He served in the Spanish–American War in Cuba, the Philippine insurrection, and in China. In 1903, Dr. McHenry was discharged from the U.S. Medical Corps with the rank of major.

While serving in the Spanish American War, McHenry developed a close relationship with Leonard Wood, who later became Chief of Staff of the United States Army and was tasked with establishing military training sites throughout the United States. Because of this relationship, Dr. McHenry was instrumental in proposing the establishment of one of these training sites to be located south of Hattiesburg, Mississippi, because of the mild climate, available rail facilities, and geography. The site was selected, and in 1917 it became Camp Shelby, the largest state owned military training facility in the United States.

== Physician and entrepreneur ==
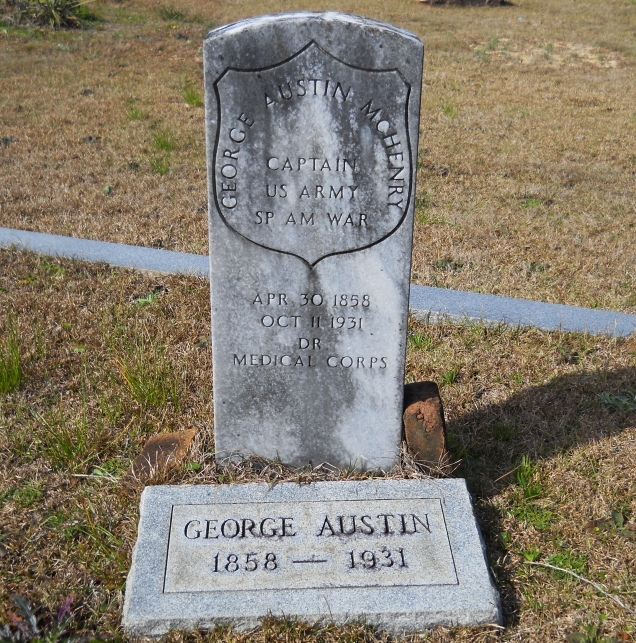
George Austin McHenry is buried in Oak Lawn Cemetery, McHenry, Mississippi

During military service in Cuba, Dr. McHenry was able to help victims of yellow fever because he was immune to the disease. After discharge from military service, Dr. McHenry returned to the town which he founded.

During the early years of the 20th century, Dr. McHenry and another entrepreneur acquired the Ramsey Springs property and promoted its spring water as a cure for stomach ulcers and skin diseases.

During his later years, McHenry dabbled in local politics, trying to prevent Stone County’s separation from Harrison County. Rather than splitting Harrison County, McHenry proposed two judicial districts for Harrison County, with the town of McHenry having the second courthouse. When McHenry’s efforts failed and Stone County was created in 1916, he sought to have the town of McHenry selected as the county seat, but was defeated by voters who chose Wiggins.

During the remainder of his life, Dr. McHenry attended to the medical needs of local citizens in the town of McHenry and surrounding areas. By 1926, George McHenry had suffered a stroke and died in 1931. He is buried in Oak Lawn Cemetery, McHenry, Mississippi.
