= Deanna Favre =

American activist (born 1968)

- Favre (right) in 2007
- Born: December 28, 1968 (age 57); Gulfport, Mississippi, U.S.
- Education: University of Southern Mississippi (BS)
- Known for: Breast cancer survivor and activist
- Spouse: Brett Favre (m. 1996)
- Children: 2

Deanna Farago Tynes Favre (born December 28, 1968) is an American author and founder and CEO of the Deanna Favre Hope Foundation. Favre was diagnosed with breast cancer in 2004, and later became an advocate in the fight against the disease.

== Early life and education ==
Favre was born in Gulfport, Mississippi. She was born to Kerry Tynes when he married Deanna's mother, Ann Tynes. Favre has a sister, Christie, and a brother, Casey. She met Brett Favre while growing up in Kiln; they had attended school together since early childhood, and began dating in high school during her sophomore and Favre's freshman year. After graduating from high school in 1986, she attended community college in Poplarville on a basketball scholarship, subsequently transferring to the University of Southern Mississippi to finish her degree. She graduated in 1994 with a degree in exercise science.

== Career ==
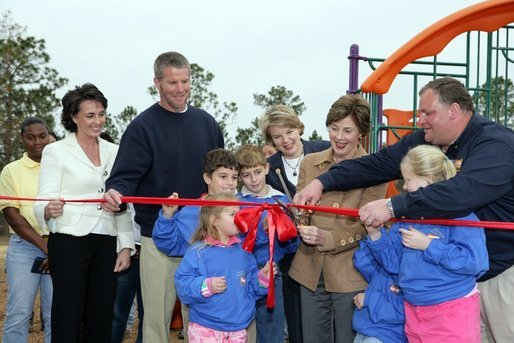
Deanna and Brett Favre, second and third from left, attend a ribbon-cutting ceremony with First Lady Laura Bush in Kiln, Mississippi after Hurricane Katrina.

In 2005, she began selling pink Green Bay Packers hats to raise money and awareness for breast cancer, which outsold regular Packers hats during the first half of 2005.

=== Deanna Favre Hope Foundation ===
Deanna Favre created the Deanna Favre Hope Foundation, which supports breast cancer education, women's breast imaging and diagnosis services for all women, including those who are medically underserved. The organization focuses on the needs of underinsured and uninsured women. The foundation has raised around $500,000 as of October 2007. Before starting her own foundation, she ran the Brett Favre Fourward Foundation, which has raised more than $3 million for disadvantaged or disabled children in Wisconsin and Mississippi.

=== Books ===
- Don't Bet against Me (October 1, 2007; Tyndale House Publishers; ISBN 978-1-4143-1907-0) - Favre's autobiography
- The Cure of the Chronic Life: Overcoming the Hopelessness That Holds You Back (co-authored with Shane Stanford)

== Personal life ==
At age 19, Deanna became pregnant and gave birth to Favre's daughter, Brittany Nicole, on February 6, 1989. As a single mother, she put herself through college while working various jobs, including working for a collection agency.

She moved to Green Bay, Wisconsin to live with Favre in 1995. Their relationship was strained during this time, which may have been related to Favre's newfound fame as an NFL quarterback and his addiction to Vicodin. Deanna said that Favre often ignored her and Brittany, describing him as "loud, rough, and often hateful." Deanna said she considered leaving Favre but worried that his addiction might become worse if she left. Favre, with Deanna at his side, publicly announced his addiction on May 14, 1996. Following his recovery, he credited Deanna as the reason he overcame the addiction.

During his recovery, Favre proposed to Deanna. She was uncertain at first, but agreed when he went to get a marriage license and she was told she needed to come in and sign it. Deanna Tynes and Brett Favre were married on July 14, 1996, at St. Agnes Catholic Church in Green Bay.

In 1999, the couple became estranged over Brett Favre's drinking problem. After she threatened to permanently leave him, he entered rehab for a second time and reportedly has not consumed alcohol since. Deanna and Favre's second daughter, Breleigh Ann, was born on July 13 of that year.

Deanna Favre made headlines in October 2004 after being diagnosed with breast cancer at the age of 33. As she underwent treatment, she began receiving letters from women throughout the country about how they had been motivated to get breast examinations after hearing her story. Following a lumpectomy and five months of chemotherapy, she made a complete recovery.

Deanna later described her relationship with her husband as stronger than ever. "All the stuff we've been through over the years has molded us into two different people. It's awesome to think where we started and where we are now ... [O]ur relationship has gotten to a much stronger point, a deeper love; we have so much respect and love for each other", she said in an interview.

On October 6, 2004, Deanna's 24-year-old brother, Casey Tynes, was killed in an all-terrain vehicle accident on the Favres' Mississippi property.

In late August 2005, the Favre home in Hattiesburg was damaged by Hurricane Katrina, though no one was injured. The couple housed 50 family members in their home during the storm.
