= Leetown, Mississippi =

- Unincorporated community
- Location within Mississippi Location within the United States
- Coordinates: 30°33′31″N 89°31′09″W
- Country: United States
- State: Mississippi
- County: Hancock
- Elevation: 154 ft (47 m)
- Time zone: UTC-6 (Central (CST))
  - Summer (DST): UTC-5 (CDT)
- Area code: 228
- GNIS feature ID: 689414

Leetown is an unincorporated community in Hancock County, Mississippi, United States.
