= Bay St. Louis-Waveland School District =

School district in Mississippi, United States

Location
- Bay St. Louis, Mississippi; United States

District information
- Schools: 4
- NCES District ID: 2800570

Students and staff
- Students: 1678
- Teachers: 140.20 FTE

Other information
- Website: https://www.bwsd.org/en

The Bay St. Louis-Waveland School District is a public school district based in Bay St. Louis, Mississippi (USA).

In addition to almost all of Bay St. Louis, the district serves most the city of Waveland. It includes a part of the former Shoreline Park census-designated place.

== Schools ==
- Bay High School (Bay St. Louis; Grades 9-12)
- Bay-Waveland Middle School (Bay St. Louis; Grades 6-8)
- North Bay Elementary School (Bay St. Louis; Grades 3-5)
- Waveland Elementary School (Waveland; Grades K-2)

== Demographics ==
=== 2006-07 school year ===
There were a total of 1,624 students enrolled in the Bay St. Louis-Waveland School District during the 2006–07 school year. The gender makeup of the district was 50% female and 50% male. The racial makeup of the district was 20.07% African American, 76.23% White, 2.28% Hispanic, 1.29% Asian, and 0.12% Native American. 88.2% of the district's students were eligible to receive free lunch.

=== Previous school years ===
School Year	Enrollment	Gender Makeup		Racial Makeup				
School Year	Enrollment	Female	Male	Asian	African American	Hispanic	Native American	White
2005-06	1,441	51%	49%	1.39%	15.48%	1.67%	0.21%	81.26%
2004-05	2,383	49%	51%	1.38%	20.86%	1.22%	0.17%	76.37%
2003-04	2,253	50%	50%	1.82%	20.77%	1.42%	0.36%	75.63%
2002-03	2,208	49%	51%	1.45%	19.88%	1.49%	0.45%	76.72%

== Accountability statistics ==
	2006-07	2005-06	2004-05	2003-04	2002-03
District Accreditation Status	Accredited	Accredited	Accredited	Accredited	Accredited
School Performance Classifications
Level 5 (Superior Performing) Schools	1	2	0	2	1
Level 4 (Exemplary) Schools	1	3	3	3	3
Level 3 (Successful) Schools	3	0	2	0	1
Level 2 (Under Performing) Schools	0	0	0	0	0
Level 1 (Low Performing) Schools	0	0	0	0	0
Not Assigned	0	0	0	0	0

== See also ==
- List of school districts in Mississippi
