= Logtown, Mississippi =

- Ghost town
- Location within Mississippi
- Coordinates: 30°16′59″N 89°37′16″W
- Country: United States
- State: Mississippi
- County: Hancock
- Elevation: 6.6 ft (2 m)
- Time zone: UTC-6 (Central (CST))
  - Summer (DST): UTC-5 (CDT)
- GNIS feature ID: 672774

Logtown, Mississippi is a ghost town located in Hancock County, Mississippi. It is one of several ghost towns situated within the 125,000 acre acoustic buffer zone of NASA's John C. Stennis Space Center. It stood along the banks of the Pearl River and had been the site of a very large sawmill and logging community.

== History ==
Formerly known as Cabanage Latanier, meaning "palmetto camp", much of the early European history is unknown. The earliest person to own land in the area was Jean Baptiste Rousseve. In 1788, Rousseve was granted 1000 arpens in the area and built a house at what would become Logtown. In 1805, Rousseve transferred his claim to Joseph Challon, and the Challon name was associated with the town into the twentieth century. As the timber industry built the town into a major population in the nineteenth century, the town was named Logtown.

The town's economy relied on logging and lumber shipping. The first sawmill was built in 1845 by E. G. Goddard of Michigan. In 1889, Henry Weston founded the H. Weston Lumber Company. At the time it was America's largest lumber company, employing 1,200 men, using over 20 barges and four two-masted schooners, and at its peak supporting a community of over 3,000 people.

In 1906, Logtown had a population of 500 and was home to two churches, two stores, and an express mail office.

The H. Weston Lumber Company operated in Logtown until 1930. By then, all of the usable and merchantable lumber had been exhausted, and the town population rapidly declined, along with its industrial importance. By 1961, there were about 250 residents. After the construction of the Stennis Space Center, most of the remaining residents left Logtown.

A post office operated under the name Logtown from 1884 to 1963.

== Today ==
Today, the only thing left untouched is the Logtown cemeteries. There are three privately owned family cemeteries with graves dating back as early as the 1850s. Along the Pearl River you can find an artesian well and concrete and brick structures that were once the foundations of some of the buildings. Snaking through the pine and hardwood forest is the Possum Walk Trail, a 3 mile hiking trail stretching in between the Nasa Infinity Science Center and Logtown. Along the trail you can find many signs telling Logtown's history and even see remnants of the historic Dummy Line railroad.

== Notes ==
- "Logtown". NASA. July 1, 2014. Archived from the original on July 12, 2010.
