= Necaise, Mississippi =

- Unincorporated community
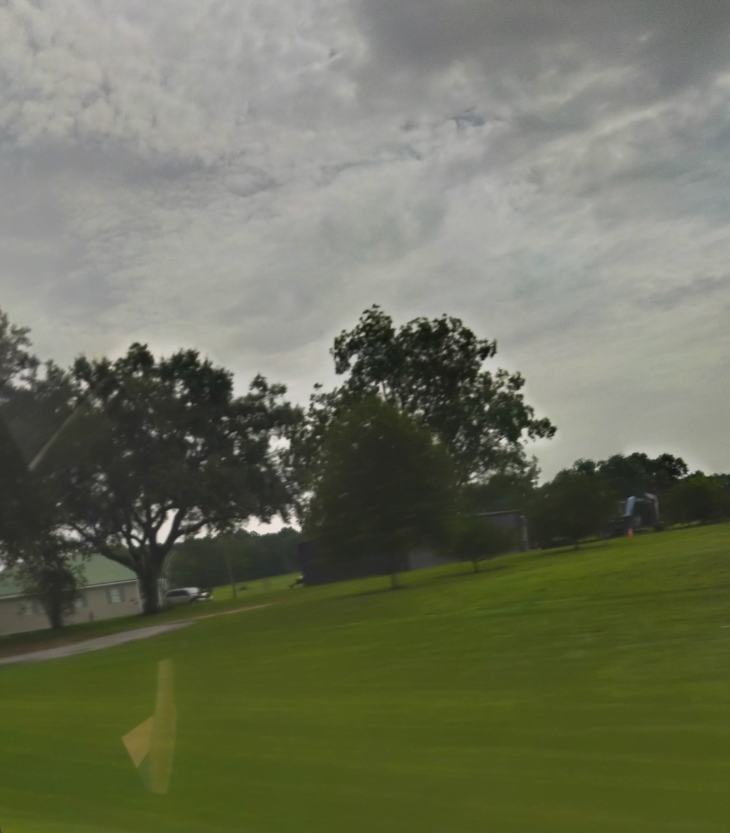
- Nickname: Necaise Crossing
- Location within Mississippi
- Coordinates: 30°36′07″N 89°24′51″W
- Country: United States
- State: Mississippi
- County: Hancock
- Elevation: 187 ft (57 m)
- Time zone: UTC-6 (Central (CST))
  - Summer (DST): UTC-5 (CDT)
- GNIS feature ID: 674537

Necaise, or Necaise Crossing, is an unincorporated community in Hancock County, Mississippi, United States.

== Notable people ==
- Wendell Ladner (1948–1975), basketball player
