= Shoreline Park, Mississippi =

Former census-designated place in Mississippi, US

- Former CDP
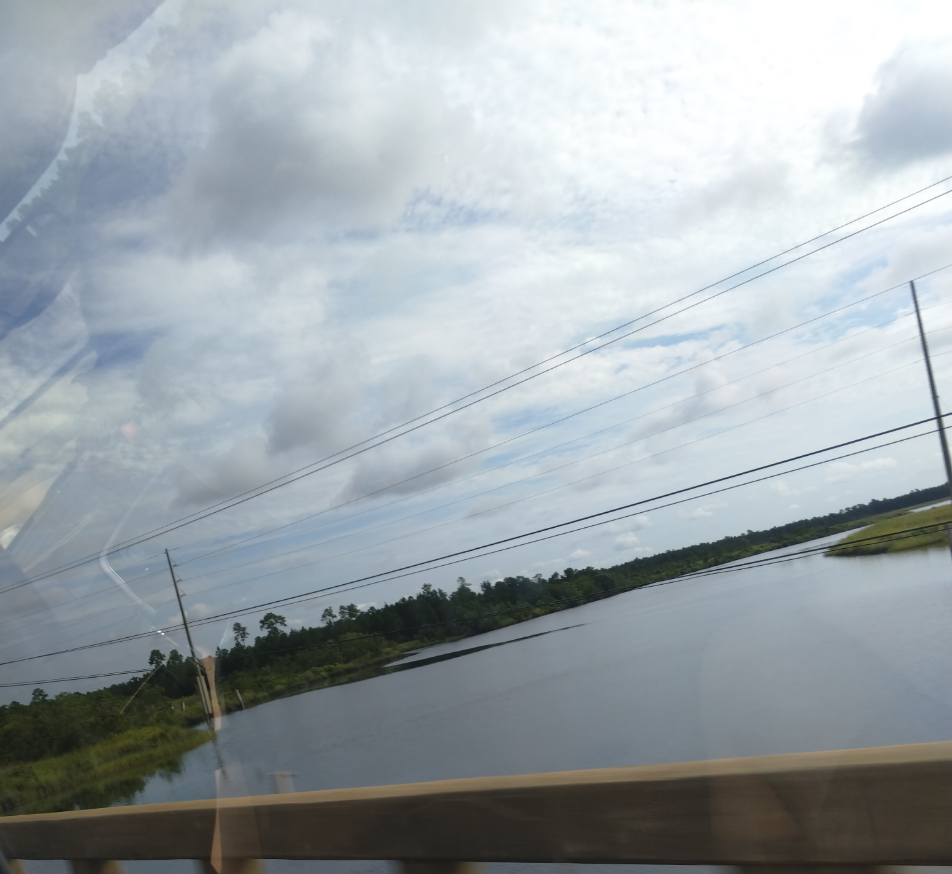

- Location of Shoreline Park, Mississippi

- Location in the United States
- Coordinates: 30°19′17″N 89°24′20″W
- Country: United States
- State: Mississippi
- County: Hancock

Area
  - Total: 8.0 sq mi (20.8 km^{2})
  - Land: 7.8 sq mi (20.3 km^{2})
  - Water: 0.19 sq mi (0.5 km^{2})

Population (2000)
  - Total: 4,058
  - Density: 518/sq mi (199.9/km^{2})
- Time zone: UTC-6 (Central (CST))
  - Summer (DST): UTC-5 (CDT)
- FIPS code: 28-67435

Shoreline Park is a former census-designated place (CDP) in Hancock County, Mississippi. It is part of the Gulfport–Biloxi, Mississippi Metropolitan Statistical Area. The population was 4,058 at the 2000 census. It was not included in the 2010 census. The area is now largely within the city limits of Bay St. Louis, although some of the western side of the former CDP is still unincorporated after Hurricane Katrina in 2005.

== Geography ==
Shoreline Park is located at 30°19'17" North, 89°24'20" West (30.321322, -89.405565).

According to the United States Census Bureau, the CDP had a total area of 8.0 square miles (21 km^{2}), of which 7.8 square miles (20 km^{2}) is land and 0.2 square miles (0.52 km^{2}) (2.49%) is water.

== Demographics ==
As of the census of 2000, there were 4,058 people, 1,649 households, and 1,119 families residing in the CDP. The population density was 517.7 inhabitants per square mile (199.9/km^{2}). There were 2,459 housing units at an average density of 313.7 per square mile (121.1/km^{2}). The racial makeup of the CDP was 94.55% White, 2.00% Black or African American, 1.03% Native American, 0.32% Asian, none Pacific Islander, 0.34% from other races, and 1.75% from two or more races. Hispanic or Latino of any race were 1.95% of the population.

There were 1,649 households, out of which 28.1% had children under the age of 18 living with them, 51.4% were married couples living together, 10.1% had a female householder with no husband present, and 32.1% were non-families. 25.2% of all households were made up of individuals, and 6.7% had someone living alone who was 65 years of age or older. The average household size was 2.46 and the average family size was 2.90.

In the CDP, the population was spread out, with 22.9% under the age of 18, 7.5% from 18 to 24, 28.7% from 25 to 44, 30.7% from 45 to 64, and 10.2% who were 65 years of age or older. The median age was 40 years. For every 100 females, there were 110.7 males. For every 100 females age 18 and over, there were 109.5 males.

The median income for a household in the CDP was $28,258, and the median income for a family was $29,680. Males had a median income of $27,234 versus $21,516 for females. The per capita income for the CDP was $13,984. About 12.4% of families and 17.6% of the population were below the poverty line, including 27.7% of those under age 18 and 4.6% of those age 65 or over.

== Education ==
The former Shoreline Park CDP is divided between the Bay St. Louis-Waveland and Hancock County school districts.
