= Hancock County, Mississippi =

County in Mississippi, United States

- County
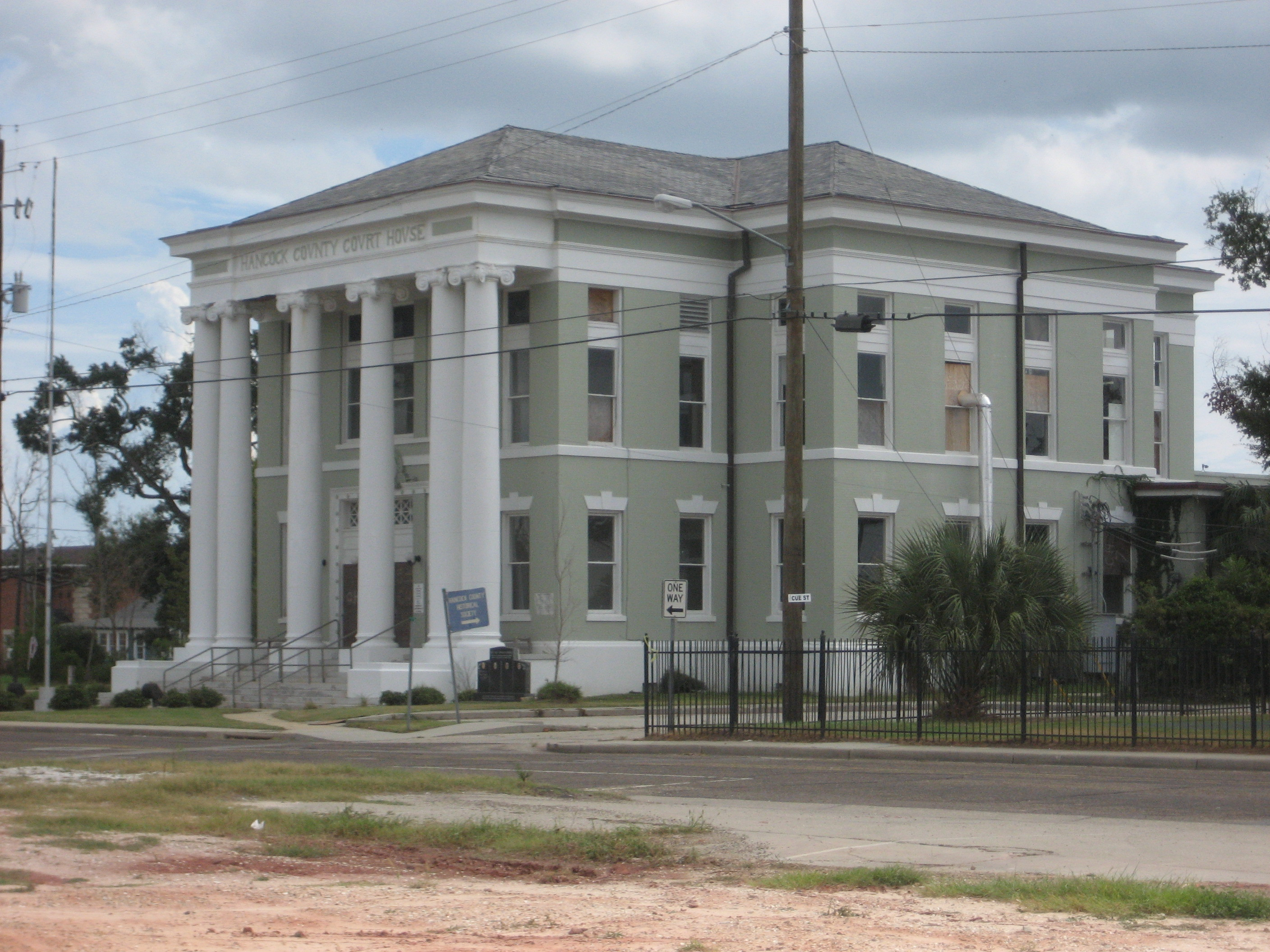
- Hancock County Courthouse in Bay St. Louis

- Location within the U.S. state of Mississippi
- Coordinates: 30°23′N 89°28′W
- Country: United States
- State: Mississippi
- Founded: 1812
- Named for: John Hancock
- Seat: Bay St. Louis
- Largest city: Bay St. Louis

Area
  - Total: 553 sq mi (1,430 km^{2})
  - Land: 474 sq mi (1,230 km^{2})
  - Water: 79 sq mi (200 km^{2}) 14%

Population (2020)
  - Total: 46,053
  - Estimate (2025): 46,873 ▲
  - Density: 97.2/sq mi (37.5/km^{2})
- Time zone: UTC−6 (Central)
  - Summer (DST): UTC−5 (CDT)
- Congressional district: 4th
- Website: hancockcounty.ms.gov

Hancock County is the southernmost county of the U.S. state of Mississippi and is named for Founding Father John Hancock. As of the 2020 census, the population was 46,053. Its county seat is Bay St. Louis. Hancock County is part of the Gulfport–Biloxi, MS Metropolitan Statistical Area. It is situated along the Gulf of Mexico and the state line with Louisiana. The area is home to the John C. Stennis Space Center, NASA's largest rocket engine test facility. The county was severely damaged from Hurricane Katrina on August 29, 2005, which caused a huge storm surge and catastrophic damage.

== History ==
This area of Mississippi was inhabited by indigenous peoples at the time of European colonization; the French were the first settlers and traders in the area. They imported African slaves as laborers, and in time a Creole class of free people of color developed.

After the United States conducted Indian Removal in the 1830s, more Protestant Americans migrated into this area, but it retained French and African Catholic influences. Located on the Gulf Coast, the county was regularly hit by hurricanes but its residents learned to handle these incidents.

In 2005, the county was the scene of the final landfall of the eye of Hurricane Katrina, and its communities and infrastructure suffered some of the most intense damage inflicted by that storm. Over the entire 7-mile (11 km) beach front, not one building or home was left intact. Nearly the entire first block off the beach was destroyed for the entire 7-mile (11 km) stretch.

Homes as far inland as 10 miles (16 km) were flooded by the historic storm surge, which occurred during a full moon high tide. All rivers and waterways were inundated by the surge. Highway 603 south from Interstate 10 was completely submerged, and the Highway 90 - Bay St. Louis Bridge was left looking like a stack of dominoes.

Houses were floated off their foundations. In Waveland and Bay St. Louis, some homes were stranded atop the railroad tracks and others in the middle of streets. Towns like Pearlington, Waveland, Bay St. Louis, Diamondhead, and Kiln suffered catastrophic damage.

=== Recovery from Hurricane Katrina ===
A loosely knit group of hippies called the "Rainbow Family" arrived in Hancock County soon after Hurricane Katrina. From early September 2005 to early December 2005, they ran the "New Waveland Cafe and Clinic" located in the parking lot of Fred's Dept Store on Highway 90.

The café provided free hot meals three times a day. The clinic was staffed by volunteer doctors and nurses from around the United States who saw more than 5000 patients during the duration. They provided treatment free of charge and dispensed free medications. Donations of medications and supplies came from a multitude of sources, with International Aid arranging the most donations. This was the first experience of the Rainbow Family in running a disaster relief center. The Bastrop Christian Outreach Center also volunteered with the Rainbow Family.

Local churches were central points of recovery in Bay St. Louis, Waveland, and Diamondhead. Some churches provided shelter, meals, clothing, and various clean-up supplies. The churches also provided distribution points where supplies could be donated and easily passed on to those who needed help. Other disaster relief agencies that were active in Hancock County include Samaritan's Purse, Southern Baptist Convention Disaster Relief, Red Cross, Rotary International and Salvation Army.

Businesses became operational as quickly as possible. The Waveland Wal-Mart operated out of a tent for 3 months following the storm; Diamondhead Discount Drug was opened within 2 days following Katrina, although the owner's store and home were both severely damaged. Other business such as Dairy Queen and Subway donated their foodstuffs, before it could spoil, in order to feed survivors.

== Geography ==
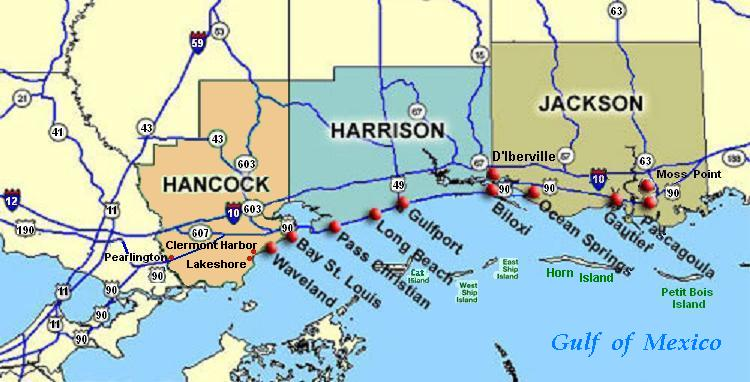
Coastal counties of Mississippi.

According to the U.S. Census Bureau, the county has a total area of 553 square miles (1,430 km^{2}), of which 474 square miles (1,230 km^{2}) is land and 79 square miles (200 km^{2}) (14%) is water.

=== Major highways ===
- Interstate 10
- U.S. Highway 90
- Mississippi Highway 43
- Mississippi Highway 53
- Mississippi Highway 603
- Mississippi Highway 607

=== Adjacent counties and parishes ===
- Pearl River County (north)
- Harrison County (east)
- St. Bernard Parish, Louisiana (south)
- St. Tammany Parish, Louisiana (west)

== Demographics ==
Historical population
Census	Pop.	Note	%±
1820	1,594		—
1830	1,962		23.1%
1840	3,367		71.6%
1850	3,672		9.1%
1860	3,139		−14.5%
1870	4,239		35.0%
1880	6,439		51.9%
1890	8,318		29.2%
1900	11,886		42.9%
1910	11,207		−5.7%
1920	10,380		−7.4%
1930	11,415		10.0%
1940	11,328		−0.8%
1950	11,891		5.0%
1960	14,039		18.1%
1970	17,387		23.8%
1980	24,537		41.1%
1990	31,760		29.4%
2000	42,967		35.3%
2010	43,929		2.2%
2020	46,053		4.8%
2025 (est.)	46,873	▲	1.8%
U.S. Decennial Census; 1790-1960 1900-1990; 1990-2000 2010-2013 2019

=== Racial and ethnic composition ===
Hancock County, Mississippi – Racial and ethnic composition Note: the US Census treats Hispanic/Latino as an ethnic category. This table excludes Latinos from the racial categories and assigns them to a separate category. Hispanics/Latinos may be of any race.
Race / Ethnicity (NH = Non-Hispanic)	Pop 1980	Pop 1990	Pop 2000	Pop 2010	Pop 2020	% 1980	% 1990	% 2000	% 2010	% 2020
White alone (NH)	21,572	28,172	38,180	37,914	37,341	87.92%	88.70%	88.86%	86.31%	81.08%
Black or African American alone (NH)	2,404	2,758	2,925	3,075	3,911	9.80%	8.68%	6.81%	7.00%	8.49%
Native American or Alaska Native alone (NH)	71	123	248	193	244	0.29%	0.39%	0.58%	0.44%	0.53%
Asian alone (NH)	49	156	374	416	424	0.20%	0.49%	0.87%	0.95%	0.92%
Native Hawaiian or Pacific Islander alone (NH)	x	x	15	20	9	x	x	0.03%	0.05%	0.02%
Other race alone (NH)	12	2	20	58	166	0.05%	0.01%	0.05%	0.13%	0.36%
Mixed race or Multiracial (NH)	x	x	430	807	2,040	x	x	1.00%	1.84%	4.43%
Hispanic or Latino (any race)	429	549	775	1,446	1,918	1.75%	1.73%	1.80%	3.29%	4.16%
Total	24,537	31,760	42,967	43,929	46,053	100.00%	100.00%	100.00%	100.00%	100.00%

=== 2020 census ===
As of the 2020 census, the county had a population of 46,053. The median age was 44.5 years. 21.4% of residents were under the age of 18 and 20.8% of residents were 65 years of age or older. For every 100 females there were 96.8 males, and for every 100 females age 18 and over there were 93.5 males age 18 and over.

The racial makeup of the county was 82.2% White, 8.6% Black or African American, 0.6% American Indian and Alaska Native, 0.9% Asian, <0.1% Native Hawaiian and Other Pacific Islander, 1.3% from some other race, and 6.4% from two or more races. Hispanic or Latino residents of any race comprised 4.2% of the population.

61.7% of residents lived in urban areas, while 38.3% lived in rural areas.

There were 19,034 households in the county, of which 28.0% had children under the age of 18 living in them. Of all households, 45.2% were married-couple households, 19.3% were households with a male householder and no spouse or partner present, and 28.1% were households with a female householder and no spouse or partner present. About 29.4% of all households were made up of individuals and 13.9% had someone living alone who was 65 years of age or older.

There were 22,340 housing units, of which 14.8% were vacant. Among occupied housing units, 73.8% were owner-occupied and 26.2% were renter-occupied. The homeowner vacancy rate was 2.0% and the rental vacancy rate was 10.8%.

=== Religion ===
Hancock is the only county in Mississippi where Roman Catholics outnumber Baptists. Catholics comprise a plurality of residents of Hancock County, owing to the county's French colonial heritage and proximity to deeply Catholic Southern Louisiana.

== Communities ==
=== Cities ===
- Bay St. Louis (county seat)
- Diamondhead
- Waveland

=== Census-designated places ===
- Kiln
- Pearlington

=== Unincorporated communities ===
- Ansley
- Clermont Harbor
- Lakeshore
- Leetown
- Napoleon
- Necaise
- Shoreline Park (former CDP)

=== Ghost towns ===
- Gainesville
- Logtown

== Politics ==
Hancock County, like most of the rest of the Gulf Coast, votes heavily Republican. The last Democrat to carry the county was Jimmy Carter in 1976 through a narrow 90-vote plurality, and Al Gore in 2000 was the last Democrat to manage even 30% of the county's vote.

United States presidential election results for Hancock County, Mississippi
Year	Republican		Democratic		Third party(ies)	
Year	No.	%	No.	%	No.	%
1912	28	6.19%	365	80.75%	59	13.05%
1916	68	11.68%	512	87.97%	2	0.34%
1920	130	29.68%	305	69.63%	3	0.68%
1924	192	27.08%	467	65.87%	50	7.05%
1928	456	26.21%	1,284	73.79%	0	0.00%
1932	109	7.40%	1,349	91.64%	14	0.95%
1936	164	11.20%	1,284	87.70%	16	1.09%
1940	197	11.27%	1,550	88.67%	1	0.06%
1944	137	7.70%	1,642	92.30%	0	0.00%
1948	151	8.51%	222	12.51%	1,402	78.99%
1952	1,347	46.05%	1,578	53.95%	0	0.00%
1956	1,421	53.14%	1,179	44.09%	74	2.77%
1960	719	21.44%	2,132	63.58%	502	14.97%
1964	2,550	62.95%	1,501	37.05%	0	0.00%
1968	1,065	17.63%	904	14.96%	4,072	67.41%
1972	5,133	86.28%	745	12.52%	71	1.19%
1976	3,765	48.01%	3,855	49.16%	222	2.83%
1980	5,088	57.07%	3,544	39.75%	283	3.17%
1984	7,662	74.07%	2,630	25.43%	52	0.50%
1988	7,763	66.42%	3,760	32.17%	164	1.40%
1992	6,422	47.78%	4,651	34.61%	2,367	17.61%
1996	5,820	51.16%	4,303	37.82%	1,254	11.02%
2000	9,326	64.11%	4,801	33.00%	421	2.89%
2004	12,581	70.41%	5,107	28.58%	181	1.01%
2008	13,020	76.34%	3,768	22.09%	268	1.57%
2012	12,964	75.52%	3,917	22.82%	286	1.67%
2016	13,811	78.31%	3,344	18.96%	482	2.73%
2020	16,132	76.98%	4,504	21.49%	321	1.53%
2024	16,684	78.79%	4,262	20.13%	229	1.08%

== Education ==
School districts include:

- Bay St. Louis School District
- Hancock County School District
- Picayune School District

== See also ==
- National Register of Historic Places listings in Hancock County, Mississippi
