= Mississippi Highway 67 =

Highway in Mississippi

Mississippi Highway 67

Route information
- Maintained by MDOT
- Length: 20.252 mi (32.592 km)
- Existed: 1960–present

Major junctions
- South end: I-10 / I-110 in D'Iberville
- North end: US 49 in Saucier

Location
- Country: United States
- State: Mississippi
- Counties: Harrison

Highway system
- Mississippi State Highway System; Interstate; US; State
← MS 63	→ I-69

Mississippi Highway 67 (MS 67) is a state highway in Mississippi. It is an expressway and generally runs northwest for 20 miles (32 km) from the Interstate 10, Interstate 110, and Mississippi Highway 15 cloverleaf interchange in D'Iberville, to a trumpet interchange with U.S. Highway 49 north of Saucier. MS 67 is located entirely within Harrison County.

== Route description ==
MS 67 begins at the interchange between MS 15 and I-10 (Exit 46 A/B) in the city of D'Iberville, with the road continuing south across Biloxi Bay into Biloxi as I-110 (Exit 4 A/B). MS 15 and MS 67 head north, concurrent (overlapped) with each other, to have an interchange with both Sangani Boulevard and Promenade Parkway before crossing the Tchoutacabouffa River to leave D'Iberville and have an intersection with Lickskillet Road, which connects to Old Highway 67. MS 15 now splits off at a large trumpet interchange and MS 67 heads northwest through a mix of woodlands and subdivisions for the next several miles, where it rejoins the original MS 67 alignment, passes through the new planned community of Tradition, has an interchange with MS 605, and an intersection with Tradition Parkway. It is here where the highway passes by the Tradition Campus of William Carey University, as well as the Bryant Center of Mississippi Gulf Coast Community College. Old Highway 67 splits off again (this time known as Success Road) to head north into the community of Success, while new MS 67 continues northwest through rural woodlands to cross Saucier Creek, as well as have an intersection with Bethel Road (Old Highway 67), before entering the community of Saucier and coming to an end at an interchange with US 49 at the northern end of town.

The entire length of Mississippi Highway 67 is a major, four-lane divided Expressway.

== History ==
=== MS 55 ===
Mississippi Highway 55
- Location: D'Iberville - Saucier
- Existed: 1932–1960

What is now MS 67 was originally designated as Mississippi Highway 55 (MS 55) in 1932. This designation survived all the way to 1960, when it was decommissioned and renumbered to MS 67, to avoid confusion with the then new I-55.

=== Four-lane realignment ===
The current 4-lane expressway represents the third realignment of Highway 67 during its history. Highway 67 previously existed as a 2-lane road, starting at I-10 Exit 41 south of Woolmarket, and proceeding north past the village of Success, before turning west to end at Highway 49 about a mile south of its present terminus.

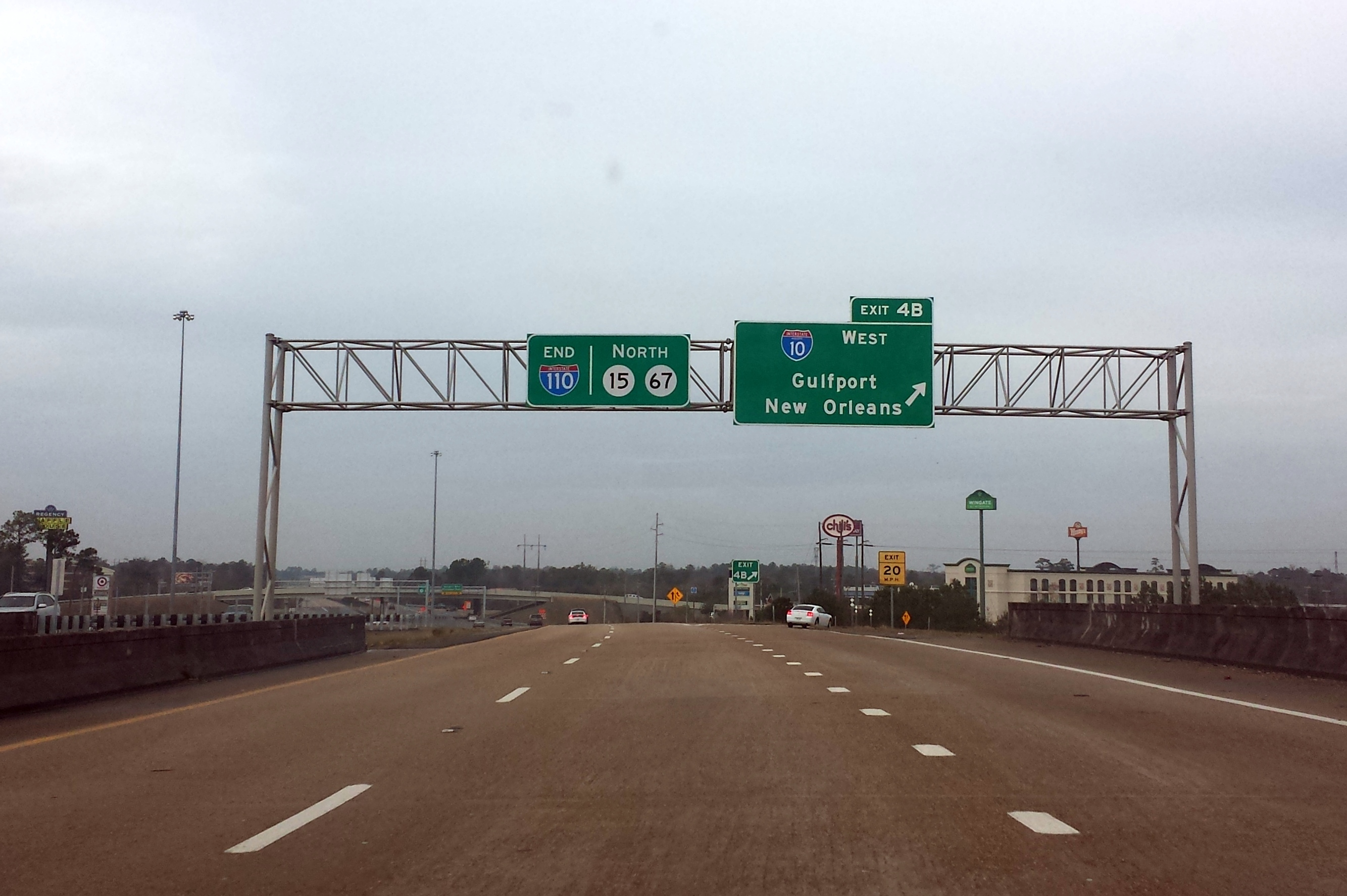
I-110 at its northern terminus, with the roadway continuing as Highway 15 and Highway 67 in D'Iberville

Prior to the opening of Interstate 10 in the 1970s, Highway 67 continued southeast from Woolmarket to intersect Highway 15 in D'Iberville, and the two routes crossed the now demolished bridge across the Biloxi Back Bay, and then following Caillavet Street to Highway 90, where both routes ended.

The old Highway 67 was bypassed with a new 4-lane highway that now carries the Highway 67 designation from US-49 in Saucier to a new southern terminus at Highway 90 near downtown Biloxi. Highway 15 joins Highway 67 north of Interstate 10 in D'Iberville, and both routes proceed south on the same alignment to their southern termini at the I-10/I-110 interchange. The highway continues south into Biloxi as I-110.

Construction on the Highway 67 relocation project began in 2002 and the road officially opened to traffic on January 16, 2009. The entire project cost approximately $72 million.

== Major intersections ==
The entire route is in Harrison County.

Location	mi	km	Destinations	Notes
D'Iberville	0.00	0.00	I-10 / I-110 south – Pascagoula, Mobile, Gulfport, New Orleans, Biloxi	I-10 exits 46 A/B; southern terminus of MS 15 and MS 67; south end of MS 15 overlap; signed as exits 4A (east) and 4B (west)
D'Iberville	0.37	0.60	Sangani Boulevard / Promenade Parkway	Interchange
	2.50	4.02	MS 15 north	Interchange; north end of MS 15 overlap
	11.02	17.73	MS 605 (Tradition Parkway) – Gulfport	Interchange
	13.06	21.02	MS 605 (Tradition Parkway)	
	20.83	33.52	US 49 – Gulfport, Hattiesburg, Jackson	Northern terminus; interchange
1.000 mi = 1.609 km; 1.000 km = 0.621 mi: Concurrency terminus
