= List of exits on Interstate 10 =

The Interstate 10 exit list has been divided by state:

- Interstate 10 in California#Exit list
- Interstate 10 in Arizona#Exit list
- Interstate 10 in New Mexico#Exit list
- Interstate 10 in Texas#Exit list
- Interstate 10 in Louisiana#Exit list
- Interstate 10 in Mississippi#Exit list
- Interstate 10 in Alabama#Exit list
- Interstate 10 in Florida#Exit list
