= Lizana, Mississippi =

- Unincorporated community
- Location within Mississippi Location within the United States
- Coordinates: 30°32′16″N 89°15′08″W
- Country: United States
- State: Mississippi
- County: Harrison
- Elevation: 164 ft (50 m)
- Time zone: UTC-6 (Central (CST))
  - Summer (DST): UTC-5 (CDT)
- ZIP Code(s): 39503, 39574
- Area code: 228
- GNIS feature ID

Lizana is an unincorporated community located in Harrison County, Mississippi. Lizana is approximately 9.8 miles (15.8 km) southwest of Saucier along Mississippi Highway 53.

Lizana is part of the Gulfport-Biloxi metropolitan area.

== History ==
According to Harrison County tax records, Lizana was settled by Henry Sabastian Lizana, from nearby DeLisle in the 1880s. The lumber boom in the area contributed to Lizana's success as an entrepreneur.

Henry established a general store and post office near the logging railroad that once ran through the area. In the early 1920s, the logging industry declined. He deeded a small amount of his parcel of land to his nine children, and what remained was relinquished to the state due to unpaid taxes.

In 1901, Father Rene Sorin, also from DeLisle, oversaw the building of the first Catholic mission in the area, St. Ann Catholic Church, on land donated by Henry. The mission fell into disrepair, and in 1937 was relocated to its present location on Mississippi Highway 53.

From 1902 to 1906, the Gulf Coast Lumber Company operated the rail lines built in the area. The lines were built to transport the valuable long leaf pine trees being logged in the Lizana area to a sawmill Gulf Coast Lumber operated in nearby Lyman. In 1906 the Gulf Coast Lumber Company was purchased by Ingram-Day Lumber Company which would later be sold to Batson & Hatten Lumber Company on May 10, 1924. Batson & Hatten discontinued operation of the Lyman mill in 1932.

Lizana post office was established August 7, 1908, with Henry L. Lizana as first postmaster, but was discontinued December 31, 1920, with mail to Saucier.

== Recreation ==
One visiting South Mississippi must not miss out on Lizana's Annual Catfish Festival, organized by St. Ann Catholic Church. The festival has a mid 20th century county fair atmosphere with its funnel cakes, rides and softball tournaments. The festival is usually held the last week in May (Memorial Day weekend).

== Carnival ==
For the past few years, Lizana has hosted its annual Mardi Gras Parade organized by the Lizana Carnival Association. Despite being held in a rural area of Harrison County, the parade is considered to be one of the fastest growing parades as well as the most family-friendly.

== Education ==
Lizana is served by the Harrison County School District.

== Other ==
Lizana was featured at the beginning of JAG episode, "The Witches of Gulfport" (first aired April 25, 2000), as the site of a Wiccan ceremony.
