= Interstate 310 (Mississippi) =

Canceled highway in Mississippi

Future Interstate 310
- I-310 corridor highlighted in red

Route information
- Auxiliary route of I-10
- Maintained by MDOT
- Length: 6 mi (9.7 km)

Major junctions
- South end: US 90 near the Port of Gulfport
- North end: I-10 in Gulfport

Location
- Country: United States
- State: Mississippi
- Counties: Harrison

Highway system
- Interstate Highway System; Main; Auxiliary; Suffixed; Business; Future; Mississippi State Highway System; Interstate; US; State
| ← MS 309 | → MS 310 |
| ← MS 600 | MS 601 | → MS 602 |

Interstate 310 (I-310), also designated as Mississippi Highway 601 (MS 601), was a proposed auxiliary route of I-10 in Gulfport, Mississippi, which had been planned to connect US Highway 90 (US 90) near the Port of Gulfport to I-10.

In 2021, the route for I-310 was identified within High Priority Corridors 93(B) and 100(B) as part of the development of proposed I-14. High Priority Corridor 94 connects with this route's proposed northern terminus along I-10 and continues northward, connecting to I-59 in Hattiesburg, Mississippi and running parallel to US Highway 49 for its entire length.

== Route description ==
The original corridor for I-310 began at a new intersection near US Highway 90 in Gulfport that would have facilitated shipping traffic from the Port of Gulfport. I-310 north of this intersection would have been elevated over the city, and a partial exit was to be constructed at 28th Street allowing for exiting southbound and entering northbound traffic. I-310 would have then continued north-west across wetlands and forests before terminating at Exit 31 (Canal Road) of I-10.

== History ==
Highway planning began in 1994 with a meeting between the Mississippi Department of Transportation (MDOT) and leaders for Harrison County, Mississippi, Gulfport, and the Port of Gulfport. All parties agreed to the development of a new auxiliary road connecting the port and I-10, and the Mississippi State Legislature approved of the project in 1996. Right-of-way acquisitions began in 2006. Preliminary land-clearing began on the section between I-10 and 28th Street in 2009 after the U.S. Army Corps of Engineers issued a conservation easement. This permit would be invalidated in 2011, bringing construction of the new I-310 to a stop.

In 1999, MDOT proposed an elevated freeway for the portions of I-310 in downtown Gulfport. This plan was rejected by city officials and business leaders, and MDOT shelved plans for the I-310 corridor south of 28th Street indefinitely in 2007.

The Infrastructure Investment and Jobs Act of 2021 designated an extended future I-14 corridor that would encompass the original "14th Amendment Highway" and "Gulf Coast Strategic Highway" concepts. Future I-310/MS 601 became part of High Priority Corridor 93(b), the South Mississippi Corridor, and High Priority Corridor 100(B), the Central Mississippi Corridor.

== Exit list ==
The entire route is in Gulfport, Harrison County.

| mi | km | Exit | Destinations | Notes |
|---|---|---|---|---|
| 0.00 | 0.00 | 0 | US 90 | Southern terminus |
| | | | 28th Street | Southbound exit and northbound entrance |
| 6.00 | 9.66 | 6 | I-10 | Northern terminus of I-310 |
1.000 mi = 1.609 km; 1.000 km = 0.621 mi: Incomplete access
