= Joe James (racing driver) =

American racing driver

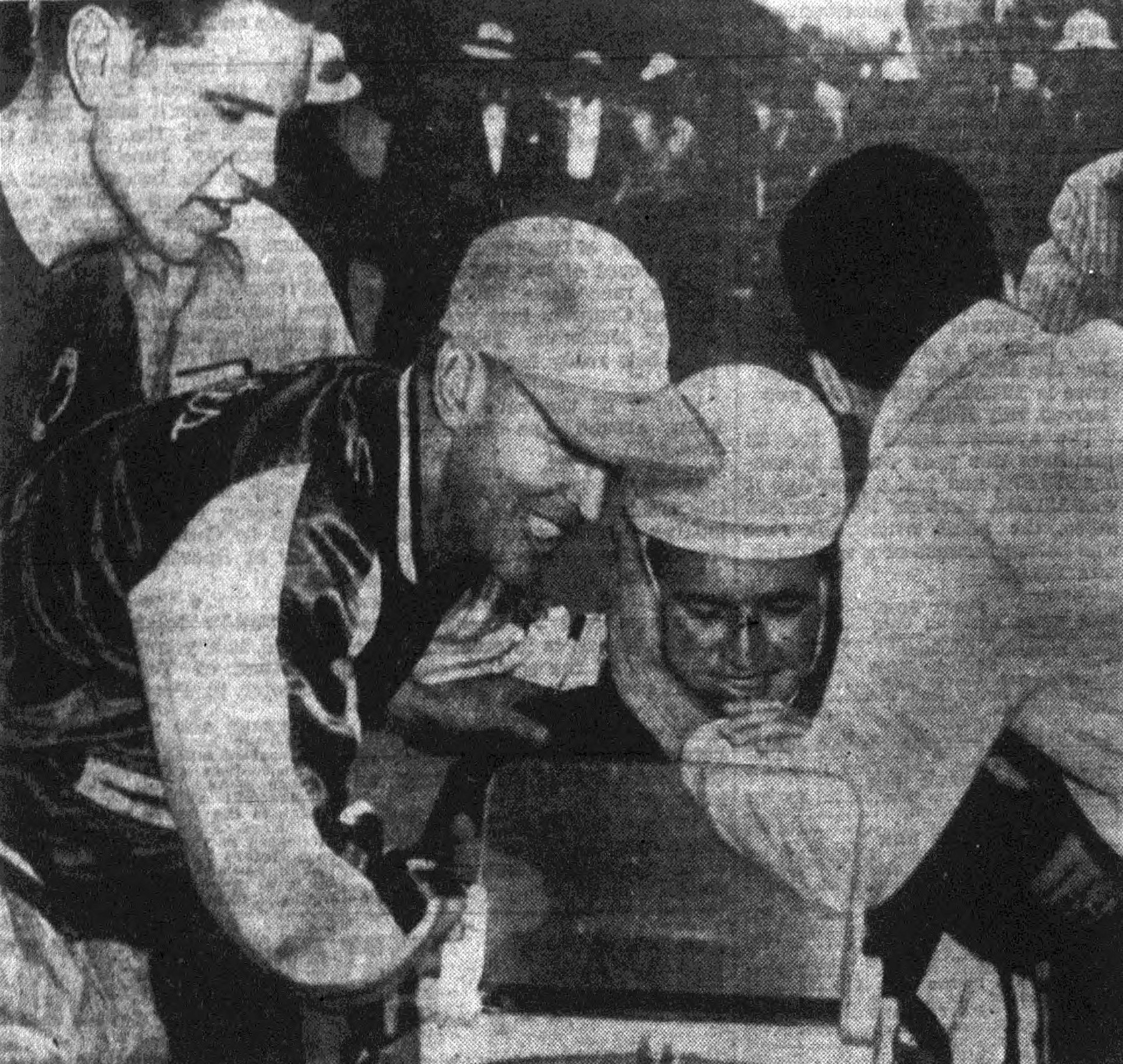
- James (in vehicle) gets congratulated by his pit crew after being the last driver to qualify for the 1951 Indianapolis 500.
- Born: May 23, 1925; Saucier, Mississippi, U.S.
- Died: November 5, 1952 (aged 27); San Jose, California, U.S.

Formula One World Championship career
- Nationality: (United States) American
- Active years: 1950–1952
- Team(s): Kurtis Kraft, Watson, Weidel
- Entries: 3 (2 starts)
- Championships: 0
- Wins: 0
- Podiums: 0
- Career points: 0
- Pole positions: 0
- Fastest laps: 0
- First entry: 1950 Indianapolis 500
- Last entry: 1952 Indianapolis 500

Joseph David James (May 23, 1925 – November 5, 1952) was an American racecar driver. He was born in Saucier, Mississippi and died during a Champ Car race at San Jose Speedway.

== Award ==
James was inducted in the National Sprint Car Hall of Fame in 1997.

== Legacy ==
Salem Speedway honored James along with Pat O'Connor with an annual title event. The 2020 event was part of the USAC Silvercrown series.

== Indy 500 results ==
Year	Car	Start	Qual	Rank	Finish	Laps	Led	Retired
1950	63/82	-	-	-	-	-	-	Did not qualify
1951	26	30	134.098	10	33	8	0	Drive shaft
1952	14	16	134.953	22	13	200	0	Running
Totals						208	0	

Starts	2
Poles	0
Front Row	0
Wins	0
Top 5	0
Top 10	0
Retired	1

== World Championship career summary ==
The Indianapolis 500 was part of the FIA World Championship schedule from 1950 through 1960. Drivers competing at Indy during those years were credited with World Championship points and participation. James participated in two World Championship races but scored no World Championship points.
