= Interstate 10 =

Interstate Highway across the southern US

Interstate 10
- I-10 highlighted in red

Route information
- Length: 2,460.34 mi (3,959.53 km)
- Existed: August 14, 1957–present
- NHS: Entire route

Major junctions
- West end: SR 1 in Santa Monica, CA
- I-5 in Los Angeles, CA; I-15 in Ontario, CA; I-17 in Phoenix, AZ; I-25 in Las Cruces, NM; I-20 in Reeves County, TX; I-35 through San Antonio, TX; I-45 in Houston, TX; I-55 in LaPlace, LA; I-65 in Mobile, AL; I-75 near Lake City, FL
- East end: I-95 / US 17 in Jacksonville, FL

Location
- Country: United States
- States: California, Arizona, New Mexico, Texas, Louisiana, Mississippi, Alabama, Florida

Highway system
- Interstate Highway System; Main; Auxiliary; Suffixed; Business; Future

Interstate 10 (I-10) is the southernmost transcontinental highway in the Interstate Highway System of the United States. It is the fourth-longest Interstate in the country at 2,460.34 miles (3,959.53 km), following I-90, I-80, and I-40. It was part of the originally planned Interstate Highway network that was laid out in 1956, and its last section was completed in 1990.

I-10 stretches from the Pacific Ocean at State Route 1 (SR 1, Pacific Coast Highway) in Santa Monica, California, to I-95 in Jacksonville, Florida. Other major cities connected by I-10 include (from west to east) Los Angeles, Phoenix, Tucson, Las Cruces, El Paso, San Antonio, Houston, Baton Rouge, New Orleans, Gulfport, Mobile, Pensacola, and Tallahassee. Over one-third of its total length is within the state of Texas alone.

== Route description ==
Lengths
	mi	km
CA	242.54	390.33
AZ	392.33	631.39
NM	164.27	264.37
TX	881.00	1,417.83
LA	274.42	441.64
MS	77.19	124.23
AL	66.31	106.72
FL	362.28	583.03
Total	2,460.34	3,959.53

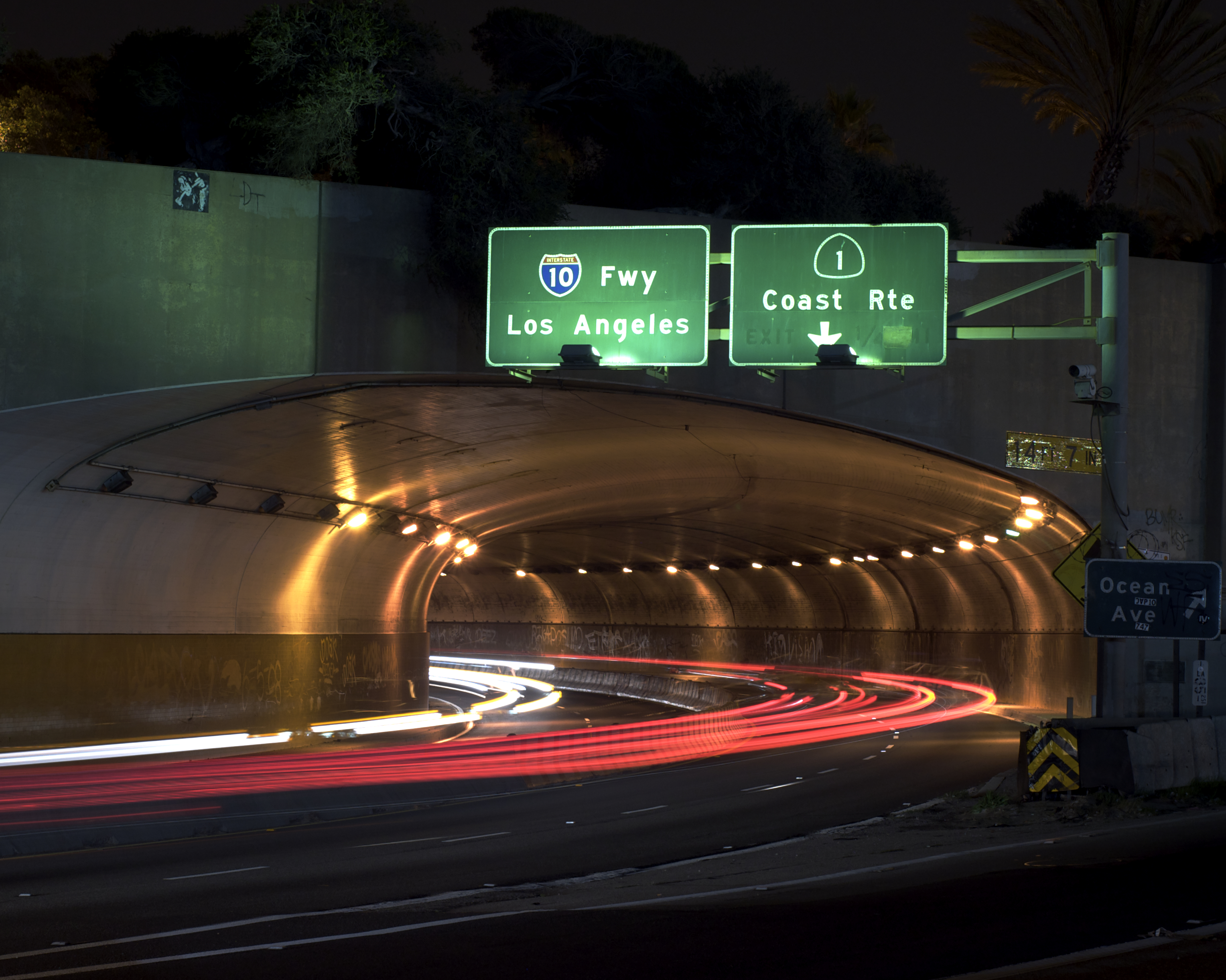
Western end of I-10 at the McClure Tunnel in Santa Monica, California

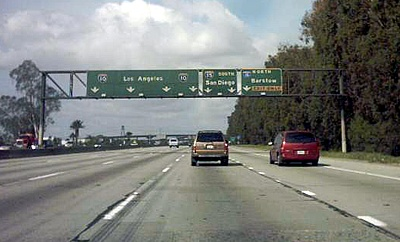
The San Bernardino Freeway in California near the interchange with the Ontario Freeway (I-15)

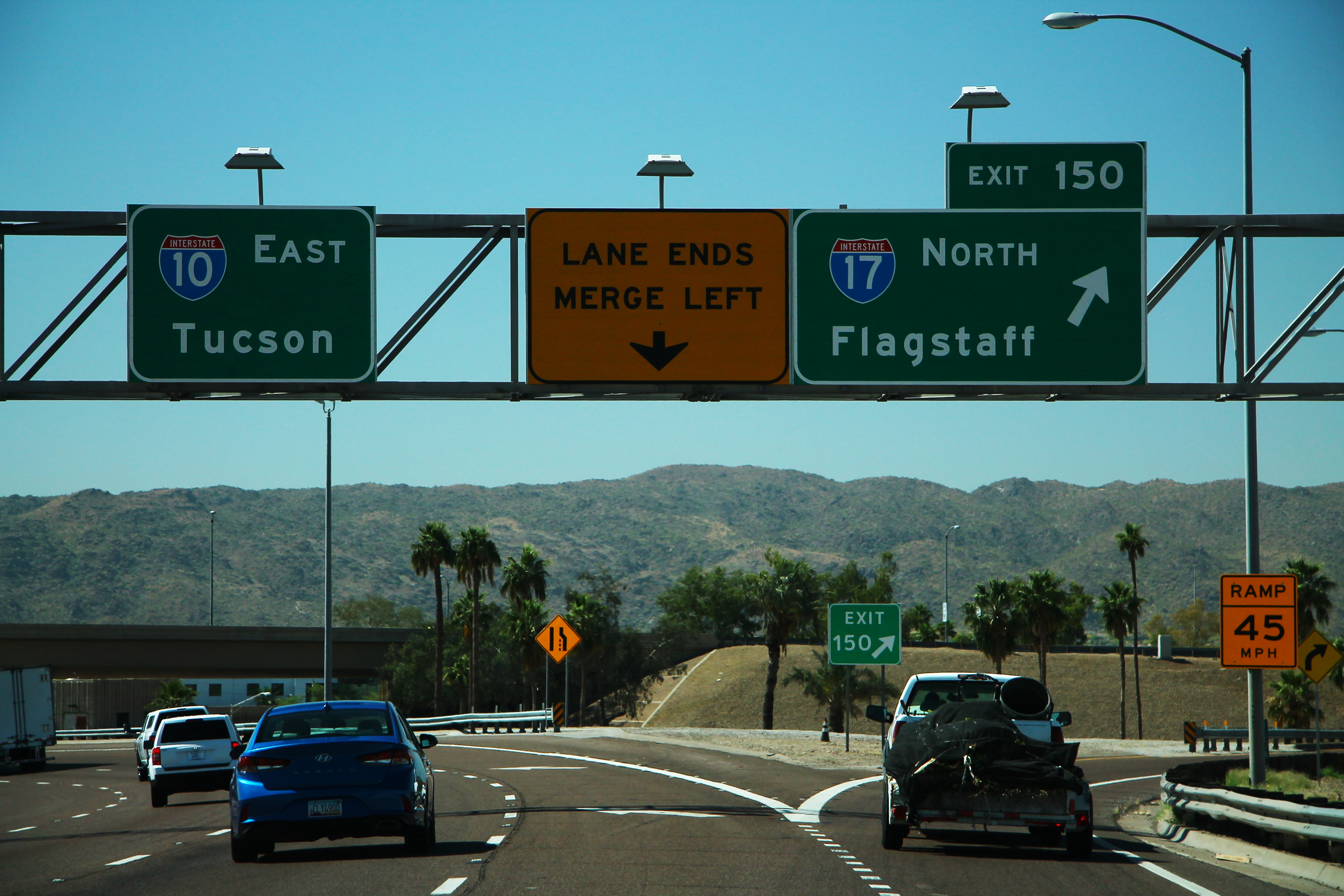
The end of I-17 at I-10 in Phoenix, Arizona

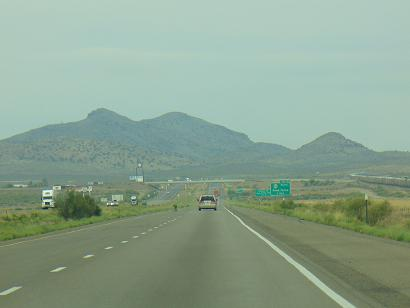
View of Lordsburg from US 70 and the junction with I-10 in New Mexico

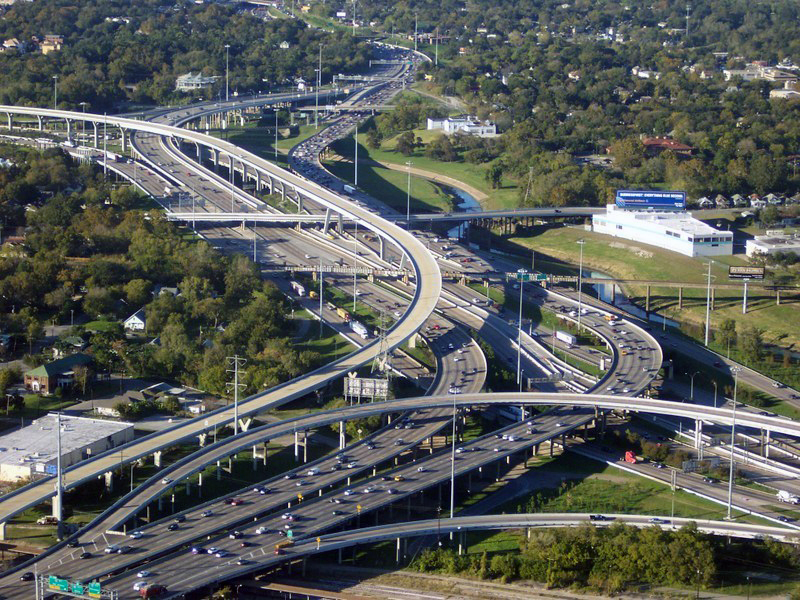
I-45 and I-10 next to Downtown Houston, Texas

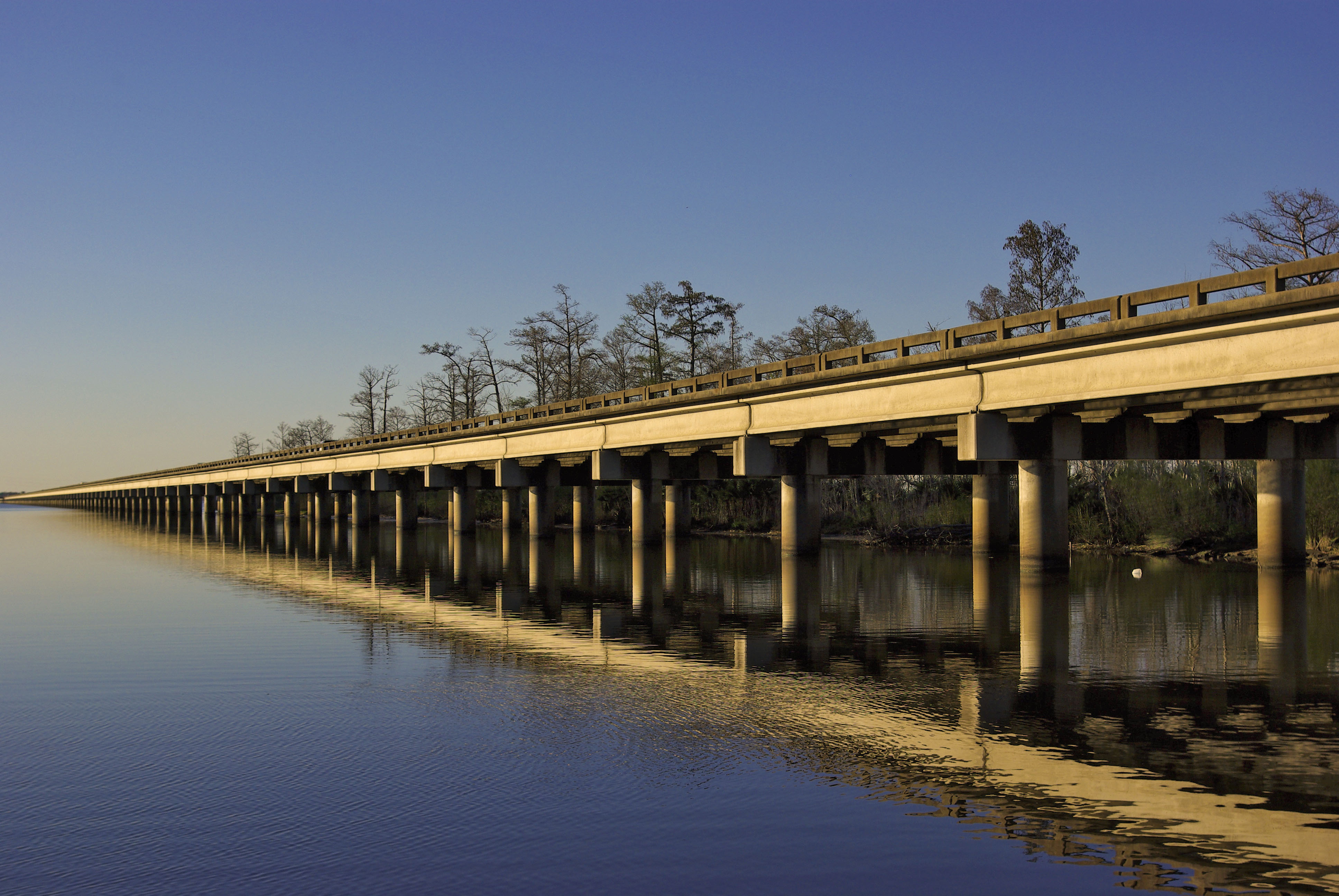
I-10 running west of New Orleans, Louisiana, spans the Bonnet Carré Spillway at Lake Pontchartrain as the I-10 Bonnet Carré Spillway Bridge

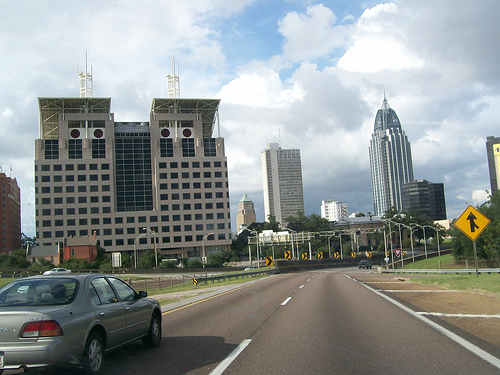
I-10 eastbound in downtown Mobile, Alabama, approaching the George Wallace Tunnel

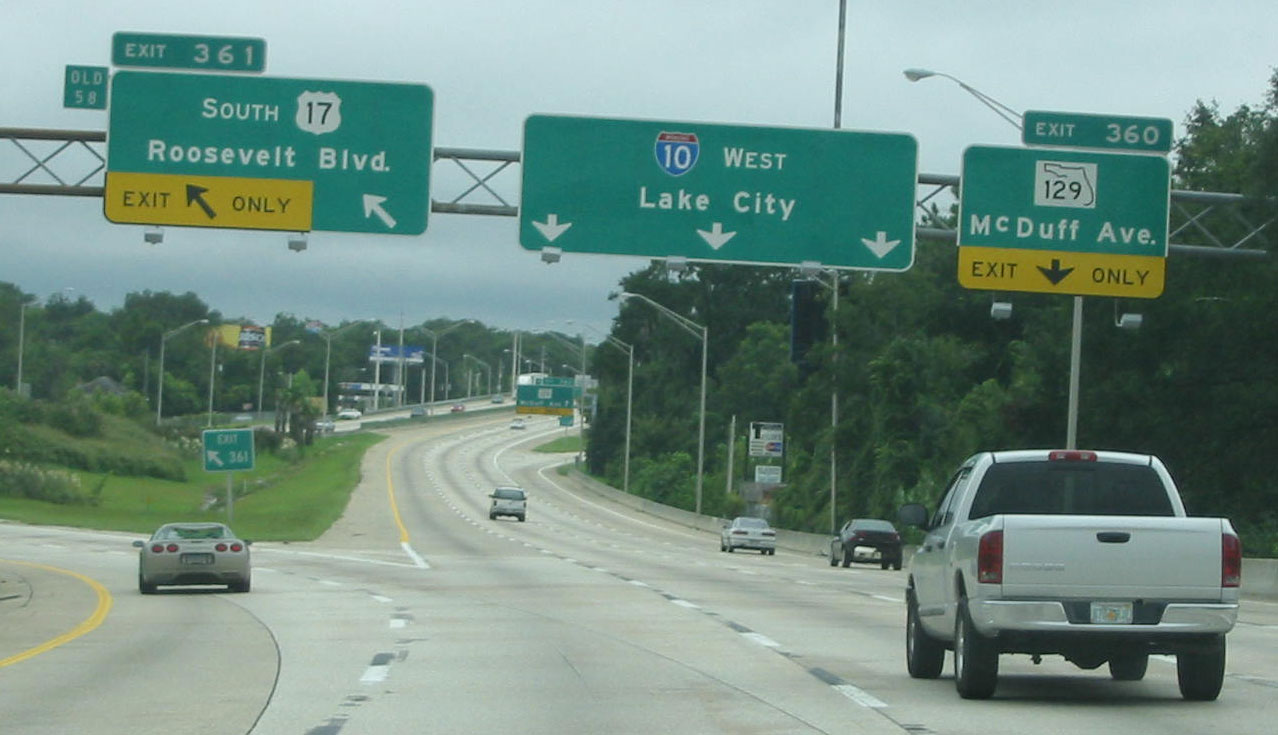
I-10 west at the interchange for US 17 Alt. south in Jacksonville, Florida

=== California ===
Between its west terminus in Santa Monica, California, and the major East Los Angeles Interchange, I-10 is known as the Santa Monica Freeway. The Santa Monica Freeway is also called the Rosa Parks Freeway, named after the civil rights activist, for the segment beginning at I-405 (San Diego Freeway), and ending at I-110/SR 110 (Harbor Freeway). The segment between the East Los Angeles Interchange, in East Los Angeles, and the city of San Bernardino, 63 miles (101 km) long, is called the San Bernardino Freeway.

Other names exist for I-10. For example, from 1976 to 2022, a sign near the western terminus of the highway in Santa Monica proclaimed the highway to be the Christopher Columbus Transcontinental Highway. The state legislature authorized its removal in 2022 after years of lobbying by Native Americans.

I-10 is known to a considerably lesser degree as the Veterans Memorial Highway, and it is listed as a Blue Star Memorial Highway. In Palm Springs, I-10 is also named the Sonny Bono Memorial Freeway, named after the singer, actor, and politician, as a tribute to the late entertainer who served both as the mayor of Palm Springs, and as a U.S. representative. Another stretch a short distance east in Indio is proclaimed the Doctor June McCarroll Memorial Freeway, named after the doctor known for popularizing road lane striping.

=== Arizona ===
In Arizona, the highway is designated the Pearl Harbor Memorial Highway. The portion through Phoenix is named the Papago Freeway, and it is a vital piece of the metropolitan Phoenix freeway system. This designation starts at State Route 101 (SR 101; Loop 101), near 99th Avenue, and continues eastward to the interchange southeast of downtown, which is the terminus of I-17.

Near Buckeye, the freeway has milemarkers posted every 0.2 miles (0.32 km) from 112.2 to 110.8 with the Interstate shield and direction of travel posted on the westbound lanes. On the eastbound lanes, milemarkers from 110.8 to 112.2 do not include the I‑10 shield and direction of travel.

From the southern terminus of I-17 to the southernmost junction with SR 202 (Loop 202), the highway is signed as the Maricopa Freeway. This name holds true as well for I-17 from its southern terminus to the Durango Curve south of Buckeye Road. From Loop 202 south to the eastern terminus of I-8 just southeast of Casa Grande, the highway is declared the Pearl Harbor Memorial Highway. The Arizona Department of Transportation also has maps that show it as the Maricopa Freeway, while the American Automobile Association and other sources show it as the Pima Freeway. The latter's name is used on a stretch of Loop 101 from Loop 202 to I-17.

Between I-17 in Phoenix and the I-19 interchanges in Tucson, I-10 is included in the federally designated CANAMEX Corridor, extending from Mexico City, Mexico, to Edmonton, Alberta.

In Tucson, between I-10 mileposts 259 and 260 are interchange ramps connecting I-10 with the northern terminus of I-19.

The highest elevation along I-10 occurs just east of Tucson, 20 miles (32 km) west of Willcox, at the milemarker 320 exit for the rest stop. The westbound lanes of I-10 briefly cross above 5,000 feet (1,500 m) above sea level.

=== New Mexico ===
In New Mexico, I-10 more or less follows the former path of US Route 80 (US 80) across the state, although major portions of old US 80 were bypassed in the western New Mexico Bootheel and in Doña Ana County. I-10 passes through three southern New Mexico municipalities of regional significance before the junction with I-25: Lordsburg, Deming, and Las Cruces. Most of I-10 in New Mexico, between exit 24 and exit 135, is concurrent with US 70.

At Lordsburg is the western junction of US 70 and a concurrency; the two highways are joined all the way to Las Cruces. Several exits between Lordsburg and Deming are either for former towns (including Separ, Quincy, and Gage) or lack any town at all.

At Deming is the western junction of US 180, which also forms a concurrency with I-10 all the way to El Paso. One mile (1.6 km) north of Deming on US 180 is State Road 26 (NM 26) which serves as a short cut to north I-25 and Albuquerque.

I-10/US 70/US 180 continue east to Las Cruces which is the southern end of I-25. US 70 leaves I-10 (prior to the junction with I-25), heading northeast to Alamogordo and passing through the north side of Las Cruces. The junction with I-25 occurs just south of the New Mexico State University campus, on the southern end of Las Cruces. I-10/US 180 becomes concurrent with US 85 at the junction with I-25. I-10/US 85/US 180 then turns south to the Texas state line, crossing it at Anthony.

=== Texas ===
From the state line with New Mexico (at Anthony) to State Highway 20 (SH 20) in west El Paso, I-10 is bordered by frontage roads South Desert for lanes along I-10 east (actually headed south) and North Desert for lanes along I-10 west (headed north). The Interstate then has no frontage roads for nine miles (14 km) but regains them east of downtown and retains them to Clint. In this stretch, the frontage roads are Gateway East for the eastbound lanes and Gateway West for the westbound lanes. All frontage roads are one-way streets. Gateway East and Gateway West are notable, in particular, for the Texas Department of Transportation (TxDOT)'s liberal usage of the Texas U-turn at most underpasses of I-10 on this stretch.

I-10 is the western terminus for I-20, and the two highways intersect in Reeves County, about 41 miles (66 km) southwest of Pecos, at milemarker 186.

Based on state DOT lengths, I-10's midpoint is near Junction, Kimble County, TX, 1.1 miles west of FM 2291.

A small portion of I-10 from Loop 1604 to Downtown San Antonio is known as the Northwest Expressway or the McDermott Freeway, while another portion from downtown to Loop 1604 east is called East Expressway or José López Freeway. In Downtown San Antonio, it has a concurrency with I-35, and, throughout most of the northwest side of the city, it has a concurrency with US 87, which begins in Comfort, before turning off and heading east out of the city. Starting in San Antonio, it generally follows a direct route of former US 90, with occasional small concurrences.

In Houston, from the western suburb of Katy to downtown, I-10 is commonly known as the Katy Freeway. This section has as many as 18 lanes (12 main lanes and 6 mid-freeway high-occupancy toll [HOT]/high-occupancy vehicle [HOV] lanes, not counting access road turning lanes) and is one of the widest freeways in the world. The space for the expansion was the right-of-way of the old Missouri–Kansas–Texas Railroad. The section east of Downtown Houston is officially known as the East Freeway, although it is widely known by locals as the Baytown East Freeway due to a marketing push by Baytown, one of the largest cities in Greater Houston.

In Beaumont, it is known as I-10 south, south of Calder Avenue, and I-10 north, north of Calder Avenue. It is known as I-10 east from the I-10 curve to the Neches River, which is Beaumont's and Jefferson County's eastern boundary line. Continuing into Orange County and passing through the city of Orange at the easternmost end of Texas, and located at the base of the Sabine River bridge is the last I-10 milemarker in Texas, number 880, before entering into Louisiana. Approximately 36 percent of I-10's entire route is located within Texas; the longest segment of any signed Interstate within one state.

=== Louisiana ===
In Lake Charles, a 13-mile (21 km) loop route signed as I-210 branches off of I-10 and goes through the southern portion of the city. In Lafayette, it serves as the southern terminus for I-49. Shortly afterward, there is an 18-mile (29 km) stretch of elevated highway between Lafayette and Baton Rouge known as the Atchafalaya Swamp Freeway, as it goes over the Atchafalaya River, across the Atchafalaya Basin Bridge, and the adjacent swamps. It crosses the Mississippi River at the Horace Wilkinson Bridge in Baton Rouge, where the eastbound lanes are the only portion of I-10 that is essentially one lane.

After crossing the Horace Wilkinson Bridge, two lanes from I-110 south merge with two lanes I-10 east into three lanes with one of the eastbound lanes quickly becoming an exit only lane. After this, the highway is back to four lanes approaching the I-10/I-12 split. I-12 links Baton Rouge to Slidell and bypasses I-10's southward jog through New Orleans by remaining north of Lake Pontchartrain. On this route, I-10 serves as the southern terminus for I-55 in LaPlace and crosses over a portion of Lake Pontchartrain on the I-10 Bonnet Carré Spillway Bridge.

In New Orleans, a stretch of I-10 from the I-10/I-610 Junction near the Orleans–Jefferson parish line to the US 90/US 90 Business (US 90 Bus.) junction is known as the Pontchartrain Expressway. An underpass near the I-10/I-610 junction to travel under a railroad track is one of the lowest points in New Orleans and is highly susceptible to flooding as buildups of rainwater are commonplace during hurricanes or heavy rainstorms. Near Slidell, I-10 serves as the eastern terminus of I-12 and the southern terminus of I-59; turning east to the Mississippi state line. The highway is known as the Stephen Ambrose Memorial Highway, named after the historian and writer, until the state line.

I-310 and I-510 are the built sections of what was slated to be I-410, which would have acted as a southern bypass of New Orleans. They function as spur routes serving lower density or suburban areas west and east of New Orleans respectively. I-610 is a shortcut from the eastern to western portion of New Orleans avoiding I-10's detour into the New Orleans Central Business District.

=== Mississippi ===
I-10 in Mississippi runs from the Louisiana state line to the Alabama state line through Hancock, Harrison, and Jackson counties on the Gulf Coast. It passes through the northern sections of Gulfport and Biloxi while passing just north of Pascagoula and Bay St. Louis. It also passes right south of the NASA Stennis Space Center. The highway roughly parallels US 90.

The law defining the route of I-10 is Mississippi Code § 65-3-3.

=== Alabama ===
I-10 crosses over the border from Jackson County, Mississippi, and it goes through Mobile County in southwestern Alabama. In Mobile, I-10 is the southern terminus of I-65. In downtown Mobile, I-10 goes through one of the few highway tunnels in Alabama, the George Wallace Tunnel under the Mobile River.

The speed limit of the eastbound approach is posted at 40 mph (64 km/h) because of the sharp downward curve approaching the tunnel. The highway then crosses approximately eight miles (13 km) of the upper part of Mobile Bay on the Jubilee Parkway, a bridge that local people call the "Bayway". The highway is next to Battleship Parkway. On the other side of Mobile Bay, the highway goes through the suburban area of Baldwin County before passing through Malbis, Loxley, and then on to the Perdido River to cross over into Florida.

=== Florida ===
I-10 travels north of the cities of Pensacola and Tallahassee, serving the suburban areas within each respective city. In the former, a six-mile (9.7 km) spur route serves the downtown area, signed as I-110. Most of I-10 in Florida travels through some of the least-populated areas in the state, with large portions of I-10 west of I-295 in Jacksonville having only four lanes.

In Jacksonville, as in Arizona, I-10 is designated as the Pearl Harbor Memorial Highway. The route officially ends at the I-10/I-95 interchange northwest of Downtown Jacksonville. Throughout much of Florida, I-10 is also State Road 8 (SR 8), though it is not signed as such. (I-110 in Pensacola being known as SR 8A.)

== History ==
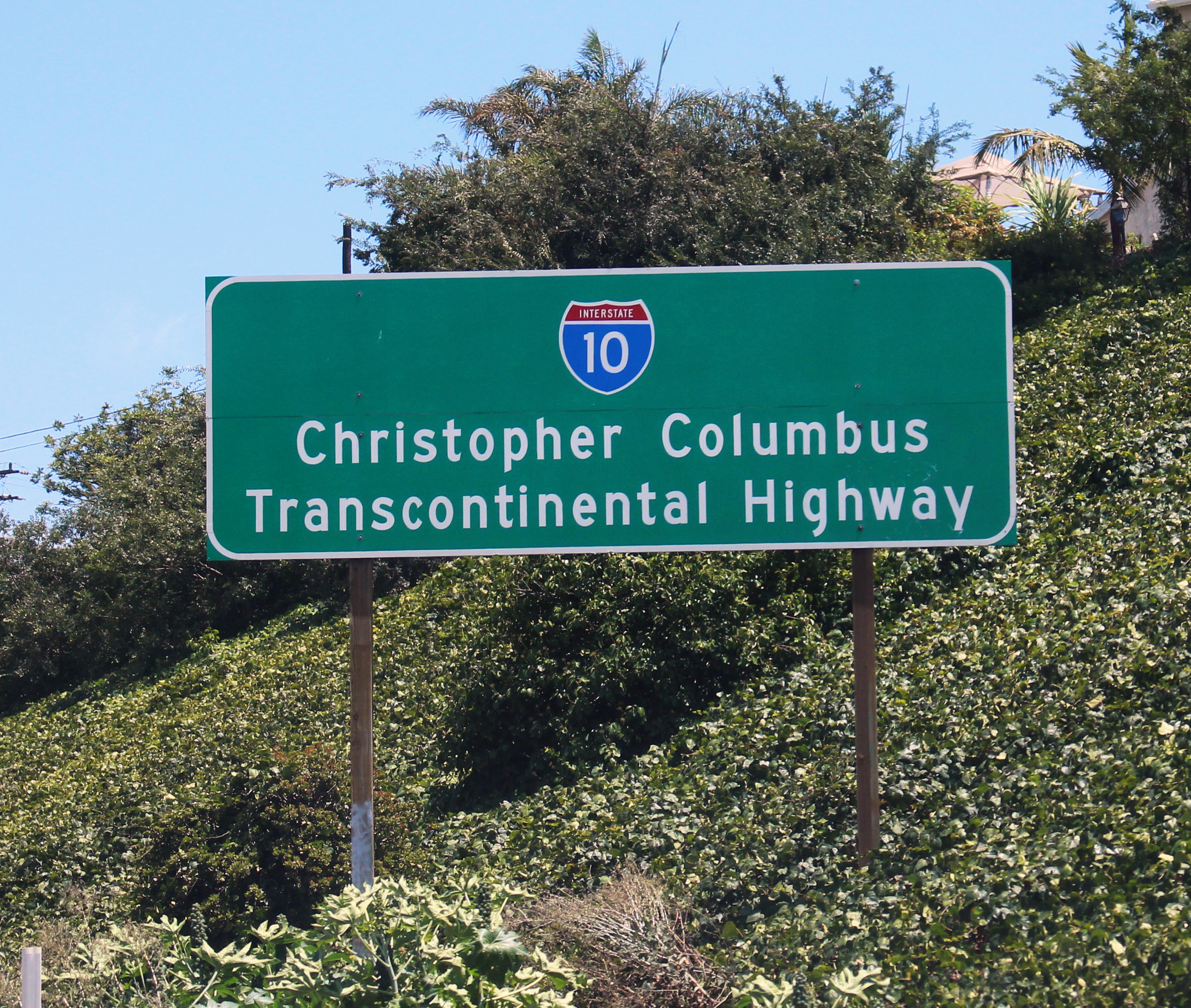
From 1976 to 2022, this sign in Santa Monica, California, (and predecessor signs) declared that I-10 is the "Christopher Columbus Transcontinental Highway", named for the Italian explorer and navigator

Construction of I-10 began in the 1950s, and the final segment of the cross-country route was completed in 1990, with the opening of the Deck Park Tunnel in Phoenix, Arizona. Since then, I-10 has seen continual expansion, modernization, and repair along key sections in several states.

Numerous widening projects have taken place throughout the 2000s and 2010s. In Florida, I-10 was widened to six lanes through Pensacola in 2008 and Tallahassee in 2009, improving traffic flow and hurricane evacuation capacity. In Arizona, major reconstruction projects in Tucson were completed in 2009, increasing lanes and building new bridges between Prince Road and 22nd Street. The corridor between Casa Grande and Marana underwent expansion from 2007 to 2009, and additional widening projects took place through Buckeye and Avondale, with HOV (high occupancy vehicle) lanes added in Goodyear and extended toward Loop 101.

One of the largest single improvement efforts was the Broadway Curve Improvement Project in Phoenix, which began in 2021 and finished in 2025. This 11-mile (18 km) reconstruction, the largest in Arizona Department of Transportation history, expanded I-10 to up to eight lanes, added collector distributor roads to separate local from through traffic, rebuilt major interchanges including SR 143, replaced bridges, and introduced new pedestrian crossing. These changes are designed to support a projected 25% increase in corridor traffic by 2040.

In Texas, the Katy Freeway Expansion Project in Houston was completed in 2008 and is among the largest freeways reconstructions in U.S. history. This project widened I-10 to as many as 26 lanes (including express and frontage lanes) and introduced managed toll lanes, substantially increasing capacity for commuters and freight movement. Additional managed lane and drainage improvements are underway on the Inner Katy Segment as of 2025, aimed at further reducing congestion and flood risk.

The Gulf Coast portion of I-10 has required extensive repairs following major hurricanes. After Hurricane Katrina in 2005, the Twin Span Bridge over Lake Pontchartrain near New Orleans, Louisiana, was severely damaged and rebuilt with federal funding, reopening with full lanes by September 2011. In Mississippi, emergency contracts restored the I-10 bridge over the Pascagoula River to two-lane traffic within weeks, with further reconstruction ongoing. These efforts underscored I-10's importance for disaster relief, evacuation, and regional recovery.

Louisiana and Mississippi, among other states, continue to upgrade portions of I-10 to improve safety, extend capacity, and harden infrastructure against future storms. Meanwhile, Arizona has advanced corridor improvements south of Phoenix along the Gila River community, adding lanes, new interchanges, and safety technology. Florida also continues to widen segments near Jacksonville and Tallahassee for hurricane evacuation efficiency.

== Junction list ==
California
SR 1 in Santa Monica
I-405 on the Mar Vista–Palms–West Los Angeles neighborhood line
I-110 in Downtown Los Angeles
I-5 in Boyle Heights; the highways travel concurrently through Boyle Heights.
US 101 in Boyle Heights
I-710 on the Monterey Park–Alhambra city line
I-605 in Baldwin Park
I-15 in Ontario
I-215 in Colton
Future I-210 / SR 210 in Redlands
US 95 in Blythe; the highways travel concurrently to Quartzsite, Arizona.
Arizona
US 95 in Quartzsite
US 60 southwest of Brenda
I-17 / US 60 in Phoenix
I-17 / US 60 in Phoenix
US 60 in Phoenix
I-8 in Casa Grande
I-19 in Tucson
US 191 north-northwest of Cochise; the highways travel concurrently to northeast of Willcox.
New Mexico
US 70 in Lordsburg; the highways travel concurrently to Las Cruces.
US 180 in Deming; the highways travel concurrently to El Paso, Texas.
I-25 / US 85 on the Las Cruces–University Park line. I-10/US 85 travels concurrently to El Paso, Texas
Texas
I-110 / US 54 in El Paso
US 62 / US 180 in El Paso
US 90 in Van Horn
I-20 in Reeves County
US 67 west of Fort Stockton; the highways travel concurrently to east-southeast of Fort Stockton.
US 285 in Fort Stockton
US 385 in Fort Stockton; the highways travel concurrently to east-southeast of Fort Stockton.
US 190 west-southwest of Iraan
US 277 in Sonora
US 83 / US 377 in Junction. I-10/US 83 travels concurrently to north of Segovia.
US 290 northwest of Mountain Home
US 87 in Comfort; the highways travel concurrently through San Antonio.
I-410 in San Antonio
I-35 in San Antonio; the highways travel concurrently through Downtown San Antonio.
I-35 / US 90 in San Antonio. I-10/US 90 travels concurrently to west-southwest of Seguin.
I-37 / US 281 in San Antonio
I-410 in San Antonio
US 90 in Seguin
US 183 in Luling
US 90 east of Waelder
US 77 in Schulenburg
US 90 east-northeast of Schulenburg
US 90 west-southwest of Glidden
US 90 east of Columbus; the highways travel concurrently to Sealy.
US 90 in Sealy; the highways travel concurrently to west-southwest of Brookshire.
US 90 in Katy; the highways travel concurrently through Houston.
I-610 in Houston
I-45 in Houston
I-69 / US 59 in Houston
I-610 / US 90 in Houston
US 69 / US 96 / US 287 in Beaumont; the highways travel concurrently through Beaumont.
US 90 in Beaumont
US 90 in Beaumont; the highways travel concurrently to Toomey, Louisiana.
Louisiana
I-210 east of Sulphur
US 90 west-southwest of Westlake; the highways travel concurrently through Lake Charles.
US 171 in Lake Charles
I-210 east-northeast of Lake Charles
US 165 east-northeast of Iowa
I-49 / US 167 in Lafayette
I-110 in Baton Rouge
I-12 in Baton Rouge
US 61 southeast of Sorrento
US 51 in LaPlace
I-55 in LaPlace
I-310 west of Kenner
I-610 in New Orleans
US 61 in New Orleans
US 90 in New Orleans
I-610 in New Orleans
US 90 in New Orleans
I-510 in New Orleans
US 11 in New Orleans
US 190 in Slidell
I-12 / I-59 in Slidell
Mississippi
US 49 in Gulfport
I-110 in D'Iberville
Alabama
US 90 on the Theodore–Tillmans Corner line.
I-65 in Mobile
US 90 / US 98 in Mobile
US 90 / US 98 east of Mobile
US 90 / US 98 in Daphne
Florida
US 29 on the Brent–Ensley CDP line
I-110 on the Brent–Ensley–Ferry Pass CDP line
US 90 in Ferry Pass
US 331 in DeFuniak Springs
US 231 south of Cottondale
US 90 in Midway
US 27 in Tallahassee
US 319 in Tallahassee
US 90 in Tallahassee
US 19 north-northeast of Capps
US 221 south-southeast of Greenville
US 90 southeast of Falmouth
US 129 north-northeast of Live Oak
I-75 south of White Springs
US 41 northwest of Five Points
US 441 in Lake City
US 90 southwest of Sanderson
US 301 south-southwest of Baldwin
I-295 in Jacksonville
US 17 in Jacksonville; the highways travel concurrently through Jacksonville
I-95 / US 17 in Jacksonville

== Auxiliary routes ==
- Los Angeles, California: I-110, I-210, I-710
- San Bernardino, California: I-210
- El Paso, Texas: I-110
- San Antonio, Texas: I-410
- Houston, Texas: I-610
- Lake Charles, Louisiana: I-210
- Baton Rouge, Louisiana: I-110
- New Orleans, Louisiana: I-310, I-510, I-610, I-910 (Unsigned)
- Gulfport, Mississippi: I-310 (Cancelled)
- Biloxi, Mississippi: I-110
- Pensacola, Florida: I-110
- Business routes of Interstate 10
