= Mississippi Highway 605 =

Highway in Mississippi

Mississippi Highway 605

Route information
- Maintained by MDOT
- Length: 16.6 mi (26.7 km)
- Existed: 2004–present

Major junctions
- South end: US 90 in Gulfport
- I-10 in Gulfport; MS 67 in Saucier
- North end: East Wortham Road in Saucier

Location
- Country: United States
- State: Mississippi
- Counties: Harrison

Highway system
- Mississippi State Highway System; Interstate; US; State
← MS 604	→ MS 606

Mississippi Highway 605 (MS 605) is a state highway in Mississippi. It is an expressway and generally runs north from U.S. Highway 90 in Gulfport, to an intersection with East Wortham Road in Saucier, after crossing over Mississippi Highway 67 twice. MS 605 is located entirely within Harrison County.

== History ==
Mississippi Highway 975
- Location: Gulfport
- Existed: ?–2004

Mississippi Highway 981
- Location: Gulfport - Saucier
- Existed: ?–2004

MS 605 first appeared in maps in 2004, and has not changed significantly since. Prior to its designation in 2004, the portion of MS 605 between I-10 and US 90 was known as Mississippi Highway 975 (MS 975), with the remaining portion north of I-10 known as Mississippi Highway 981 (MS 981).

== Major intersections ==
The entire route is in Harrison County.

Location	mi	km	Destinations	Notes
Gulfport	0.0	0.0	US 90 (Beach Boulevard) – Bay St. Louis, Biloxi	Southern terminus
Gulfport	4.2	6.8	I-10 – New Orleans, Mobile	I-10, exit 38
	11.6	18.7	MS 67 – Biloxi, Hattiesburg, William Carey University	Interchange
	14.7	23.7	MS 67 to US 49	
	16.6	26.7	East Wortham Road	Northern terminus
1.000 mi = 1.609 km; 1.000 km = 0.621 mi
