= Mississippi Highway 53 =

Highway in Mississippi

Mississippi Highway 53
- MS 53 highlighted in red

Route information
- Maintained by MDOT
- Length: 38.92 mi (62.64 km)
- Existed: 1950–present

Major junctions
- South end: US 49 in Gulfport
- I-59 in Poplarville
- North end: US 11 / MS 26 in Poplarville

Location
- Country: United States
- State: Mississippi
- Counties: Pearl River, Hancock, Harrison

Highway system
- Mississippi State Highway System; Interstate; US; State
← US 51	→ I-55

Mississippi Highway 53 (MS 53) is a state highway in Mississippi. The highway starts at U.S. Highway 49 (US 49) in Gulfport and travels northwestward to MS 603 in Hancock County. The road then travels north to Poplarville, meeting Interstate 59 (I-59). MS 53 ends at MS 26 and US 11 in southwestern Poplarville. The road that became MS 53 has existed since 1928, and the highway was designated in 1950. The highway was completely paved by 1957, and an interchange was created at I-59 in 1967.

== Route description ==
Traffic volume on Mississippi Highway 53
Location	Volume
East of Old US 49	8,100
East of Dawnland Drive	7,200
West of Forestry Road	5,500
Northwest of Wallace Saucier Road	2,500
West of Tally Shaw Road	1,600
Northwest of Dogwood Lane	2,800
South of Progress Road	2,900
Northwest of Herb Gentry Road	7,000
Southeast of Industrial Drive	6,800
East of US 11	8,100
Data was measured in 2015 in terms of AADT; Source:

MS 53 is located in Harrison, Hancock, and Pearl River counties. The highway is legally defined in Mississippi Code § 65-3-3, as part of the state highway system. The section from US 49 to MS 26 is known as the Larkin I. Smith Memorial Highway.

The highway starts at its intersection with US 49 and North Swan Road in northern Gulfport. The road travels westward towards the unincorporated area of Lyman after crossing over a KCS Railway railroad. MS 53 travels northwestward through Lizana and rural western Harrison County. At Herman Ladner Road, the highway turns westward and crosses the Wolf River, entering Hancock County.

Near Sellers in Hancock County, the road travels northwest to its T-intersection at MS 603. MS 53 turns northward at the intersection, and shifts westward at Dogwood Lane, south of the county line. The highway enters Pearl River County past Road 205. Once inside Pearl River County, the road intersects multiple private driveways through the farmland. At Savannah, MS 53 intersects Savannah Millard Road, which has an interchange at I-59. Past Jesse Wells and Restertown Roads, the highway intersects a road that leads to the Poplarville-Pearl River County Airport. The highway enters Poplarville near the diamond interchange at I-59, and it becomes concurrent with MS 26. MS 53 ends at US 11 after crossing a Norfolk Southern railroad and Jumpoff Creek.

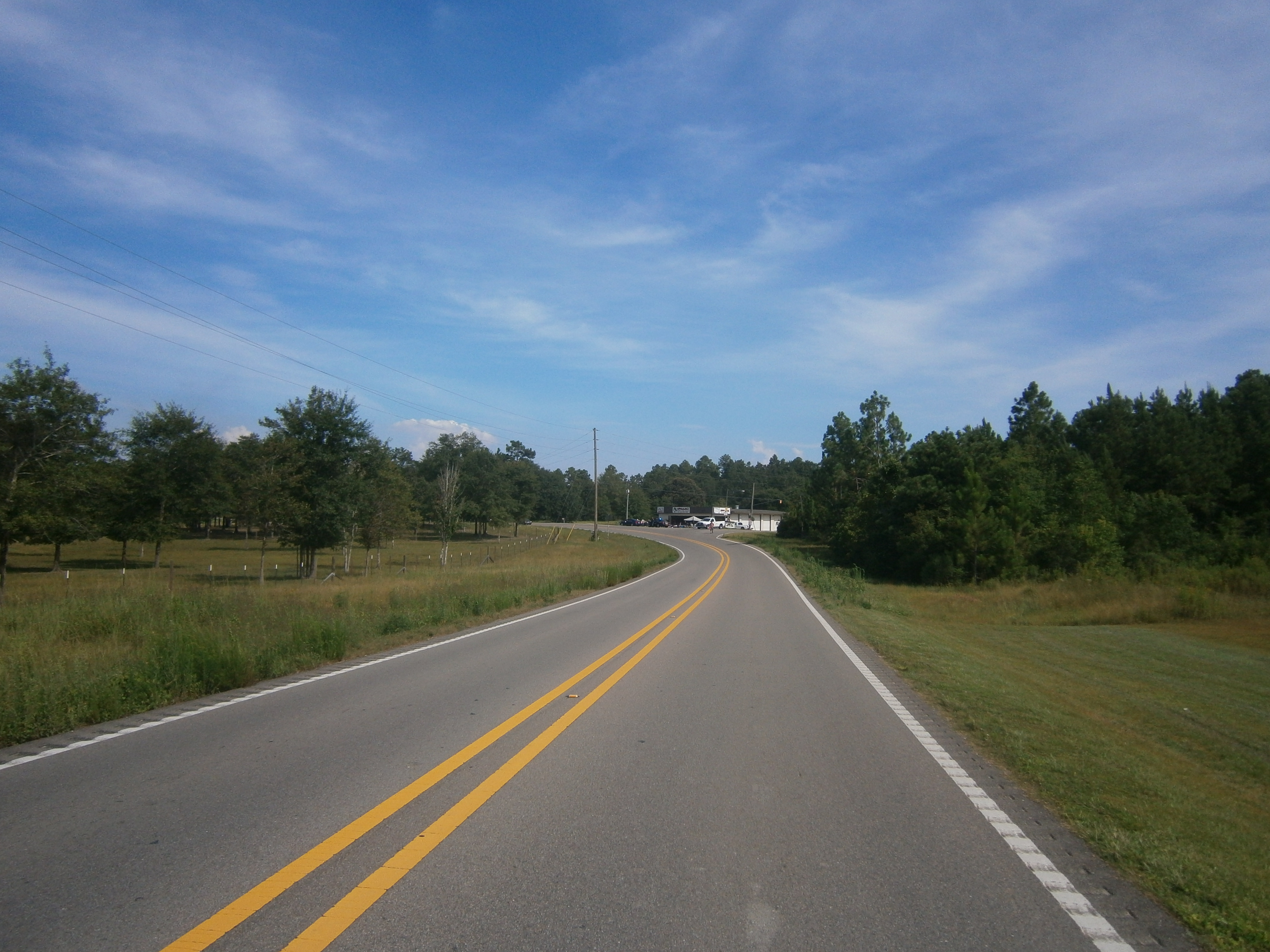
MS 53 in Lizana

== History ==
The road that became MS 53 existed at least since 1928, as a gravel road from Lyman to Poplarville. A small section of the road near Poplarville was paved in 1939. By 1948, a few miles of the road near Lyman was paved, and MS 53 was designated along the road two years later. Almost all of MS 53 in Harrison County was paved by 1953. A small portion in Pearl River County was also paved during this time. The Pearl River section of the highway was near completely paved by 1956, and all of the highway was completely paved one year later. By 1967, an interchange was created at I-59 and MS 53.

== Major intersections ==
County	Location	mi	km	Destinations	Notes
Harrison	Gulfport	0.0	0.0	US 49 – Wiggins, Gulfport	Southern terminus
Hancock		21.2	34.1	MS 603 south – Kiln, Bay St. Louis	Northern terminus of MS 603
Pearl River	Poplarville	36.8– 37.0	59.2– 59.5	I-59 – New Orleans, Hattiesburg	I-59 exit 27; Diamond interchange
Pearl River	Poplarville	38.9	62.6	MS 26 east – Bogalusa, Wiggins	Southern end of MS 26 concurrency
Pearl River	Poplarville	39.7	63.9	US 11 / MS 26 west – Bogalusa, Picayune, Lumberton	Northern end of MS 26 concurrency; northern terminus
1.000 mi = 1.609 km; 1.000 km = 0.621 mi: Concurrency terminus
