= Grass Lawn (Gulfport, Mississippi) =

Historic house in Mississippi, United States

- Formerly listed on the U.S. National Register of Historic Places
- Mississippi Landmark (Grasslawn II)
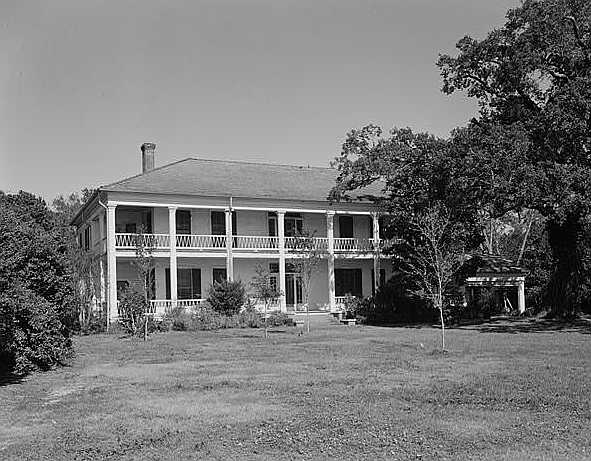
- Grass Lawn in 1978

- Location within Mississippi Location within the United States
- Location: 720 East Beach Boulevard, Gulfport, Mississippi
- Coordinates: 30°22′31.91″N 89°03′47.76″W
- Built: 1836
- Architect: Hiram A. Roberts
- Architectural style: Greek Revival
- NRHP reference No.: 72000692
- USMS No.: 047-GLF-0236.2-ML

Significant dates
- Destroyed: 2005
- Added to NRHP: July 31, 1972
- Designated USMS: January 01, 2010
- Removed from NRHP: July 16, 2008

Grass Lawn, also known as the Milner House, was a two-story Antebellum home located in Gulfport, Harrison County, Mississippi. In 1972, the home was added to the National Register of Historic Places. In 2005, the home was destroyed during Hurricane Katrina. A replica of Grass Lawn, Grasslawn II, was built and was designated a Mississippi Landmark in 2010. The new structure was dedicated in 2012 for use in city events, weddings, receptions, and parties.

== History ==
Grass Lawn was constructed in 1836 as a summer home for Dr. Hiram A. Roberts, a Port Gibson surgeon and owner of sugarcane plantations in Louisiana. The house was located in Gulfport, Mississippi on 235 acres (95.1ha) overlooking the Mississippi Sound. Grass Lawn was unique in that it was of wood-pegged construction with timbers of hand-hewn longleaf pine and walls of bald cypress. Heart-pine lumber was used as flooring, and fireplace mantels were composed of either black or white marble. The 2-story home had 10-foot-wide (3-meter-wide) porches supported by box columns.

Through the years, the property was subdivided, and in 1905, John Kennedy Milner purchased the home. Milner later became owner of the Coast Coca-Cola Bottling Company in Gulfport.

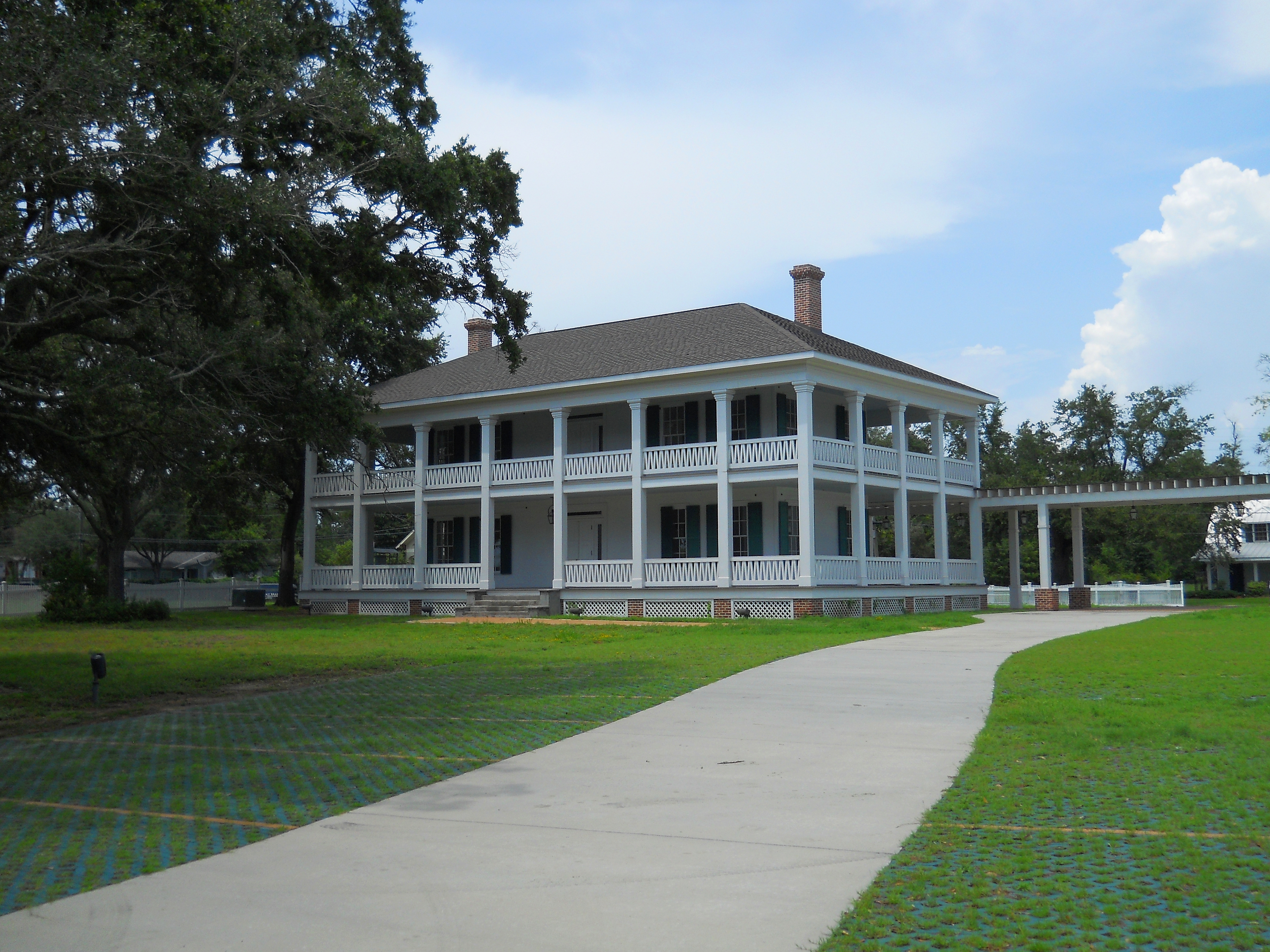
Replica of Grass Lawn 2012, designated Grasslawn II

In 1972, because of its political, historical, and architectural significance, Grass Lawn was placed on the National Register of Historic Places. In 1973, the Milner Family sold the home to the City of Gulfport. During the next 32 years, the house was used by the city as a community center for both private and public gatherings.

On August 29, 2005, Grass Lawn was destroyed during Hurricane Katrina. In the aftermath of the hurricane, government officials committed to construct a period-style replica of Grass Lawn to serve as a visible reminder of historic buildings on the Mississippi Gulf Coast. The completed structure was dedicated on July 20, 2012, to be used for city functions, and rented out for weddings, receptions, and other events.
