= Mississippi Highway 26 =

Highway in Mississippi

Mississippi Highway 26
- MS 26 highlighted in blue

Route information
- Maintained by MDOT
- Length: 77.05 mi (124.00 km)
- Existed: 1932–present

Major junctions
- West end: LA 10 at the Louisiana state line near Bogalusa, LA
- US 11 in Poplarville; I-59 in Poplarville; US 49 in Wiggins
- East end: MS 198 in Lucedale

Location
- Country: United States
- State: Mississippi
- Counties: Pearl River, Stone, George

Highway system
- Mississippi State Highway System; Interstate; US; State
← MS 25	→ MS 27

Mississippi Highway 26 (MS 26) is a 77.05-mile-long (124.00 km) state highway in southern Mississippi. It runs from a continuation of Louisiana Highway 10 (LA 10) east through Pearl River, Stone, and George counties to MS 198 in Lucedale. Along the way it intersects several major highways including U.S. Route 11 (US 11) in Poplarville, Interstate 59 (I-59) in Poplarville, and US 49 in Wiggins.

In late September, 2021, a section of MS 26 six miles (9.7 km) east of Benndale collapsed due to heavy rains from Hurricane Ida and killed three people.

== Route description ==
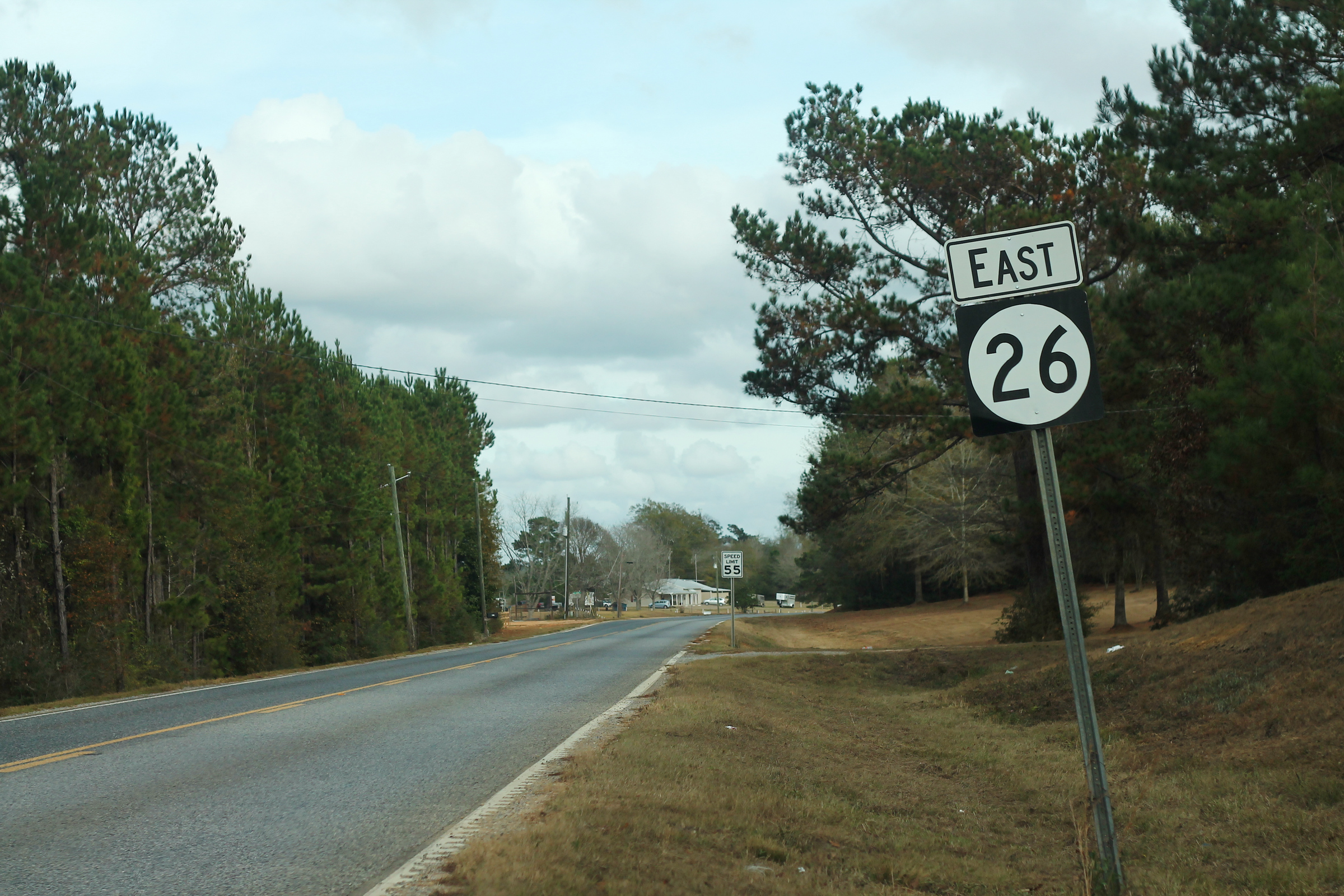
Sign for MS 26 eastbound

MS 26 begins in Pearl River County at the Louisiana state line at a bridge over the Pearl River, where it continues west across the bridge into Bogalusa as Louisiana Highway 10 (LA 10). It heads east through woodlands for a couple miles to pass through the community of Crossroads, where it has an intersection with MS 43, before passing through rural for the next several miles, where it crosses White Sand Creek. The highway travels through the suburb of West Poplarville before entering the town of Poplarville, bypassing downtown to the south as it has an intersection with US 11 (where it becomes concurrent (overlapped) with MS 53) and crosses a bridge over some railroad tracks. MS 26 now passes through a business district, where MS 53 splits off, before having an interchange with I-59 (Exit 29) before leaving Poplarville and crossing the Wolf River. The highway travels through rural woodlands before entering Stone County.

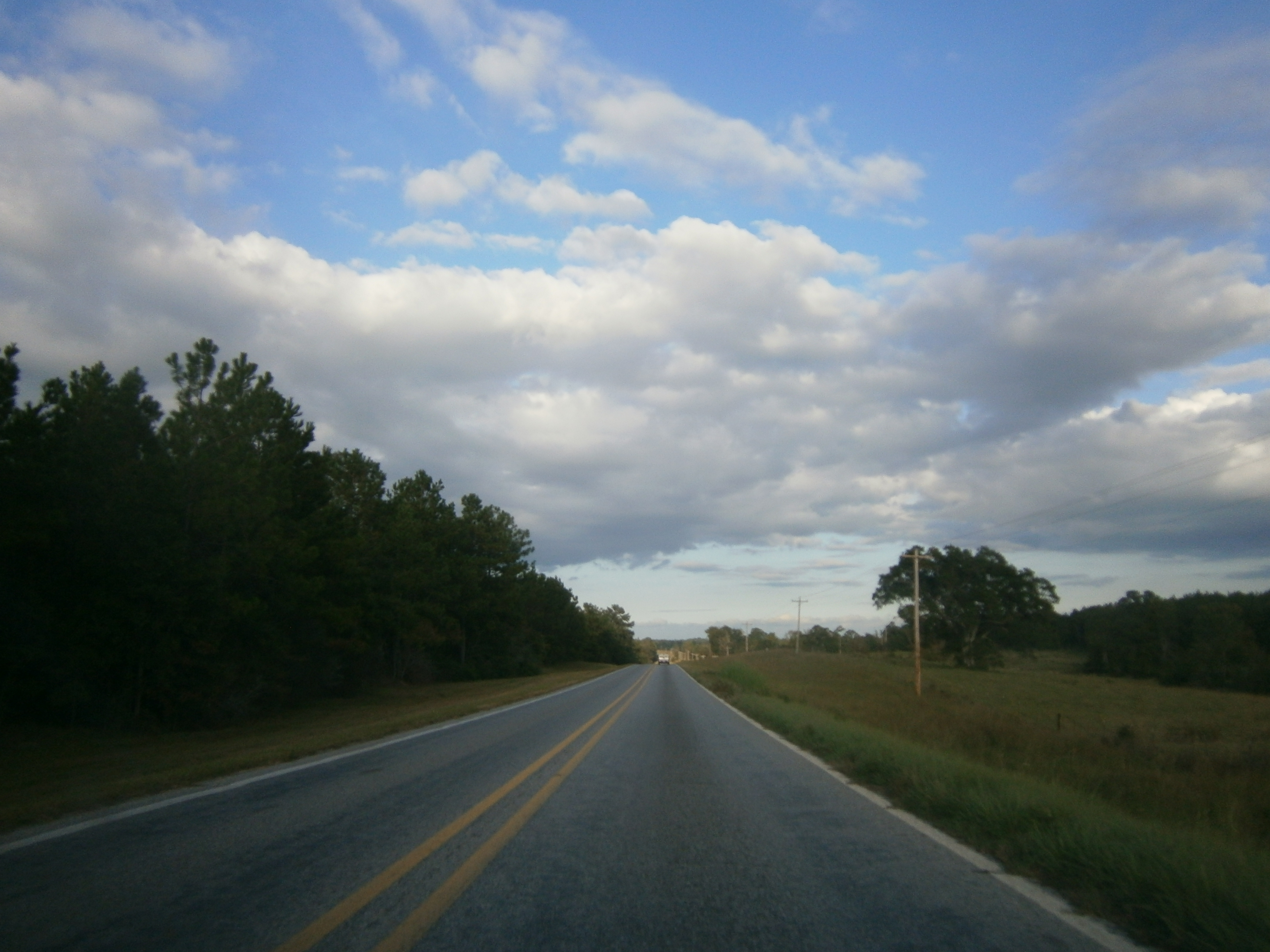
Typical scenery along Mississippi Highway 26

MS 26 travels through a mix of farmland and wooded areas for several miles to cross Black Creek before entering the town of Wiggins. It passes through some neighborhoods before passing by the town's airport and having an interchange with US 49. The highway passes through more neighborhoods as Central Avenue before passing along the southern edge of downtown as it has an interchange between MS 29 and MS 149. MS 26 passes through more neighborhoods before leaving Wiggins and traveling through farmland for the next several miles. The highway passes through the community of Whites Crossing before traveling through the southern portion of De Soto National Forest, where it has an intersection with the southern section of MS 15, before entering George County.

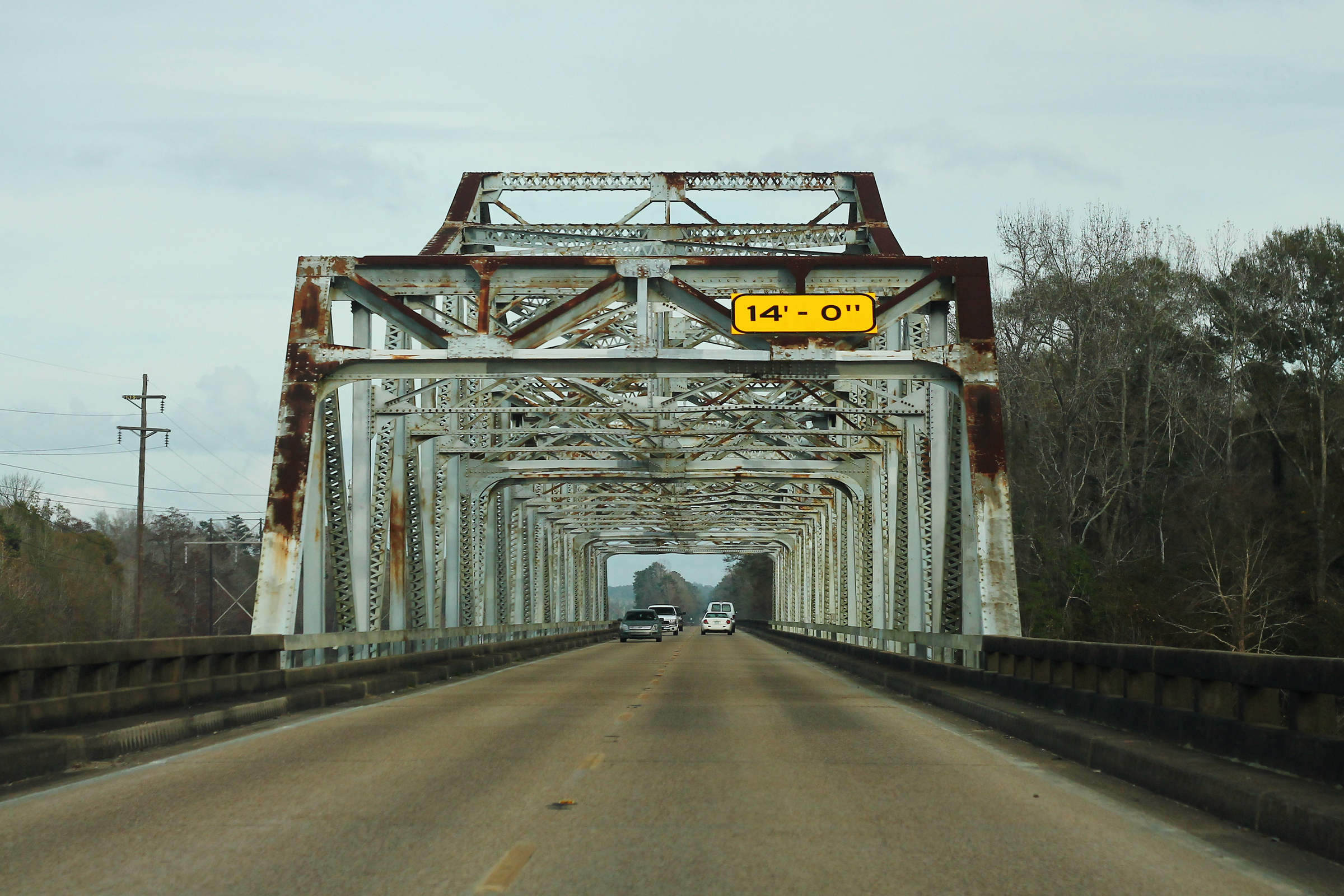
The Pascagoula River bridge along MS 26 eastbound

MS 26 crosses Cypress Creek before traveling through the community of Benndale, where it has a junction with MS 57. It now crosses the Pascagoula River, and passes through the community of Crossroads, before having an interchange with MS 63 to enter the town of Lucedale along Winter Street. The highway passes through a business district, where it has an intersection with Old Highway 63 before entering downtown, where it comes to an end at an intersection with MS 198 (Main Street).

The entire length of Mississippi Highway 26 is a rural two-lane highway.

== History ==
On August 31, 2021, two people were killed and at least ten others were injured when their vehicles plunged into a deep hole on a collapsed section of Highway 26 nearly six miles east of Benndale. Heavy rains from Hurricane Ida caused the highway to collapse. On September 11, 2021, one of the others injured died bringing the death toll to three. By late September, the Department of Transportation announced that a geotechnical review was finished and that a company will be chosen by early October to repair the damage. On Thursday, October 7, the Department of Transportation awarded a $1.8 million contract to T.L. Wallace Construction, of Columbia. The road is expected to be opened in early winter 2021, and totally complete by early 2022.

== Major intersections ==
County	Location	mi	km	Destinations	Notes
Pearl River		0.0	0.0	LA 10 west – Bogalusa	Western terminus; Louisiana state line
Pearl River		2.9	4.7	MS 43 – Columbia, Picayune	
Pearl River	Poplarville	17.3	27.8	US 11 – Lumberton, Picayune MS 53 begins	Western end of MS 53 concurrency; northern terminus of MS 53
Pearl River	Poplarville	18.0	29.0	MS 53 south – Necaise	Eastern end of MS 53 concurrency
Pearl River	Poplarville	20.2– 20.4	32.5– 32.8	I-59 – Hattiesburg, New Orleans	I-59 exit 29; diamond interchange
Stone	Wiggins	40.8– 40.9	65.7– 65.8	US 49 – Hattiesburg, Gulf Coast	Diamond interchange
Stone	Wiggins	41.9	67.4	MS 29 north / MS 149 – Perkinston, Downtown Wiggins	Partial cloverleaf interchange; southern terminus of MS 29
Stone		50.5	81.3	MS 15 south – Biloxi	Northern terminus of southern section of MS 15
George		62.1	99.9	MS 57 – McLain, Vancleave	
George		73.6– 73.7	118.4– 118.6	MS 63 – Leakesville, Moss Point	Diamond interchange
George	Lucedale	77.1	124.1	MS 198 – McLain, Leakesville, Mobile	Eastern terminus
1.000 mi = 1.609 km; 1.000 km = 0.621 mi: Concurrency terminus
