= Henderson Point, Mississippi =

- Census-designated place
- Location within Mississippi Location within the United States
- Coordinates: 30°18′33″N 89°17′13″W
- Country: United States
- State: Mississippi
- County: Harrison

Area
  - Total: 1.15 sq mi (2.99 km^{2})
  - Land: 1.07 sq mi (2.76 km^{2})
  - Water: 0.089 sq mi (0.23 km^{2})
- Elevation: 5 ft (1.5 m)

Population (2020)
  - Total: 232
  - Density: 218/sq mi (84.1/km^{2})
- Time zone: UTC-6 (Central (CST))
  - Summer (DST): UTC-5 (CDT)
- FIPS code: 28-31540

Henderson Point is a census-designated place (CDP) in Harrison County, Mississippi, United States. It is part of the Gulfport–Biloxi Metropolitan Statistical Area. As of the 2020 census, Henderson Point had a population of 232.

== Geography ==
Henderson Point is located at the end of a peninsula along the edge of the Gulf of Mexico. It is bordered by St. Louis Bay to the west and north, the Gulf of Mexico to the south, and the city of Pass Christian to the east. Henderson Point is the site of the east end of the Bay St. Louis Bridge, which carries U.S. Route 90 across St. Louis Bay to the city of Bay St. Louis in Hancock County.

According to the United States Census Bureau, the CDP has a total area of 1.2 square miles (3.0 km^{2}), of which 1.0 square mile (2.7 km^{2}) is land and 0.12 square miles (0.3 km^{2}), or 8.64%, is water.

== Demographics ==
Historical population
Census	Pop.	Note	%±
2010	170		—
2020	232		36.5%
U.S. Decennial Census

Henderson Point first appeared as a census designated place in the 2010 U.S. census.

=== Racial and ethnic composition ===
Henderson Point CDP, Mississippi – Racial and ethnic composition Note: the US Census treats Hispanic/Latino as an ethnic category. This table excludes Latinos from the racial categories and assigns them to a separate category. Hispanics/Latinos may be of any race.
Race / Ethnicity (NH = Non-Hispanic)	Pop 2010	Pop 2020	% 2010	% 2020
White alone (NH)	162	208	95.29%	89.66%
Black or African American alone (NH)	5	0	2.94%	0.00%
Native American or Alaska Native alone (NH)	0	0	0.00%	0.00%
Asian alone (NH)	0	2	0.00%	0.86%
Native Hawaiian or Pacific Islander alone (NH)	0	0	0.00%	0.00%
Other race alone (NH)	0	1	0.00%	0.43%
Mixed race or Multiracial (NH)	2	11	1.18%	4.74%
Hispanic or Latino (any race)	1	10	0.59%	4.31%
Total	170	232	100.00%	100.00%

=== 2020 census ===
As of the 2020 United States census, there were 232 people, 91 households, and 37 families residing in the CDP.
