= Interstate 110 (Mississippi) =

Highway in Mississippi

Interstate 110
- I-110 highlighted in red

Route information
- Auxiliary route of I-10
- Maintained by MDOT
- Length: 4.10 mi (6.60 km)
- Existed: 1988–present
- NHS: Entire route

Major junctions
- South end: US 90 in Biloxi
- North end: I-10 / MS 15 / MS 67 in D'Iberville

Location
- Country: United States
- State: Mississippi
- Counties: Harrison

Highway system
- Interstate Highway System; Main; Auxiliary; Suffixed; Business; Future; Mississippi State Highway System; Interstate; US; State
← US 98	→ MS 145

Interstate 110 (I-110) is a 4.1-mile (6.6 km) freeway spur route in Biloxi, Mississippi, running south from I-10 to U.S. Route 90 (US 90). It is one of very few places on the Interstate Highway System utilizing a drawbridge. The southbound control city is Biloxi, with a series of bridges out over the Gulf of Mexico at the southern terminus. There is no northbound control city; the road is marked with trailblazers reading "TO I-10" instead. It ran entirely concurrently with Mississippi Highway 15 (MS 15), until MS 15 was truncated to I-10.

The route of I-110 is defined in Mississippi Code Annotated § 65-3-3. The road is officially known as the John C. Stennis–Joseph Anthony "Tony" Creel Parkway, in honor of the former U.S. senator and Biloxi City Commissioner, respectively.

== Route description ==
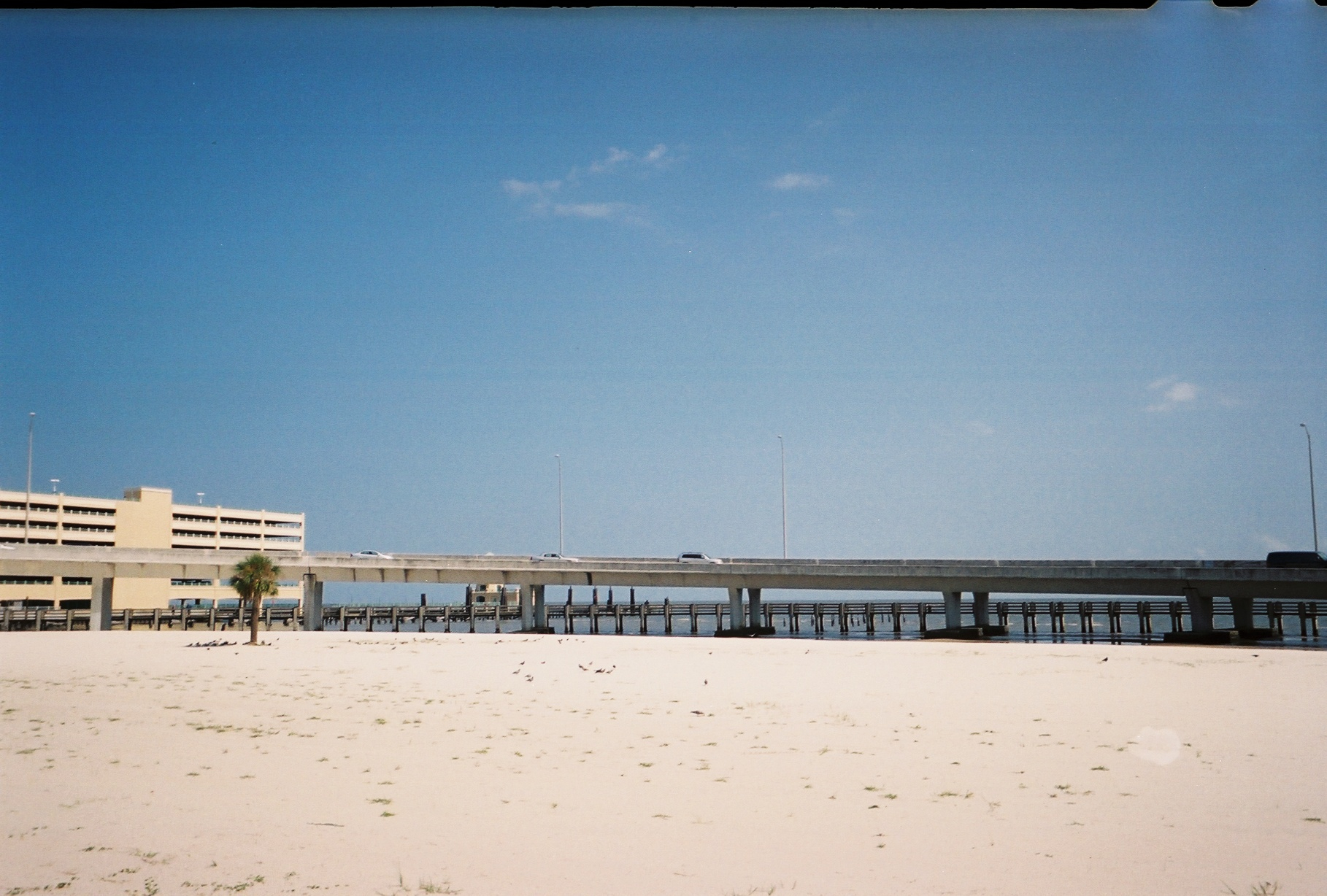
I-110 bridges over the Gulf of Mexico where it meets its terminus at US 90

I-110 begins at an interchange with US 90 on the Gulf of Mexico in Biloxi. The ramps to and from US 90 eastbound pass over the gulf and the beach. From US 90, the ramps from eastbound US 90 and from westbound US 90 merge, and the route heads north as a four-lane freeway through residential and commercial areas, passing over CSX's NO&M Subdivision railroad line. The highway comes to a southbound exit and northbound entrance serving Division Street. Farther north, I-110 comes to a southbound exit and northbound entrance with Bayview Avenue. After this, the freeway crosses the Biloxi Bay on a drawbridge into D'Iberville. Here, the road comes to a diverging diamond interchange with Rodriguez Street and continues north through areas of homes and businesses. I-110 reaches its northern terminus at a cloverleaf interchange with I-10, at which point the road continues north as MS 15/MS 67.

== History ==
Completed in the late 1980s, it is the latest interstate to be numbered I-110.

In 2012, Mississippi Department of Transportation (MDOT) officials started a project to extend I-110 past the Sangani Boulevard intersection across the Tchoutacabouffa River back into Biloxi city proper to end at an intersection with Brandon James Drive. The extension would include a new overpass for Sangani Boulevard/Promanade Parkway and a new interstate-grade intersection between I-110 and Sangani/Promanade. The overpass was completed in July 2013 for a cost of $7.3 million.

== Exit list ==
The entire route is in Harrison County.

Location	mi	km	Exit	Destinations	Notes
Biloxi	0.00	0.00	1A-B	US 90 – Gulfport, Keesler AFB, Ocean Springs	Southern terminus; signed as exits 1A (east) and 1B (west)
Biloxi	0.63	1.01	1C	Division Street	Southbound exit and northbound entrance
Biloxi	1.21	1.95	1D	Bayview Avenue	Southbound exit and northbound entrance
D'Iberville	2.48	3.99	2	D'Iberville	
D'Iberville	3.63	5.84	4A	Popps Ferry Road / Big Ridge Road	Northbound exit and southbound entrance
D'Iberville	4.10	6.60	4	I-10 / MS 15 north / MS 67 north – Pascagoula, Mobile, Gulfport, New Orleans	Northern terminus; signed as exits 4B (east) and 4C (west) northbound; I-10 exits 46A-B; roadway continues as MS 15/MS 67
1.000 mi = 1.609 km; 1.000 km = 0.621 mi: Incomplete access
