= Benndale, Mississippi =

- Census-designated place
- Location within Mississippi Location within the United States
- Coordinates: 30°52′18″N 88°48′25″W
- Country: United States
- State: Mississippi
- County: George

Area
  - Total: 1.51 sq mi (3.91 km^{2})
  - Land: 1.51 sq mi (3.91 km^{2})
  - Water: 0 sq mi (0.00 km^{2})

Population (2020)
  - Total: 65
  - Density: 43.1/sq mi (16.63/km^{2})
- Time zone: UTC-6 (Central (CST))
  - Summer (DST): UTC-5 (CDT)
- FIPS code: 28-05180
- GNIS feature ID: 691696

Benndale is a census-designated place (CDP) and unincorporated community in George County, Mississippi, near the intersection of State Highways 26 (MS 26) and 57 (MS 57). It is part of the Pascagoula Metropolitan Statistical Area. Prior to the creation of George County, Benndale was located in Jackson County. The 2020 United States census listed a population of 65.

== Background ==
Benndale Elementary School, a K-6 campus that is part of the George County School District, serves Benndale and surrounding areas.

A post office operated under the name Benndale from 1900 to 1967.

The Farnworth Lumber Company once operated a lumber camp in Benndale.

The Benndale soil series is named for the community.

== 2020 demographics ==
Historical population
Census	Pop.	Note	%±
2020	65		—
U.S. Decennial Census; 2020

Benndale first appeared as a census designated place in the 2020 U.S. census.

=== Racial and ethnic composition ===
Benndale CDP, Mississippi – Racial and ethnic composition Note: the US Census treats Hispanic/Latino as an ethnic category. This table excludes Latinos from the racial categories and assigns them to a separate category. Hispanics/Latinos may be of any race.
Race / Ethnicity (NH = Non-Hispanic)	Pop 2020	2020
White alone (NH)	58	89.23%
Black or African American alone (NH)	3	4.62%
Native American or Alaska Native alone (NH)	0	0.00%
Asian alone (NH)	0	0.00%
Native Hawaiian or Pacific Islander alone (NH)	0	0.00%
Other race alone (NH)	0	0.00%
Mixed race or Multiracial (NH)	1	1.54%
Hispanic or Latino (any race)	3	4.62%
Total	65	100.00%
