= Interstate 10 in Mississippi =

Highway in Mississippi

Interstate 10
- I-10 highlighted in red

Route information
- Maintained by MDOT
- Length: 77.056 mi (124.010 km)
- NHS: Entire route

Major junctions
- West end: I-10 at the Louisiana state line near Pearlington
- US 49 in Gulfport; I-110 in D'Iberville
- East end: I-10 at the Alabama state line near Grand Bay, AL

Location
- Country: United States
- State: Mississippi
- Counties: Hancock, Harrison, Jackson

Highway system
- Interstate Highway System; Main; Auxiliary; Suffixed; Business; Future; Mississippi State Highway System; Interstate; US; State
← MS 9W	→ US 11

Interstate 10 (I-10), a major east–west Interstate Highway in the southern areas of the United States, has a section of about 77 miles (124 km) in Mississippi.

== Route description ==
I-10 enters the Gulf Coast area of Mississippi from Louisiana after crossing the East Pearl River. The highway parallels US Route 90 (US 90) to the north, traversing the southern parts of the three southernmost counties in the state: Hancock, Harrison, and Jackson.

As I-10 enters the Gulfport–Biloxi metropolitan area, its median widens shortly after crossing the Pearl River. The eastbound Mississippi Welcome Center is off the highway at exit 2 (Mississippi Highway 607, MS 607), and the eastbound truck weigh station can be found just west of exit 13 (MS 43/MS 603). Shortly after exit 13, I-10 widens from four to six lanes. The highway then crosses a bridge over the Jourdan River and enters Diamondhead, where the interstate serves as a buffer between the communities and the north shore of Bay of St. Louis while crossing the Hancock–Harrison county line at the same time.

The highway passes through the northern section of Mississippi's second-largest city, Gulfport, and has a cloverleaf interchange with US 49 (exit 34) crossing a railway line, US 49 itself, and Bayou Bernard in the process, respectively. Additionally, the interchange is north of the flight plan for planes at Gulfport–Biloxi International Airport. The crossing of these two roads is officially recognized as the Castiglia Interchange. Four miles (6.4 km) later, I-10 intersects MS 605 (Lorraine Road), which provides access to Gulfport's eastern neighborhoods and crosses the Biloxi River. A short distance later, the road crosses the Tchoutacabouffa River before entering the northern sections of Biloxi. After two diamond interchanges, collective–distributor roads can be found on both sides at exits 46A–D. The eastbound exits here are for D'Iberville Boulevard (exit 46A), I-110 (southbound exit 46B), as well as northbound MS 15 and MS 67. The westbound exits are for Lamey Bridge Road (exit 46D), northbound MS 15/MS 67 (exit 46C), and southbound I-110 (exit 46B). Shortly after the semi-complex interchange, the route crosses the Harrison–Jackson county line.

No other interchanges exist within Jackson County until over three miles (4.8 km) later at MS 609 (exit 50), and the road narrows back down to four lanes east of MS 57 (exit 57) north of Ocean Springs. One last interchange can be found in Gautier west of a pair of rest areas on both sides of the road. A connecting U-turn for official and emergency vehicles links both rest areas with one another. Immediately after the rest areas, I-10 uses a long causeway to cross the West Pascagoula River, several unnamed creeks and rivers, wetlands, and swamps, before crossing the main channel.

East of the Pascagoula wetlands, the road enters the northern section of Moss Point. Two interchanges with MS 613 and MS 63 provide access to the city of Pascagoula and are in close proximity to one another before I-10 starts to head northeastward. Following a shorter causeway over the Escatawpa River and its wetlands, I-10 has one last eastbound truck weigh station across the road from the westbound Mississippi Welcome Center, followed by one last interchange, for Franklin Creek Road (exit 75). The first westbound truck weigh station can be spotted across the road before I-10 finally enters Alabama after trekking 77 miles (124 km) in the Magnolia State.

== History ==
I-10 was built in 1982 throughout Mississippi. It was originally completed in Alabama and Louisiana before Mississippi completed its portion. I-10 in Alabama routed onto US 90 at the state line, which was the default roadway across southern Mississippi before I-10 was completed. Today, US 90 is not directly accessible from I-10. When coming from Louisiana, I-10 ended at MS 607 (exit 2). Today, entering Mississippi from Louisiana, the first 12 miles (19 km) is the NASA John C. Stennis Space Center easement zone. To this day, I-10 displays the control city of Bay St. Louis from traveling from New Orleans, Louisiana; and Pascagoula from traveling from Mobile, Alabama.

== Exit list ==
County	Location	mi	km	Exit	Destinations	Notes
Hancock		0.0	0.0		I-10 west – New Orleans	Continuation into Louisiana
Hancock		2.8	4.5	2	MS 607 – NASA John C. Stennis Space Center, Waveland	
Hancock	Bay St. Louis	13.7	22.0	13	MS 43 / MS 603 – Bay St. Louis, Kiln, Picayune	
Hancock	Diamondhead	16.6	26.7	16	Diamondhead Drive	
Harrison	Diamondhead	20.7	33.3	20	Kiln Delisle Road	
Harrison		24.7	39.8	24	Firetower Road / Menge Avenue	
Harrison		28.3	45.5	28	Country Farm Road	
Harrison	Gulfport	31.6	50.9	31	Canal Road	
Harrison	Gulfport	32.0	51.5	32	Future I-310 south / MS 601 north – Gulfport	proposed
Harrison	Gulfport	34.2	55.0	34	US 49 – Gulfport, Hattiesburg	Signed as exits 34A (south) and 34B (north)
Harrison	Gulfport	38.0	61.2	38	MS 605 (Lorraine-Cowan Road) – Bernard Bayou Industrial District	
Harrison	Gulfport	41.9	67.4	41	Old Mississippi 67 – Woolmarket	
Harrison	Biloxi	44.3	71.3	44	Cedar Lake Road – Coast Coliseum	
Harrison	D'Iberville	46.6	75.0	46A	Galleria Parkway	Eastbound exit and westbound entrance; diverging diamond interchange
Harrison	D'Iberville	46.6	75.0	46B	I-110 south – Biloxi, Keesler AFB	Exits 4A-B on I-110 southbound; exits 4B-C I-110 northbound; exits 46B&C joined by collector-distributor lanes; southern terminus of MS 15 and MS 67; cloverleaf interchange.
Harrison	D'Iberville	46.6	75.0	46C	MS 15 north / MS 67 north	Exits 4A-B on I-110 southbound; exits 4B-C I-110 northbound; exits 46B&C joined by collector-distributor lanes; southern terminus of MS 15 and MS 67; cloverleaf interchange.
Harrison	D'Iberville	46.6	75.0	46D	Lamey Bridge Road	Eastbound entrance and westbound exit
Jackson	Ocean Springs	49.8	80.1	50	MS 609 south – Ocean Springs	Northern terminus of MS 609
Jackson	Gautier	57.5	92.5	57	MS 57 – Vancleave, Gautier, Ocean Springs	
Jackson	Gautier	61.4	98.8	61	Gautier Vancleave Road – Gautier, Vancleave	
Jackson	Moss Point	68.0	109.4	68	MS 613 – Moss Point, Pascagoula	
Jackson	Moss Point	69.0	111.0	69	MS 63 – East Moss Point, East Pascagoula	
Jackson	Pascagoula	75.8	122.0	75	Franklin Creek Road	
Jackson		77.0	123.9		I-10 east – Mobile	Continuation into Alabama
1.000 mi = 1.609 km; 1.000 km = 0.621 mi: Incomplete access

== Auxiliary routes ==
- I-110 is a spur into Biloxi
- I-310 is a former proposed spur into Gulfport

Interstate 10
Previous state: Louisiana	Mississippi	Next state: Alabama
