= Harrison County, Mississippi =

County in Mississippi, United States

- County
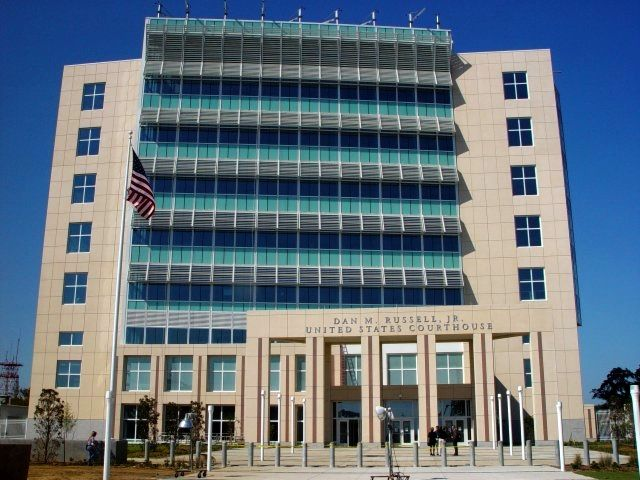
- Dan M. Russell Jr. United States Courthouse in Gulfport, Harrison County

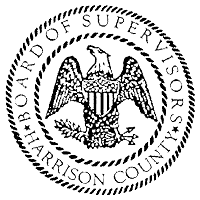
- Flag Seal

- Location within the U.S. state of Mississippi
- Coordinates: 30°25′N 89°05′W
- Country: United States
- State: Mississippi
- Founded: 1841
- Named for: William Henry Harrison
- Seat: Biloxi and Gulfport
- Largest city: Gulfport

Area
  - Total: 976 sq mi (2,530 km^{2})
  - Land: 574 sq mi (1,490 km^{2})
  - Water: 402 sq mi (1,040 km^{2}) 41%

Population (2020)
  - Total: 208,621
  - Estimate (2025): 217,136 ▲
  - Density: 363/sq mi (140/km^{2})
- Time zone: UTC−6 (Central)
  - Summer (DST): UTC−5 (CDT)
- Congressional district: 4th
- Website: harrisoncountyms.gov

Harrison County is a county located in the U.S. state of Mississippi. As of the 2020 census, Harrison County is the second-most populous county in Mississippi with a population of 208,621; although the most recent population estimate from 2025 suggests Harrison County has overtaken Hinds County to become the state's most populous county, with a population of 217,136. Its county seats are Biloxi and Gulfport. The county is named after U.S. President William Henry Harrison. Harrison County is part of the Gulfport-Biloxi metropolitan area. The county was severely damaged from both Hurricane Camille on August 17, 1969, and Hurricane Katrina on August 29, 2005, causing catastrophic effects.

== History ==
Harrison County, established on February 5, 1841, is named after President William Henry Harrison. Gulfport and Biloxi are the county seats. Located on the Gulf Coast, it was created from portions of Hancock, Jackson, and Perry counties.

Mississippi's Gulf Coast played an important role in colonial history, serving as a meeting point for European settlers and Native Americans. In 1699, the French established Fort Maurepas, the first European capital in Mississippi, with leaders like Pierre Le Moyne and Jean-Baptiste Le Moyne. Bienville, a key military and political figure, lived on the Gulf Coast until 1722.

By the 1850 census, Harrison County had a population of 3,378 whites, 56 free blacks, and 1,441 slaves. During the antebellum period, the county's agricultural economy was underdeveloped, ranking low in the state for cotton and livestock but was the leading rice producer by 1860. That year, there were 584 foreign-born residents in Harrison County, the third-highest in Mississippi. Slaves constituted 21 percent of the population.

After the Civil War, while not many battles occurred there, Harrison County became a refuge for former Confederates, with Jefferson Davis moving to Beauvoir Plantation in 1877. Post-war, the county's population and agricultural sector remained small, but foreign-born residents, mainly Germans and Irish, made up nearly 7 percent of the population in 1880. Harrison had few farms, but most farmers owned their land; African Americans were 27 percent of the population.

Rapid growth in Harrison County occurred from the late 1800s to 1900, with the population rising to 21,002. As industrial jobs rose, agriculture declined, leading to the introduction of the Biloxi schooner for fishing. By 1900, industrial firms employed 1,577 people. The immigrant population expanded, diversifying into many nationalities engaged in fishing and canning.

Religiously, Harrison County had a mix of denominations, with a significant rise in Catholicism due to new immigrants. The arts, tourism, and gambling became part of the county's charm, with hotels opening in the 1880s to cater to visitors, spurred by railroad expansion and proximity to New Orleans.

George Ohr, known as the Mad Potter of Biloxi, opened Biloxi Art and Novelty Pottery in 1879 and created innovative pottery until 1910. Painter Dusti Bongé was born in Biloxi in 1903, and the author Mary Kimbrough Sinclair spent much of her childhood there. Barq’s Root Beer, invented by Edward Barq in 1898, highlights the area's link to New Orleans.

During the early to mid-1900s, Harrison County saw military developments, like the opening of Beauvoir Plantation as a museum in 1941 and Keesler Field, which attracted many during World War II. By 1930, the population was over 44,000, with a significant number of unemployed due to the Great Depression.

Population growth surged from 1930 to 1960, reaching nearly 120,000, with a mix of immigrant communities, including Vietnamese, who primarily worked in fishing.

Harrison County, in 1960, had a diverse labor force primarily in nonagricultural jobs, with few employed in agriculture. It boasted the second-highest high school graduation rate in Mississippi and the lowest percentage of residents with minimal schooling. The county has a notable civil rights legacy, highlighted by Dr. Gilbert Mason's “wade-in” protests against beach segregation and the establishment of the NAACP chapter.

Prominent figures from the county include poet Natasha Trethewey, astronaut Fred Haise, journalist Robin Roberts, basketball player Mahmoud Abdul-Rauf, and author Jesmyn Ward. The Ohr-O’Keefe Museum of Art, opened in 1992, is a cultural landmark.

Harrison County faced significant devastation from hurricanes Camille in 1969 and Katrina in 2005, impacting its population and economy. As of 2010, the county's population surpassed 187,000, reflecting a 56% increase since 1960, while maintaining a white majority alongside notable Hispanic/Latino and Asian minorities.

== Geography ==
According to the United States Census Bureau, the county has a total area of 976 square miles (2,530 km^{2}), of which 402 square miles (1,040 km^{2}) (41%) are covered by water. The Tchoutacabouffa River has its mouth at Biloxi Bay just north of the city of Biloxi. Gulfport, Mississippi, is the chief port in the state, with access to the Gulf of Mexico through a ship channel. This is the second-largest county in Mississippi by total area.

=== Wildlife ===
A single pond in the county contains the critically endangered dusky gopher frog.

=== Major highways ===
- I-10
- I-110
- US 49
- US 90
- MS 15
- MS 43
- MS 53
- MS 67
- MS 605

=== Adjacent counties and parishes ===
- Stone County (north)
- Jackson County (east)
- Hancock County (west)
- St. Bernard Parish, Louisiana (southwest)

=== National protected areas ===
- De Soto National Forest (part)
- Gulf Islands National Seashore (part)

== Demographics ==
Historical population
Census	Pop.	Note	%±
1850	4,875		—
1860	4,819		−1.1%
1870	5,795		20.3%
1880	7,895		36.2%
1890	12,481		58.1%
1900	21,002		68.3%
1910	34,658		65.0%
1920	32,855		−5.2%
1930	44,143		34.4%
1940	50,799		15.1%
1950	84,073		65.5%
1960	119,489		42.1%
1970	134,582		12.6%
1980	157,665		17.2%
1990	165,365		4.9%
2000	189,601		14.7%
2010	187,105		−1.3%
2020	208,621		11.5%
2025 (est.)	217,136	▲	4.1%
U.S. Decennial Census; 1790-1960 1900-1990; 1990-2000 2010-2020

=== Racial and ethnic composition ===
Harrison County, Mississippi – Racial and ethnic composition Note: the US Census treats Hispanic/Latino as an ethnic category. This table excludes Latinos from the racial categories and assigns them to a separate category. Hispanics/Latinos may be of any race.
Race / Ethnicity (NH = Non-Hispanic)	Pop 1980	Pop 1990	Pop 2000	Pop 2010	Pop 2020	% 1980	% 1990	% 2000	% 2010	% 2020
White alone (NH)	121,982	125,635	136,141	125,741	125,092	77.37%	75.97%	71.80%	67.20%	59.96%
Black or African American alone (NH)	30,129	32,083	39,694	40,975	51,143	19.11%	19.40%	20.94%	21.90%	24.51%
Native American or Alaska Native alone (NH)	375	431	797	719	786	0.24%	0.26%	0.42%	0.38%	0.38%
Asian alone (NH)	1,901	4,199	4,874	5,258	5,913	1.21%	2.54%	2.57%	2.81%	2.83%
Native Hawaiian or Pacific Islander alone (NH)	x	x	151	227	257	x	x	0.08%	0.12%	0.12%
Other race alone (NH)	241	78	222	214	739	0.15%	0.05%	0.12%	0.11%	0.35%
Mixed race or Multiracial (NH)	x	x	2,812	4,034	10,715	x	x	1.48%	2.16%	5.14%
Hispanic or Latino (any race)	3,037	2,939	4,910	9,937	13,976	1.93%	1.78%	2.59%	5.31%	6.70%
Total	157,665	165,365	189,601	187,105	208,621	100.00%	100.00%	100.00%	100.00%	100.00%

=== 2020 census ===
As of the 2020 census, the county had a population of 208,621. The median age was 38.2 years. 23.6% of residents were under the age of 18 and 16.5% of residents were 65 years of age or older. For every 100 females there were 94.7 males, and for every 100 females age 18 and over there were 92.0 males age 18 and over.

The racial makeup of the county was 61.4% White, 24.8% Black or African American, 0.5% American Indian and Alaska Native, 2.9% Asian, 0.1% Native Hawaiian and Pacific Islander, 2.9% from some other race, and 7.4% from two or more races. Hispanic or Latino residents of any race comprised 6.7% of the population.

80.8% of residents lived in urban areas, while 19.2% lived in rural areas.

There were 81,633 households in the county, of which 31.8% had children under the age of 18 living in them. Of all households, 41.7% were married-couple households, 19.4% were households with a male householder and no spouse or partner present, and 31.6% were households with a female householder and no spouse or partner present. About 28.3% of all households were made up of individuals and 11.1% had someone living alone who was 65 years of age or older.

There were 91,554 housing units, of which 10.8% were vacant. Among occupied housing units, 58.5% were owner-occupied and 41.5% were renter-occupied. The homeowner vacancy rate was 2.0% and the rental vacancy rate was 10.1%.

== Corrections system ==
Harrison County has been studied by CNN and other media, which have reported on the beatings of inmates in the Harrison County Jail in Gulfport. Inmate Jessie Lee Williams Jr. died while in custody on February 4, 2006. In 2006 and 2007, six Harrison County Sheriff's Department deputies pleaded guilty to crimes related to the abuse of inmates at the jail. while Sheriff George Payne was in office. Sheriff Melvin Brisolara-R was elected in 2008, for Harrison County.

== Communities ==
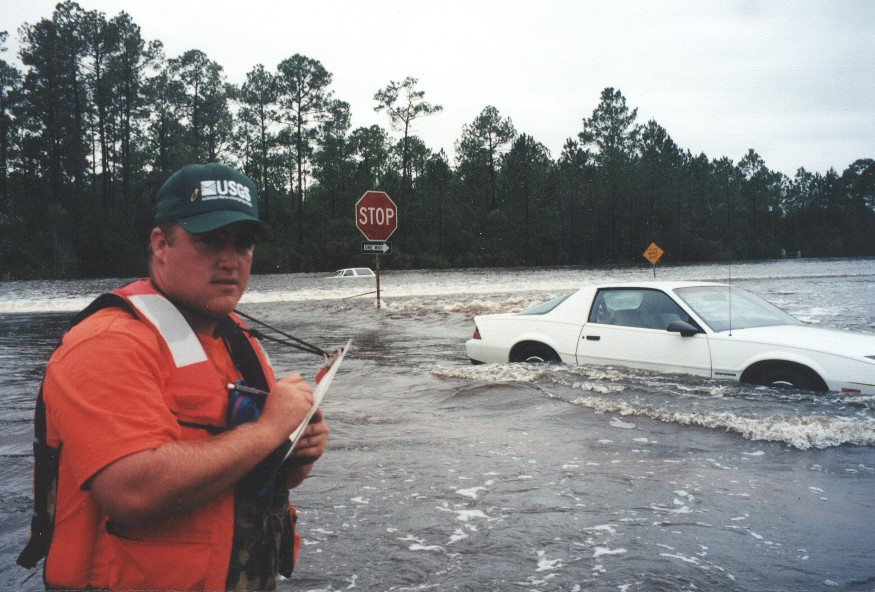
Water from the Tchoutacabouffa River is overflowing its banks near the intersection of Old Hwy 67 and MS 15 on September 29, 1998, after Hurricane Georges made landfall.

=== Cities ===
- Biloxi (county seat)
- D'Iberville
- Gulfport (county seat)
- Long Beach
- Pass Christian

=== Census-designated places ===
- DeLisle
- Henderson Point
- Lyman
- Saucier

=== Unincorporated communities ===
- Cuevas
- Howison
- Lizana
- Mississippi City
- Wool Market

== Politics ==
Harrison County is very conservative for an urban county. Like the rest of Mississippi, the town cast an overwhelming majority for Barry Goldwater in the 1964 election. Since 1964, Harrison County has voted overwhelmingly Republican. The last Democrat to receive over 40% of the vote was Jimmy Carter in 1976, and the last Democrat to win the county was John F. Kennedy in 1960.

United States presidential election results for Harrison County, Mississippi
Year	Republican		Democratic		Third party(ies)	
Year	No.	%	No.	%	No.	%
1912	45	2.82%	1,292	80.95%	259	16.23%
1916	197	11.96%	1,395	84.70%	55	3.34%
1920	314	19.29%	1,270	78.01%	44	2.70%
1924	523	13.99%	3,044	81.41%	172	4.60%
1928	1,485	28.57%	3,712	71.43%	0	0.00%
1932	449	9.72%	4,124	89.28%	46	1.00%
1936	495	10.44%	4,208	88.78%	37	0.78%
1940	633	10.19%	5,577	89.75%	4	0.06%
1944	622	9.43%	5,976	90.57%	0	0.00%
1948	415	5.56%	692	9.28%	6,351	85.16%
1952	5,960	45.35%	7,181	54.65%	0	0.00%
1956	5,742	44.17%	6,549	50.37%	710	5.46%
1960	5,177	30.89%	8,961	53.47%	2,621	15.64%
1964	16,301	75.14%	5,393	24.86%	0	0.00%
1968	6,542	22.37%	4,549	15.55%	18,157	62.08%
1972	28,962	84.02%	4,761	13.81%	747	2.17%
1976	19,207	51.72%	16,569	44.61%	1,363	3.67%
1980	25,175	58.70%	16,318	38.05%	1,395	3.25%
1984	33,995	72.83%	12,495	26.77%	187	0.40%
1988	32,892	68.88%	14,439	30.24%	423	0.89%
1992	25,049	52.84%	15,268	32.21%	7,090	14.96%
1996	25,486	52.84%	18,775	38.92%	3,974	8.24%
2000	32,256	61.30%	19,142	36.38%	1,218	2.31%
2004	39,703	62.75%	23,076	36.47%	488	0.77%
2008	38,757	62.55%	22,673	36.59%	527	0.85%
2012	39,470	62.33%	23,119	36.51%	739	1.17%
2016	40,354	63.74%	21,169	33.44%	1,790	2.83%
2020	46,822	61.80%	27,728	36.60%	1,218	1.61%
2024	48,497	63.88%	26,555	34.98%	871	1.15%

== Education ==
School districts include:

- Biloxi Public School District
- Gulfport School District
- Harrison County School District
- Long Beach School District
- Pass Christian School District

== See also ==
- Friendship Oak (Long Beach, Mississippi)
- Grass Lawn (Gulfport, Mississippi)
- Harrison Experimental Forest
- Historic Grand Hotels on the Mississippi Gulf Coast
- Land Trust for the Mississippi Coastal Plain
- Mississippi Aquarium
- National Register of Historic Places listings in Harrison County, Mississippi
- Old Brick House (Biloxi, Mississippi)
- Tivoli Hotel (Biloxi, Mississippi)
- Turkey Creek Community Historic District
