= Tivoli Hotel (Biloxi, Mississippi) =

- Biloxi’s Tivoli Hotel
- Formerly listed on the U.S. National Register of Historic Places
- Tivoli Hotel 1984

- Location within Mississippi Location within the United States
- Location: 420 Beach Boulevard, Biloxi, Mississippi
- Coordinates: 30°23′38″N 88°52′26″W
- Built: 1926-27
- Architect: Carl E. Matthes
- Architectural style: Second Renaissance Revival
- NRHP reference No.: 84002167

Significant dates
- Added to NRHP: May 18, 1984
- Removed from NRHP: November 5, 2008

The Tivoli Hotel was built in 1926-27 as a 6-story, T-shaped brick building in Second Renaissance Revival architectural style. The hotel was added to the National Register of Historic Places in 1984. In 2005, the structure was badly damaged during Hurricane Katrina and was subsequently demolished.

== History ==
The Tivoli Hotel contained 64 guest rooms in addition to its lobby, dining room, and ballroom. It was considered to be a luxury hotel for its time. During the 1930s, 40s, and 50s, gambling was an accepted form of tourism at hotels along the Mississippi Gulf Coast, and slot machines were available to guests in the Tivoli Hotel lobby.

In the 1950s, the structure was renovated and became the Trade Winds Hotel. With competition from modern-day hotels along the Gulf Coast, the Trade Winds slumped into a state of disrepair in the 1970s and served as an apartment complex for transient guests. By the 1990s, the main hotel building was closed to the public. Although attempts were made by the owner to sell the property, potential developers were not willing to retain the original building in their redevelopment plans.

In 2003, the Mississippi Heritage Trust listed the Tivoli Hotel as one of the ten most endangered landmarks in Mississippi.

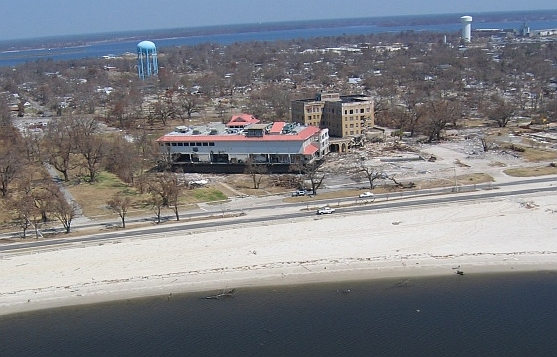
A casino barge (center left) damaged the Tivoli Hotel (center right) during Hurricane Katrina

During August 2005, any plans for saving the Tivoli Hotel were lost when sustained winds of 120 mph (195 km/h) and a 27-foot (8.2 m) tidal surge from Hurricane Katrina pushed a casino barge into the southeast corner of the structure. During the months that followed, plans were formulated by cities, counties, and the State to recover from the hurricane's devastation. As part of those recovery efforts, the Tivoli Hotel property was rezoned for waterfront gaming. In May 2006, the Tivoli Hotel was demolished.

== Redevelopment ==
The site of the former Tivoli Hotel has been proposed to be redeveloped as a new casino hotel. The proposed resort would be called The Mississippi and would feature a casino and 1,300 hotel rooms. The casino would be 100,000 square feet and would feature 2,000 slot machines, 75 table games and a sportsbook. The resort would also include convention space and restaurants. In July 2025, the Mississippi Gaming Commission approved the proposed development.

== See also ==
- Historic Grand Hotels on the Mississippi Gulf Coast
