= Weidel =

Weidel is a surname. Notable people with the surname include:

- Alice Weidel (born 1979), German far-right politician
- Gustaf Weidel (1890–1959), Swedish diplomat and gymnast
- Hans Weidel (1903–1985), German lawyer and military judge
- Hugo Weidel (1849–1899), Austrian chemist
- Johann Weidel (1904–?), Swiss boxer
- Karl Weidel (1923–1997), American politician
