= Wool Market, Mississippi =

- Unincorporated community within Biloxi, Mississippi former census designated place
- Location within Mississippi Location within the United States
- Coordinates: 30°28′04″N 88°59′45″W
- Country: United States
- State: Mississippi
- County: Harrison
- Elevation: 33 ft (10 m)
- Time zone: UTC-6 (Central (CST))
  - Summer (DST): UTC-5 (CDT)
- ZIP code: 39532
- Area code: 228
- GNIS feature ID: 1867334

Wool Market (also Woolmarket) is an unincorporated community in Harrison County, Mississippi. Wool Market is approximately 2.7 miles (4.3 km) northwest of Biloxi and part of the Gulfport-Biloxi metropolitan area.

Historically, the settlement was called "Wool Market", though presently, the one-word "Woolmarket" has been adopted, as can be observed at "Woolmarket Elementary School", and in official documents published by Harrison County government.

A post office operated under the name Wool Market from 1889 to 1911 and under the name Woolmarket Rural Station from 1969 to 1982.

The community was previously listed as a census designated place until it was annexed by the city of Biloxi, Mississippi prior to the 2000 U.S. census.

== Notable person ==
- Sandra Rushing, women's college basketball coach
