= Tchoutacabouffa River =

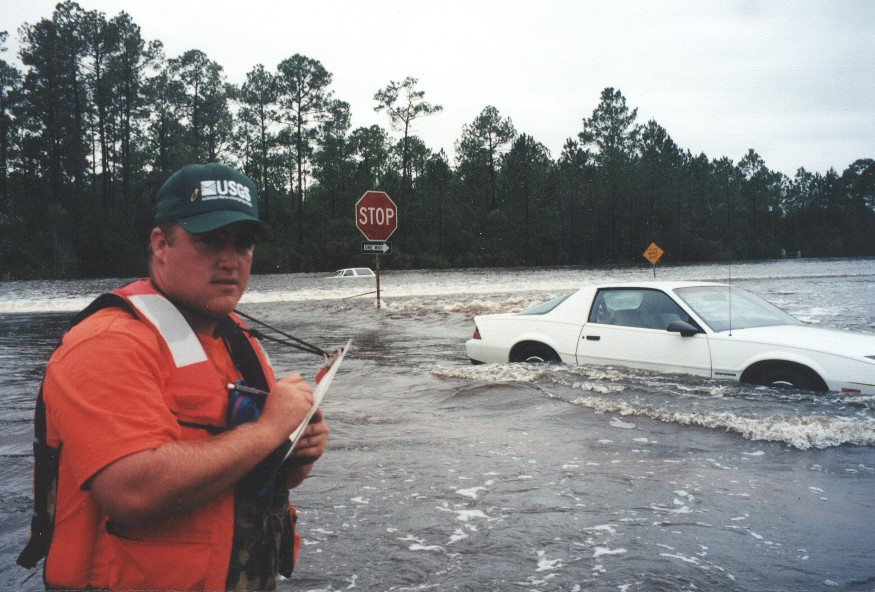

Location
- Country: United States
- State: Mississippi
- District: Harrison County

Physical characteristics
- Source
  - coordinates: 30°36′36″N 88°54′50″W
  - elevation: 0 ft (0 m)
- Mouth: Biloxi Bay
  - coordinates: 30°43′5″N 89°39′22″W
  - elevation: 0 ft (0 m)
- Length: 31 mi (50 km)
- Discharge
  - location: Biloxi Bay

The Tchoutacabouffa River (/ˈtʃutəkəbəf/) is a river located in Harrison County, Mississippi. The river's mouth is located just north of the city of Biloxi at Biloxi Bay and south of present-day Interstate 10. Located at a latitude of 30.435 and longitude of -88.99222, it flows approximately 31 miles (50 km) south from its headwaters.

Tchoutacabouffa is the Biloxi tribe's word for "broken pot." Southern Mississippi art potter George E. Ohr, who worked in the late 19th and early 20th centuries, dug much of the clay he used for his works locally from the Tchoutacabouffa River.

In 2000, the U.S. Geological Survey published the results of a two-dimensional analysis of flood flows at the State Highway 15/67 crossing of the Tchoutacabouffa River. The U.S. Geological Survey has maintained a record of annual flood peaks at D'Iberville, Miss., since 1998.

== See also ==
- List of rivers of Mississippi
