= Lyman, Mississippi =

- Census-designated place
- Location of Lyman, Mississippi

- Location in the United States
- Coordinates: 30°30′12″N 89°7′30″W
- Country: United States
- State: Mississippi
- County: Harrison

Area
  - Total: 8.07 sq mi (20.91 km^{2})
  - Land: 7.77 sq mi (20.13 km^{2})
  - Water: 0.30 sq mi (0.77 km^{2})
- Elevation: 89 ft (27 m)

Population (2020)
  - Total: 2,372
  - Density: 305.1/sq mi (117.81/km^{2})
- Time zone: UTC-6 (Central (CST))
  - Summer (DST): UTC-5 (CDT)
- FIPS code: 28-42800
- GNIS feature ID: 0693849

Lyman is a census-designated place (CDP) in Harrison County, Mississippi, United States. It is part of the Gulfport–Biloxi Metropolitan Statistical Area. As of the 2020 census, Lyman had a population of 2,372.

== History ==
Lyman was once home to an express mail office, saw mill, and general store.

Lyman is located on the Kansas City Southern Railway. The Gulf Coast Lumber Company and Ingram-Day Lumber Company were both located in Lyman.

A post office operated under the name Lyman from 1901 to 1974.

The United States Fish and Wildlife Service operated a fish hatchery in Lyman until 1973, when the Mississippi Department of Wildlife, Fisheries, and Parks took over operations of the fisheries station.

== Geography ==
Lyman is located at 30°30′12″N 89°7′30″W (30.503222, -89.124894).

According to the United States Census Bureau, the CDP has a total area of 8.1 square miles (20.9 km^{2}), of which 7.8 square miles (20.1 km^{2}) is land and 0.31 square miles (0.8 km^{2}), or 3.69%, is water.

== Demographics ==
Historical population
Census	Pop.	Note	%±
2000	1,081		—
2010	1,277		18.1%
2020	2,372		85.7%
U.S. Decennial Census

=== 2020 census ===
Lyman racial composition
Race	Num.	Perc.
White (non-Hispanic)	1,634	68.89%
Black or African American (non-Hispanic)	404	17.03%
Native American	5	0.21%
Asian	41	1.73%
Other/Mixed	148	6.24%
Hispanic or Latino	140	5.9%

As of the 2020 census, Lyman had a population of 2,372. The median age was 35.8 years. 25.0% of residents were under the age of 18 and 14.0% of residents were 65 years of age or older. For every 100 females there were 99.5 males, and for every 100 females age 18 and over there were 94.7 males age 18 and over.

29.1% of residents lived in urban areas, while 70.9% lived in rural areas.

There were 928 households in Lyman, including 595 families. Of all households, 35.1% had children under the age of 18 living in them, 53.8% were married-couple households, 16.3% were households with a male householder and no spouse or partner present, and 21.2% were households with a female householder and no spouse or partner present. About 22.8% of all households were made up of individuals and 7.1% had someone living alone who was 65 years of age or older.

There were 1,005 housing units, of which 7.7% were vacant. The homeowner vacancy rate was 3.1% and the rental vacancy rate was 7.1%.

=== 2000 census ===
As of the census of 2000, there were 1,081 people, 367 households, and 289 families residing in the CDP. The population density was 135.8 inhabitants per square mile (52.4/km^{2}). There were 413 housing units at an average density of 51.9 per square mile (20.0/km^{2}). The racial makeup of the CDP was 86.22% White, 12.49% African American, 0.56% Native American, 0.28% Asian, and 0.46% from two or more races. Hispanic or Latino of any race were 1.48% of the population.

There were 367 households, out of which 42.0% had children under the age of 18 living with them, 63.5% were married couples living together, 11.7% had a female householder with no husband present, and 21.0% were non-families. 16.6% of all households were made up of individuals, and 5.2% had someone living alone who was 65 years of age or older. The average household size was 2.95 and the average family size was 3.31.

In the CDP, the population was spread out, with 29.5% under the age of 18, 11.7% from 18 to 24, 28.0% from 25 to 44, 23.5% from 45 to 64, and 7.3% who were 65 years of age or older. The median age was 33 years. For every 100 females, there were 97.3 males. For every 100 females age 18 and over, there were 94.9 males.

The median income for a household in the CDP was $41,786, and the median income for a family was $60,714. Males had a median income of $35,114 versus $26,985 for females. The per capita income for the CDP was $19,847. About 3.0% of families and 3.7% of the population were below the poverty line, including 1.7% of those under age 18 and 27.8% of those age 65 or over.

== Education ==
Lyman is served by the Harrison County School District.
