= Saucier, Mississippi =

- Census-designated place
- Location of Saucier, Mississippi

- Location in the United States
- Coordinates: 30°37′30″N 89°8′18″W
- Country: United States
- State: Mississippi
- County: Harrison

Area
  - Total: 7.05 sq mi (18.26 km^{2})
  - Land: 6.94 sq mi (17.98 km^{2})
  - Water: 0.11 sq mi (0.28 km^{2})
- Elevation: 161 ft (49 m)

Population (2020)
  - Total: 1,077
  - Density: 155.2/sq mi (59.92/km^{2})
- Time zone: UTC-6 (Central (CST))
  - Summer (DST): UTC-5 (CDT)
- ZIP code: 39574
- Area code: 228
- FIPS code: 28-65720
- GNIS feature ID: 0694718

Saucier is a census-designated place (CDP) in Harrison County, Mississippi, United States. It is part of the Gulfport–Biloxi Metropolitan Statistical Area. The population was 1,077 at the 2020 census.

== History ==
Originally located on the now-defunct Gulf & Ship Island Railroad, the hamlet established a money order post office and express office in 1893. In 1900, the hamlet had a population of about 110 and had a sawmill, drugstore, confectionery store, and five general stores. In 1906, it had a population of 200.

During World War II, Axis prisoners were held at a prison-of-war camp in Saucier. The camp closed following the war and turned into a recreation area, with only the ruins of an ammunition bunker remaining.

Following the 1954 Brown v. Board of Education decision, Saucier began to implement desegregation 24 years later, one of the last towns to integrate schools. The Ku Klux Klan requested to hold a rally on the grounds of Saucier Elementary but were denied by school board out of concern of inflaming tensions. The Mississippi Civil Liberities Union (the ACLU) joined on behalf of the Klan, who won the lawsuit.

== Geography ==
Saucier is located in central Harrison County, along the Canadian Pacific Kansas City railroad.

According to the United States Census Bureau, the CDP has a total area of 7.1 square miles (18 km^{2}), of which 7.0 square miles (18 km^{2}) is land and 0.1 square miles (0.26 km^{2}) (0.85%) is water.

== Demographics ==
Historical population
Census	Pop.	Note	%±
2000	1,303		—
2010	1,342		3.0%
2020	1,077		−19.7%
U.S. Decennial Census 2010–2020

Saucier was first listed as a census designated place in the 2000 U.S. census.

=== 2020 census ===
Saucier racial composition
Race	Num.	Perc.
White (non-Hispanic)	958	88.95%
Black or African American (non-Hispanic)	9	0.84%
Native American	6	0.56%
Asian	4	0.37%
Other/Mixed	65	6.04%
Hispanic or Latino	35	3.25%

As of the 2020 United States census, there were 1,077 people, 429 households, and 292 families residing in the CDP. The population was 1,342 at the 2010 census.

=== 2000 census ===
As of the 2000 census, there were 1,303 people, 478 households, and 367 families residing in the CDP. The population density was 186.2 inhabitants per square mile (71.9/km^{2}). There were 507 housing units at an average density of 72.4 per square mile (28.0/km^{2}). The racial makeup of the CDP was 97.47% White, 0.69% African American, 0.15% Native American, 0.23% Asian, 0.15% Pacific Islander, 0.15% from other races, and 1.15% from two or more races. Hispanic or Latino of any race were 1.38% of the population.

There were 478 households, out of which 38.3% had children under the age of 18 living with them, 59.8% were married couples living together, 9.6% had a female householder with no husband present, and 23.2% were non-families. 16.1% of all households were made up of individuals, and 5.2% had someone living alone who was 65 years of age or older. The average household size was 2.73 and the average family size was 3.04.

In the CDP, the population was spread out, with 28.5% under the age of 18, 10.0% from 18 to 24, 30.9% from 25 to 44, 23.6% from 45 to 64, and 7.0% who were 65 years of age or older. The median age was 34 years. For every 100 females, there were 103.3 males. For every 100 females age 18 and over, there were 106.0 males.

The median income for a household in the CDP was $37,000, and the median income for a family was $44,167. Males had a median income of $30,099 versus $26,875 for females. The per capita income for the CDP was $15,164. About 21.5% of families and 22.1% of the population were below the poverty line, including 31.2% of those under age 18 and none of those age 65 or over.

== Arts and culture ==
The public library is the Saucier Children's Library. It is a part of the Harrison County Library System.

== Education ==
Saucier is served by both Saucier Elementary School (K-6) and West Wortham Elementary/Middle School (K-8) in the Harrison County School District.

== Media ==
Saucier's newspaper is The Sun Herald, which serves the Gulfport-Biloxi metro area.

== Infrastructure ==
The area is served by a volunteer fire department.

== Notable people ==
- Joe James, racecar driver
- Israel Broussard, actor

== In popular culture ==
In 2004, The Ladykillers, a remake of the original British movie, was set in Saucier, though no filming was done there.
