= Borris =

Borris may refer to:

== Place in Denmark ==
- Borris, Ringkøbing-Skjern Municipality, a small railway town in western Jutland

== Places in Ireland ==
=== County Carlow ===
- Borris, County Carlow, a village

=== County Laois ===
- Borris, County Laois, a civil parish
  - Borris Great, Borris, County Laois, a townland in the above civil parish
  - Borris Little, Borris, County Laois, a townland in the above civil parish
- Borris-in-Ossory, County Laois, a village

=== County Tipperary ===
- Borris, Twomileborris, County Tipperary, a townland
- Borris, Roscrea, County Tipperary, a townland
- Borrisokane, a small town
- Borrisoleigh, a small town
- Borrisleigh, a civil parish
- Borrisoleigh and Ileigh, a Catholic parish
- Two-Mile Borris, a village
  - Twomileborris (electoral division)

== People ==
- Borris Miles (born 1965), American politician
- Jeff Borris (born 1962), baseball agent
- Karl Borris (1916–1981), German ace pilot in WWII
- Ryan Borris (born 1983), Scottish footballer
- Siegfried Borris (1906–1987), German composer, musicologist and music educator

== Other meanings ==
- Borris-Ileigh GAA, a Gaelic games club in County Tipperary, Ireland

== See also ==
- Boris (disambiguation)
