= Boris =

Boris may refer to:

== People ==
- Boris (given name), a male given name
- List of people with given name Boris
- Boris (surname)
- Bobby Pickett (1938–2007), American singer-songwriter and comedian known as Bobby "Boris" Pickett
- Boris, a tribe of the Adi people

== Arts and entertainment ==
- Boris (band), a Japanese experimental rock trio
- Boris (EP), by Yezda Urfa, 1975
- "Boris" (song), by the Melvins, 1991
- Boris (TV series), a 2007–2010, 2022–present Italian comedy series
- Boris: The Film, a 2011 Italian film based on the TV series
- Boris: The Rise of Boris Johnson, a 2006 biography by Andrew Gimson

== Other uses ==
- Boris (crater), a lunar crater
- List of storms named Boris
- SS Boris, the first Bulgarian merchant ship, launched in 1894
- Boris FX, an American-based visual effects, video editing, photography and audio software plug-in developer

== See also ==
- Borris (disambiguation)
- Boris stones, seven medieval artifacts in Belarus
