= Catahoula Creek =

Stream in Mississippi, United States

Catahoula Creek is a stream in the U.S. state of Mississippi. It rises in Pearl River County, flows through Hancock County for about 25 miles where it becomes the Jourdan River flowing into the Bay of St. Louis.

The creek has a Choctaw language name and a large Choctaw town, Center, once stood on its banks. Center was the county seat of Hancock until the expulsion of Native Americans from the South in the 1830s.

Catahoula Creek has frequently been used for scientific studies of fish. Treasure hunters following rumors of buried treasure frequently dig holes in the banks.

== Hydrology ==
Catahoula Creek rises at 71.6 m (235 ft) above sea level (30.7265°N 89.4877°W) in Pearl River County and flows into the Jourdan River, of which it is the main tributary, after a distance of about 25 miles. It changes from being Catahoula Creek to Jourdan River at the point where it joins Bayou Bacon (30.4063°N 89.5005°W) in Hancock County and then flows into the Bay of St. Louis. The creek has a drainage area of 155 square miles (401 km^{2}).

The headwaters have high gradients, 3.8–4.8 m/km (20–25 ft/mile) but becomes much more gentle in the lower reaches. Rainfall in the area is one of the highest in the US at an annual average of 154.2 cm (52.8 in). The high gradient and heavy rainfall can lead to fast-flowing water causing major shifts in the sandy stream bed. This seasonal high flow usually declines after a few days.

== Native American connection ==
Catahoula Creek is a name derived from the Choctaw language. Sources vary whether it means "beloved lake" or "lake people".

=== Center ===
The fork between Catahoula Creek and Playground Branch (about a mile east of the town of Caesar) was the site of the major Choctaw settlement Center. The name is a translation of a Muskhogean word meaning "coming together" or "where everybody meets." Center was founded by the Choctaw chief Muchihira, after he sold his settlement at Picayune in 1800 to Frenchman Steven Jarrell. It was the largest Native American town in South Mississippi with a population of 1,500 in 1815. Center became the first county seat of Hancock County. It gained a courthouse, post office, and many other civic buildings during this period. In 1830, the Choctaw were expelled in the Trail of Tears episode, the county seat was moved to Gainesville, and Center was abandoned.

== Scientific studies ==
Catahoula Creek has been the location of a number of scientific studies

- The creek was the main study area for a 1975 investigation into the ecology of the longnose shiner. The study area also included the mouth of Dead Tiger Creek (30.4080°N 89.5403°W), a tributary of Catahoula Creek.
- A study of naked sand darters running from 1970 to 1976 had the section of Catahoula Creek below Dead Tiger Creek as the main study area. A secondary study area included Hickory Creek, another tributary of Catahoula Creek (joining at 30.4763°N 89.5379°W).
- Multiple studies (in 1975, 1987, and 2000) of the blacktail shiner have been based on a large sample of the fish taken from Catahoula Creek in 1970. The entire sample was taken at the same time and in the same place (below the mouth of Dead Tiger Creek). The reason so many studies have used this sample is that a single, large sample elimates variables introduced by taking smaller samples at different times and places.

== Buried treasure ==
A large sum of money was supposedly buried somewhere along the banks of Catahoula Creek in 1856 or 1857 by the outlaw gang led by James Copeland. The money, said to be contained in three kegs, has never been found and numerous treasure hunters continue to look for it. Many holes exist along the banks of the creek as a result of this activity.

== Bibliography ==
- Baca, Keith A., Native American Place Names in Mississippi, University Press of Mississippi, 2007 ISBN 978-1-60473-483-6.
- Browning, William, "Hunting James Copeland's Lost Treasure", Country Roads Magazine, retrieved and archived 29 March 2020.
- Heins, David C.; Clemmer, Glenn H., ""Ecology, food and feeding of the longnose shiner, Notropis longirostris (Hay), in Mississippi", The American Midland Naturalist, vol. 94, no. 2, pp. 284–295, October 1975.
- Heins, David C.; Rooks, Russell, "Life history of the naked sand darter, Ammocrypta beani, in southeastern Mississippi, pp. 61–70 in, Lindquist, David G.; Page, Lawrence M., Environmental Biology of Darters, Springer Science & Business Media, 1984 ISBN 9061935067.
- Hood, Craig S.; Heins, David C., "Ontogeny and allometry of body shape in the blacktail shiner", Cyprinella venusta", Copeia, vol. 2000, iss. 1, pp. 270–275, January 2000.
- Pecora, William T. (director), Surface Water Supply of the United States 1961–65: Part 2. South Atlantic Slope and Eastern Gulf of Mexico Basins: Volume 3. Basins from Apalachicola River to Pearl River, Washington: United States Government Printing Office, 1970.
- Perrin, Rosemarie D., Explorers Ltd. Guide to Lost Treasure in the United States and Canada, Cameron House, 1977 ISBN 0811720748.
- Thigpen, S. G., Next Door to Heaven, Kingsport Press, 1965 OCLC 7874041, as excerpted in Hancock County Historical Society.
