= Anchor Lake =

Anchor Lake may refer to:

- Anchor Lake (Minnesota)
- Anchor Lake (Mississippi)
