= Tropical Storm Cristina (2026) =

Pacific tropical storm in June 2026

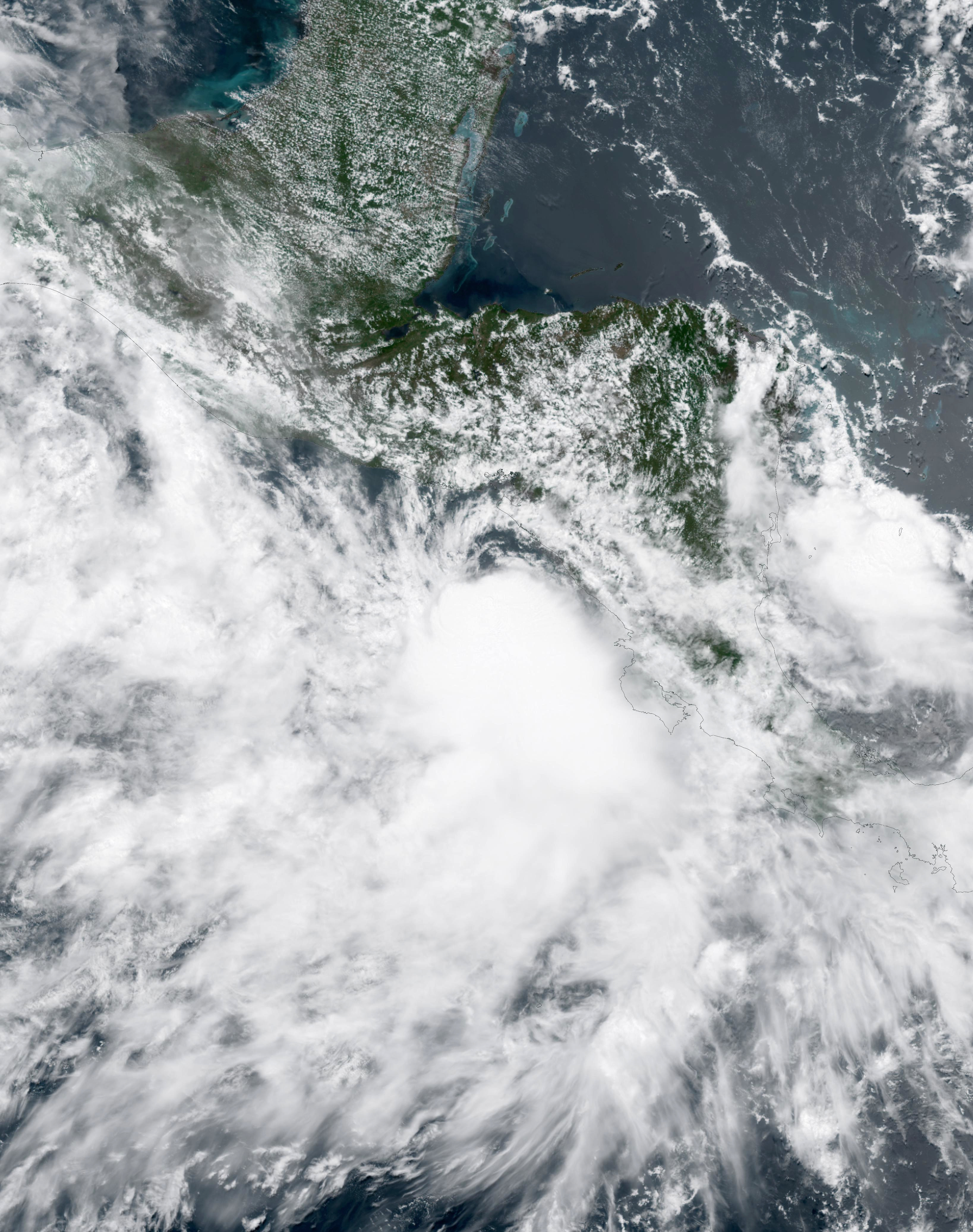
- Cristina just off of the western coast of Nicaragua on June 8

Meteorological history
- Formed: June 8, 2026
- Remnant low: June 10, 2026
- Dissipated: June 11, 2026

Tropical storm
- 1-minute sustained (SSHWS/NWS)
- Highest winds: 50 mph (85 km/h)
- Lowest pressure: 1002 mbar (hPa); 29.59 inHg

Overall effects
- Fatalities: 7
- Missing: 5
- Damage: >$150,000 (2026 USD)
- Areas affected: Central America, Southern Mexico
- Part of the 2026 Pacific hurricane season

Tropical Storm Cristina was a weak tropical cyclone that moved erratically in the far east Pacific Ocean and impacted Central America, most notably El Salvador. The third named storm of the 2026 Pacific hurricane season, Cristina originated as a tropical wave off of Nicaragua and El Salvador on June 7, where it erratically drifted eastward, and came within close proximity to Costa Rica. This precursor disturbance then sharply turned to the north and rapidly developed into a tropical depression. Being present in warm waters, the depression quickly intensified into a tropical storm on June 8. Cristina then stalled off the coast of Central America before slowly turning to the west. On June 10, strong wind shear caused Cristina to weaken to a tropical depression. On June 11, Cristina opened up into a trough and dissipated the next day off the coast of El Salvador.

Heavy rainfall from Cristina caused flash flooding and landslides across Central America. In El Salvador, at least 195 homes were inundated by floodwaters. Seven people were killed by the storm and five others were left missing. Total damage was estimated to be greater than US$150,000.

== Meteorological history ==
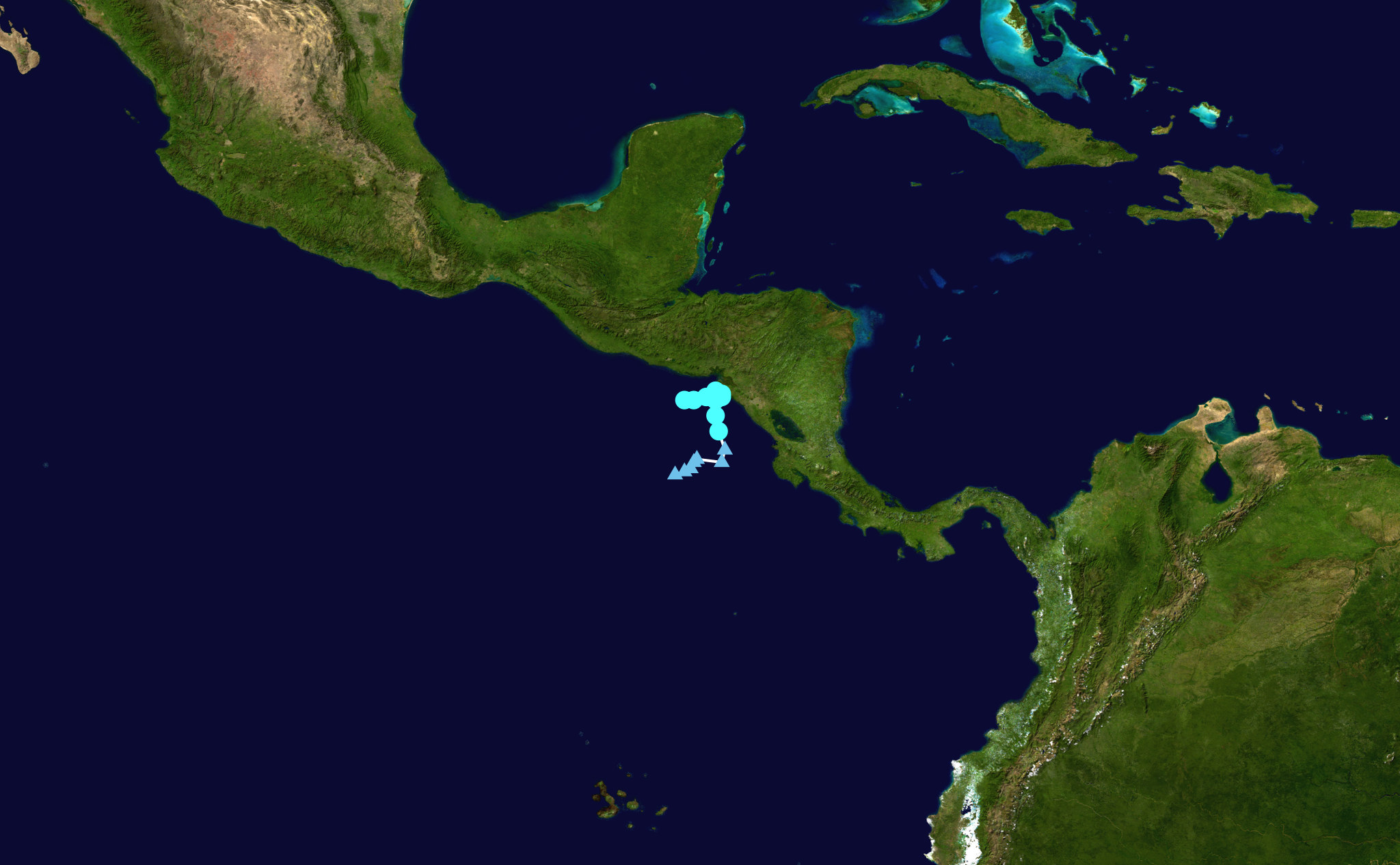
Map plotting the storm's track and intensity, according to the Saffir–Simpson scale Map key Saffir–Simpson scale Tropical depression (≤38 mph, ≤62 km/h) Tropical storm (39–73 mph, 63–118 km/h) Category 1 (74–95 mph, 119–153 km/h) Category 2 (96–110 mph, 154–177 km/h) Category 3 (111–129 mph, 178–208 km/h) Category 4 (130–156 mph, 209–251 km/h) Category 5 (≥157 mph, ≥252 km/h) Unknown Storm type Tropical cyclone Subtropical cyclone Extratropical cyclone, remnant low, tropical disturbance, or monsoon depression

On June 4, the National Hurricane Center noted the possibility of an area of low pressure forming off the western coast of Central America from a monsoon trough. On June 7, deep convection began and organization became increased. On June 8, the circulation became well-defined, making the system a tropical cyclone west of Nicaragua. Cristina became a tropical cyclone farther east than all but three other systems in the East Pacific basin since 1970. (Note: The three East Pacific tropical cyclones that formed farther east than Cristina since 1970 were Francesca in 1970, Miriam in 1988, and Alma in 2008.) Shortly after formation, Cristina reached its peak intensity of 50 miles per hour (80 km/h). Moisture was fed into Central America by Cristina, Tropical Storm Boris to Cristina's west, as well as the Intertropical Convergence Zone. While moving generally northwards due to monsoonal flow, Cristina began disorganizing and weakening due to interactions with the mountains of Central America and wind shear. On June 9, Cristina slowed just offshore of El Salvador and Nicaragua. Slow westward movement would happen later that day. On June 10, Cristina's form became elongated, evolving into a trough. The trough quickly dissipated. Cristina's remnant moisture ended up merging with a tropical wave in the Atlantic, spawning a new disturbance which would later become Tropical Storm Arthur.

== Preparations ==
Tropical storm warnings were issued for the coast from Puerto Sandino to the El Salvador–Guatemala border. Costa Rica issued a green alert for the Atlantic side of the nation and a yellow alert for the Pacific coast and central valley. The Salvadorean civil protection agency issued warnings regarding heavy rains. An orange alert was issued for the nation. A yellow alert was issued in Guatemala.

All classes across all levels were suspended in El Salvador for June 9 and June 10. The nation organized 180 shelters able to house 10,000 people, mostly within the departments of La Libertad, La Unión, San Salvador, and Sonsonate. The Ministry of Education implemented educational services into shelters to prevent disruptions. The Ministry of Health organized hundreds of teams to respond to emergencies during the storm. The port of Acajutla and many national parks in the nation were closed. Beaches were also closed and sailing was restricted due to rough seas. All fishing, recreational and commercial, was also suspended.

Managua cleaned rivers to alleviate possible flooding issues. The Nicaraguan Navy closed ports on the Pacific coast. 2,500 fishermen were unable to go work.

== Impact ==
=== Costa Rica ===
Prior to the storm, Costa Rica's soils were already saturated and the nation was facing a drought. Flooding was reported in Paracito de Moravia and Río Hondes de Siquirres, impacting buildings and roads including National Route 32. Inclement weather created strong rip currents along the nation's coasts. From June 7 to June 8, Instituto Meteorológico Nacional reported some areas had up to 6.7 inches (170 mm) of rain. In Guanacaste, two small boats capsized, leaving five people missing. In Ostional Beach, thousands of olive ridley sea turtle eggs were destroyed by swells and heavy rain. Flooding also forced the evacuation of 32 residents and the opening of three shelters. Nine schools were forced to close due to obstructed roadways.

=== El Salvador ===
The Salvadoran coast was buffeted by strong waves. Puerto de la Libertad suspended operations with reports of damage to the boardwalk. Water from waves also entered many homes. An eighty-year-old woman was rescued off the Salvadoran coast, her boat experiencing rough seas.

In Santa Ana, heavy rains induced flooding that required a driver to be rescued by firefighters. By June 8, Santa Ana had experienced 4.4 inches (113 mm). Throughout the entire nation, Dirianda received the highest amount of rainfall of 6.89 inches (175 mm). Vehicles and buildings in the area suffered damage. Flooding was also reported in La Libertad and Sonsonate Departments. Flooding occurred in several houses in Soyapango after sewage infrastructure failed. In the whole nation, 41 schools were damaged by rains. At least 195 damaged homes, 29 landslides, 156 fallen trees, 112 blocked roadways, 19 damaged vehicles, and two river overflows were reported. In La Libertad, swells damaged an amusement park. Heavy rains from Cristina washed trash into Lake Ilopango. A man was injured in a traffic accident caused by inclement weather. In Acajutla, dozens of homes and businesses were destroyed by swells. Residents and business owners estimated losses at US$150,000.

Evacuations were reported along the coast of El Salvador in response to damages caused by Cristina. Thirty people from Boca Posa were evacuated. Flooding in the Río Palmira also prompeted evacuations. Overall, 95 people including 56 minors went to shelters. Within shelters, 176 instances of medical treatments were undertaken.

=== Nicaragua ===
Heavy rains occurred along the Pacific coast of Nicaragua and into Managua. La Talanguera, in San Juan del Sur, was left without power and communication as rains flooded streets. On Ometepe, winds and rains damaged a power line, causing the island to enter a blackout and a road blockage. In Managua, several roads were damaged by rains from Cristina. Trees were also reported to have fallen in the city. Both Universidad Tecnológica La Salle and the San Nicolás de Tolentino Institute reported walls being damaged, and the former closed classes. Waves along the coast reached 2.7 metres (8.9 ft) and winds reached 23 miles per hour (37 km/h). Some boats were beached after being pushed on shore by the waves. Damage to coastal commercial establishments, including in Corinto, by Cristina's waves was reported. Five fishermen were rescued after they became shipwrecked. In León, a home collapsed.

=== Elsewhere ===
Prior to becoming a tropical depression, Cristina produced heavy rains that caused flooding in San Pedro Sula, Honduras, killing a 60-year old man and disrupting traffic. At least 150 families suffered losses from the storm.

In Guatemala, inclement weather temporarily paused the rebuilding of a substation that had earlier caused a blackout in several communities. Heavy rainfall related to Cristina, combined with the effects of the local rainy season, resulted in five deaths and three injuries in Guatemala; two deaths occurred each in Momostenango and Casillas and a child died in Senahú. 279 homes were damaged by floodwaters. Severe beach erosion was reported, with Iztapa losing more than 3 metres (9.8 ft) of sand.

In Chiapas, heavy rain resulted in flooding that caused damage in across at least half a dozen municipalities. In Huehuetán, a bridge collapsed leaving a at least half a dozen homes isolated. In Pijijiapan, storm surge damaged three restaurants. In Cacahoatán, a man was found dead after being swept away by an overflowing river. Two women were rescued after being swept away by an overflowing river. At least twelve palapas were damaged by swells.

== See also ==
- Other storms named Cristina
- Tropical cyclones in 2026
- Weather of 2026
- 2026 Pacific hurricane season
- Hurricanes in Central America
- 2026 in Central America
