= St. Louis Bay Bridge =

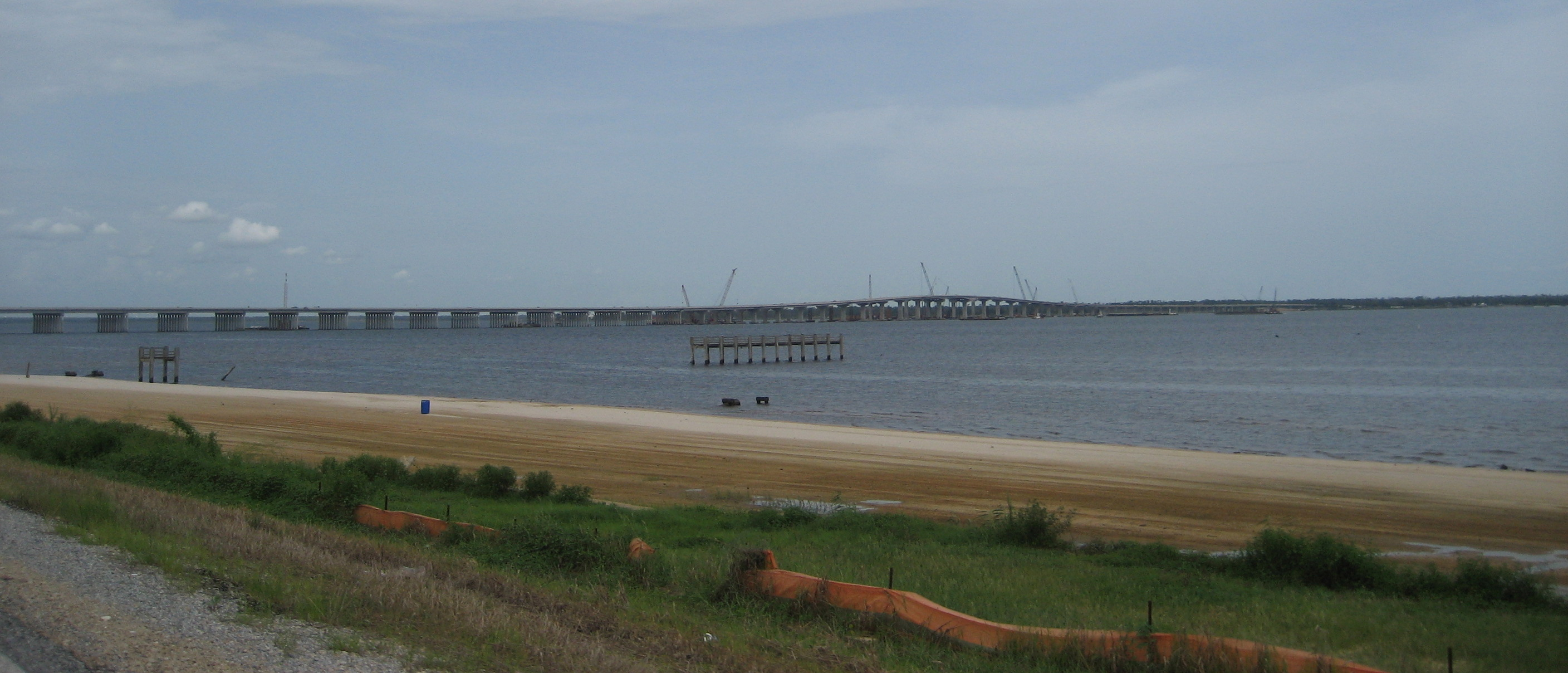
- Coordinates: 30°19′04″N 89°18′15″W
- Carries: 4 lanes of US 90
- Crosses: St. Louis Bay
- Locale: Bay St. Louis and Pass Christian, Mississippi
- Maintained by: MDOT

Characteristics
- Total length: 11,090 ft (3,380.2 m), about 2.1 mi (3.4 km)

History
- Opened: May 17, 2007

Location
- Interactive map of St. Louis Bay Bridge

The St. Louis Bay Bridge is a bridge in the U.S. state of Mississippi which carries U.S. Route 90 over Bay of Saint Louis between Bay St. Louis and Pass Christian. The original bridge was heavily damaged by Hurricane Katrina in August 2005. The new bridge opened to traffic on May 17, 2007. The span carries 4 lanes of traffic as well as a 12-foot (3.7 m) path for pedestrians and bicyclists on the Gulf side of the bridge.

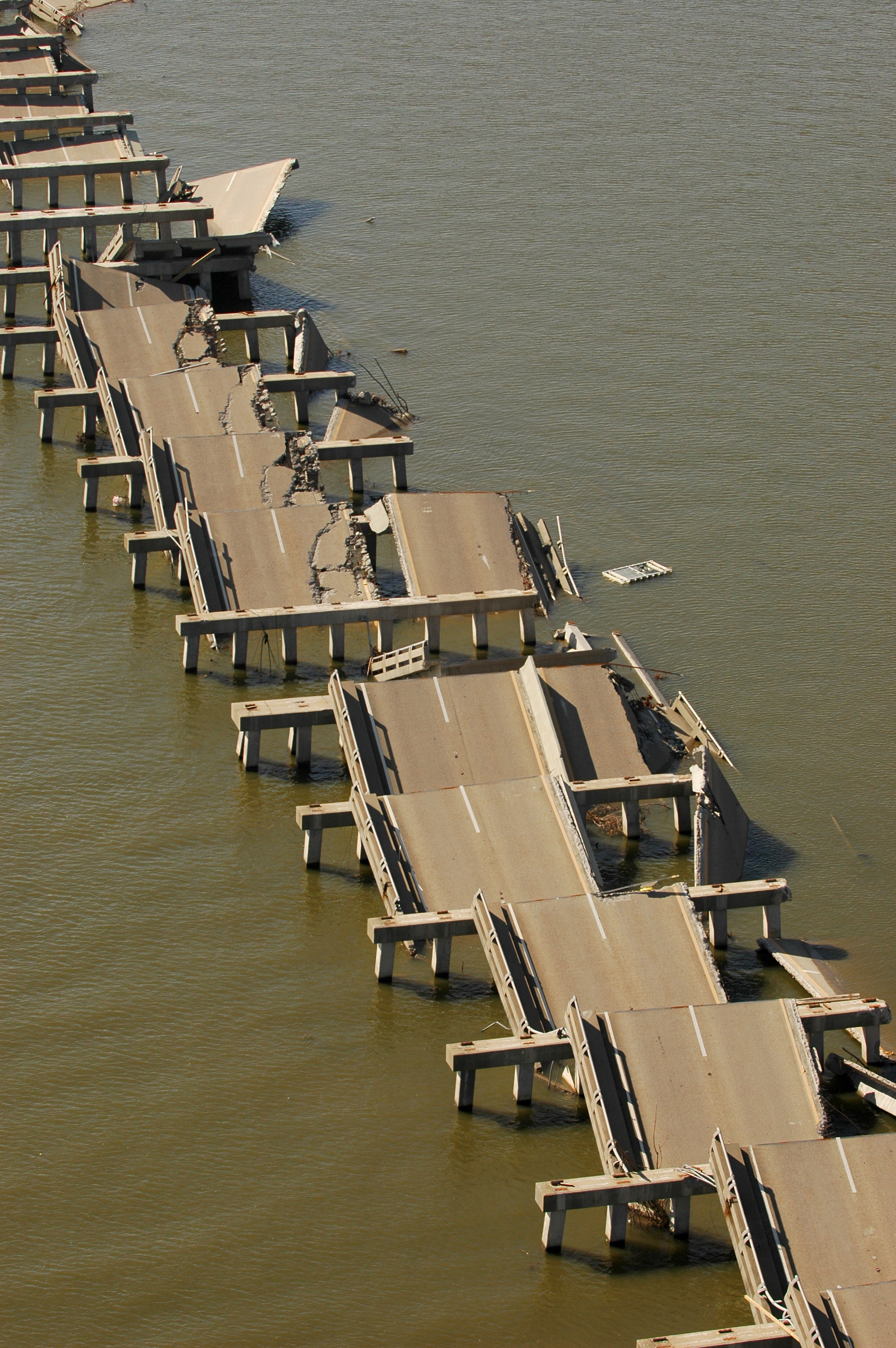
The Bay Bridge on US Highway 90 in 2005, following Hurricane Katrina

The new bay bridge, and the city of Bay St. Louis on the western shore
