= Tropical Storm Arthur (2026) =

Atlantic tropical storm in 2026

- Arthur at peak intensity just off the Texas coast on June 17

Meteorological history
- Formed: June 17, 2026
- Remnant low: June 18, 2026
- Dissipated: June 20, 2026

Tropical storm
- 1-minute sustained (SSHWS/NWS)
- Highest winds: 60 mph (95 km/h)
- Lowest pressure: 999 mbar (hPa); 29.50 inHg

Overall effects
- Fatalities: 3 (2 indirect)
- Damage: $700 million (2026 USD)
- Areas affected: Veracruz; Northern Mexico; Gulf Coast of the United States
- IBTrACS
- Part of the 2026 Atlantic hurricane season

Tropical Storm Arthur was a short-lived and disorganized tropical cyclone that brought significant flash flooding and tornadoes to portions of the Southern United States. The first named storm of the 2026 Atlantic hurricane season, the system’s origins can be tracked back to when a tropical wave combined with the remnants of Tropical Storm Cristina just east of the Yucatán Peninsula. The disturbance was tracked as it made its way into the Gulf of Mexico and eventually into Mexico where it interacted with a frontal boundary. Upon reaching the coast of the US state of Texas, it was labeled as a potential tropical cyclone and eventually a tropical storm becoming named Arthur on June 17. It did not last long due to an ill-defined center and being affected by strong wind shear, degenerating into a post-tropical cyclone near Galveston. The remnant low crossed over the Southeastern United States before being absorbed by a frontal boundary just off the coast of the Carolinas.

Three people were confirmed to have been killed as a result of Arthur. Total monetary losses are approximately $700 million (2026 USD). Rains as strong as those from Arthur are estimated to have a 1-in-1,000-year return period.

== Meteorological history ==
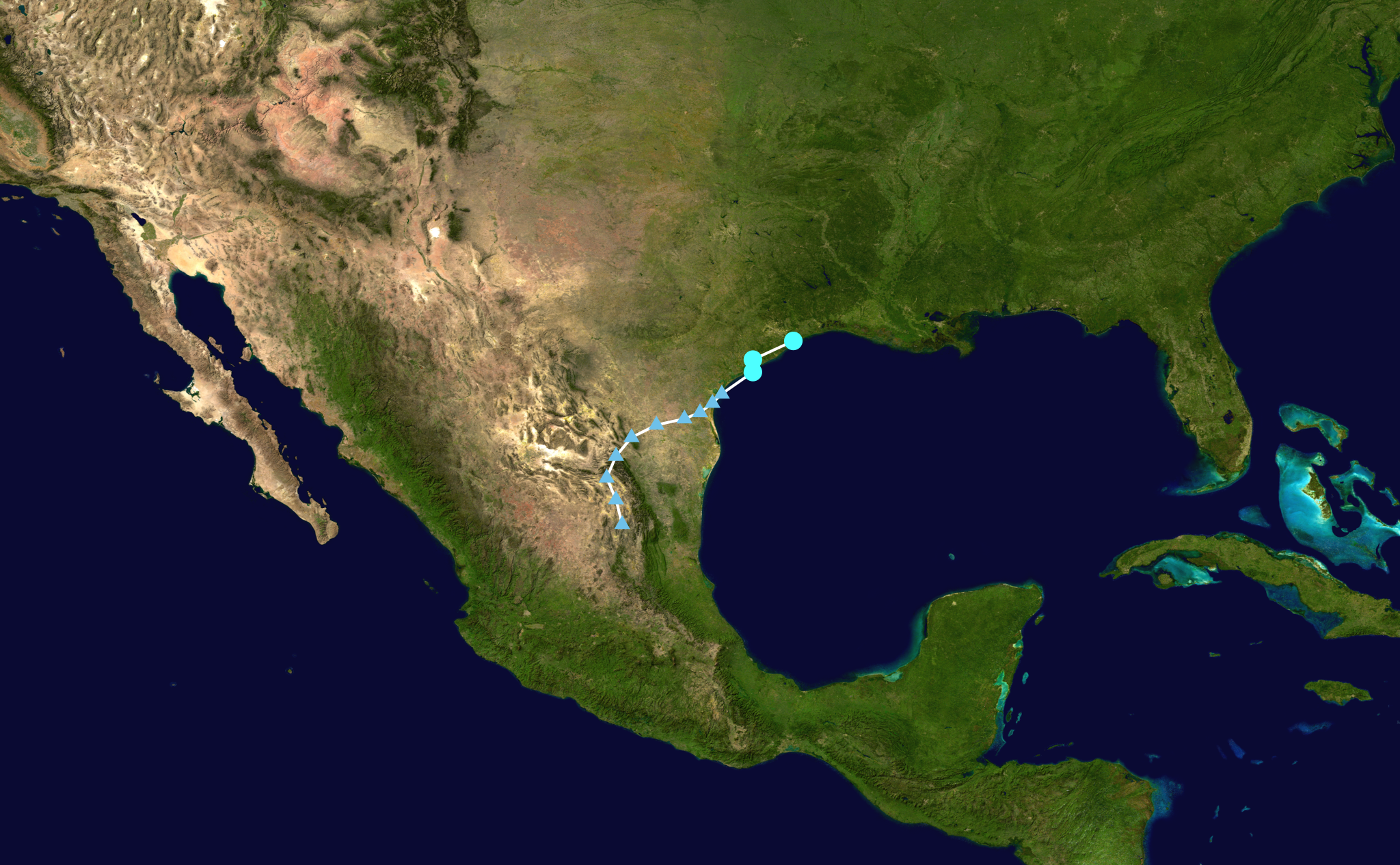
Map plotting the storm's track and intensity, according to the Saffir–Simpson scale Map key Saffir–Simpson scale Tropical depression (≤38 mph, ≤62 km/h) Tropical storm (39–73 mph, 63–118 km/h) Category 1 (74–95 mph, 119–153 km/h) Category 2 (96–110 mph, 154–177 km/h) Category 3 (111–129 mph, 178–208 km/h) Category 4 (130–156 mph, 209–251 km/h) Category 5 (≥157 mph, ≥252 km/h) Unknown Storm type Tropical cyclone Subtropical cyclone Extratropical cyclone, remnant low, tropical disturbance, or monsoon depression

The formation of Tropical Storm Arthur was influenced by the interaction of several proceeding systems. Either in late May or early June, a tropical wave moved off of western Africa. Progressing westward, the wave moved north of a monsoon trough in the Pacific Ocean. As the wave moved into the Gulf of Mexico, Tropical Storm Cristina—found within the monsoon trough—moved northward onto Central America, trailing the tropical wave. The wave and the remnant moisture of Cristina would be absorbed into a low-pressure system that formed on June 12. The low would then move over Mexico on June 14. While over Mexico, the system was steered northeastward by a large trough over the United States. The disturbance was designated as a potential tropical cyclone while located over southern Texas at 15:00 UTC on June 16, producing widespread convection but lacking a well-defined center. Development of the storm was enabled with sea surface temperatures above 83.5 °F (28.6 °C) off the Texas coast. The following day by June 17 at 12:00 UTC, the system became Tropical Storm Arthur after moving off the coast with convective organization proving sufficient for classification. Three hours later, Arthur's winds maxed out at 60 miles per hour (97 km/h) and a minimum pressure of 1,001 mb (29.6 inHg).

Tropical Storm Arthur with multiple vorticity centers along the Texas coast on June 17. One vorticity center (left) can be seen over Matagorda, while another (right) forms near Galveston.

Arthur was poorly organized, under a hostile environment of strong westerly wind shear, most of Arthur’s deep convection remained displaced from the center of circulation. The center of circulation was made up of several vortexes orbiting around a mean center. One of the vorticity centers made landfall at 16:30 UTC based on reconnaissance data and surface observations. Later that same day, the NHC had analyzed that Arthur had weakened some as it began to undergo a center relocation as the old circulation went on to make landfall near Matagorda County, Texas, with a new center reforming near Galveston, Texas, driven by an offshore convective burst at 00:00 UTC on June 18. This was later reassessed to be another vorticity center, which bottomed out at 999 mb (29.5 inHg), although by then, sustained winds had decreased to 40 miles per hour (64 km/h). Increasing shear caused the convection to dissipate as the center became increasingly ill-defined. As a result, Arthur was deemed a post-tropical cyclone as it was located northeast of Galveston inland at 06:00 UTC. The NHC continued to track the remnants of Arthur for possible redevelopment off the US East Coast as the storm trekked northeastward. The next day, strong upper-level wind shear and Arthur’s merging with a nearby frontal system inhibited the chances for possible redevelopment as it was located off the coast of the Carolinas.

== Preparations ==
The precursor disturbance to Arthur bringing heavy rainfall to Texas.

Tropical storm watches were issued from Sargent, Texas, to Morgan City, Louisiana, on June 16 upon designation as a potential tropical cyclone. This was later upgraded to a tropical storm warning between Sabine Pass and Morgan City. The following day, the tropical storm warning was extended to Sargent. Flood watches were issued at least 16 million people from South Texas to Central Mississippi. After Arthur developed, Flood Watches were extended further east to South Georgia. On June 18, a rare high risk of excessive rainfall was issued across the central Gulf Coast.

Greg Abbott, governor of Texas, issued a state of emergency for 101 counties and ordered the Texas Division of Emergency Management to increase 24-hour operations and activate resources. Sandbag distributions were organized across Texas. In Houston, festivals for the 2026 FIFA World Cup were cancelled for June 15 and shortened on June 16. Despite the storm, a World Cup match between Portugal and the Democratic Republic of the Congo scheduled for June 17 was not cancelled because the stadium had a covered roof. This was the first World Cup game to be played in the vicinity of a tropical cyclone. Several school districts across Texas halted programs and activities during the passage of the storm. Texas A&M University–Corpus Christi moved work and classes online while the Kingsville campus delayed opening till 10:00 CDT, both on June 16.

Several parishes in Louisiana distributed sandbags in anticipation of the storm. Evacuations were required in parts of Southeast Louisiana as several creeks were expected to overflow their banks. Residents in part of the New Orleans metropolitan area was asked to stay clear of bodies of water. Pumping stations and drainage systems were cleared to prepare for heavy rainfall, while additional pumping equipment was brought to assist stations that were offline.

A senior center in Wiggins, Mississippi opened as a shelter. Those around the Jourdan River were urged to evacuate before the water levels crested. Double red flags were flown on beaches in Baldwin County, Alabama. Mobile County closed county offices. Bishop State Community College closed all campuses, partially for Juneteenth. Officials in Santa Rosa County, Florida, offered free sandbag filling at four stations.

== Impact ==
=== Mexico ===
Plan DN-III-E was activated.

In Veracruz, damage was reported in 13 municipalities, including damage to 84 homes. Dozens of landslides occurred across the state. Coxquihui had the most reported damaged homes as a result of flooding in the Arroyo Cocinero. Over 100 mm (3.9 in) of rain fell in Xalapa. Damage occurred on a bridge in Espinal. Teams were deployed in Xalapa and Veracruz to aid with clean up efforts.

In Coahuila, flooding caused road closures, including Fed. 29 in Morelos and Zaragoza. In some parts of the state, over five inches (130 mm) of rain fell in two hours. There were river floods affecting Piedras Negras and eight inches (200 mm) of rain fell. Pumping equipment was placed in Piedras Negras to drain out floodwater. Two meal centers and a shelter were opened for those affected by the rains. One person died in Piedras Negras. The Rio Grande (Río Bravo) in Coahuila exceeded 3.5 m (11 ft) in some locations.

In Tamaulipas, between 70% and 80% of roads in Ciudad Victoria were damaged by heavy rains according to the mayor of the city. Support teams were formed to clean the city after the storm. Heavy rainfall worsened a sewage leakage in Tampico.

=== United States ===
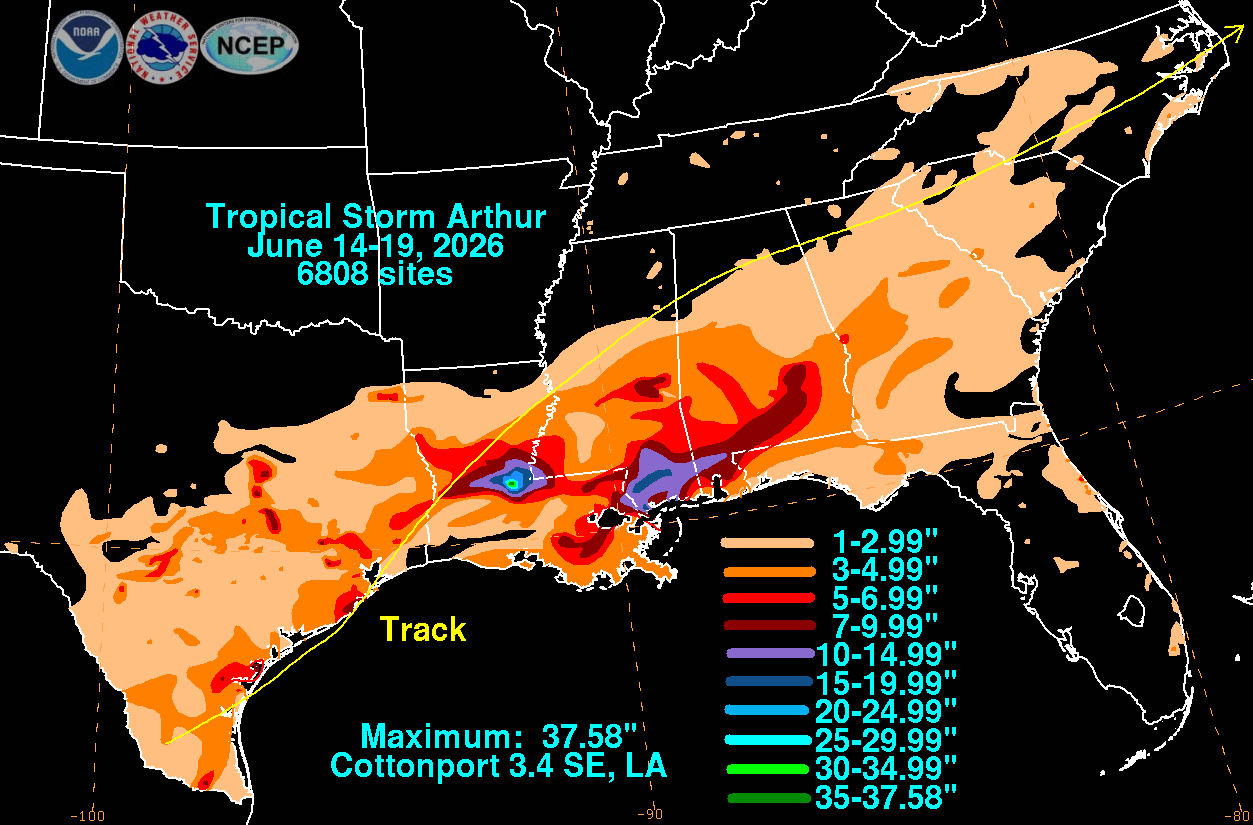
Rainfall map with Arthur in the USA.

==== Texas ====
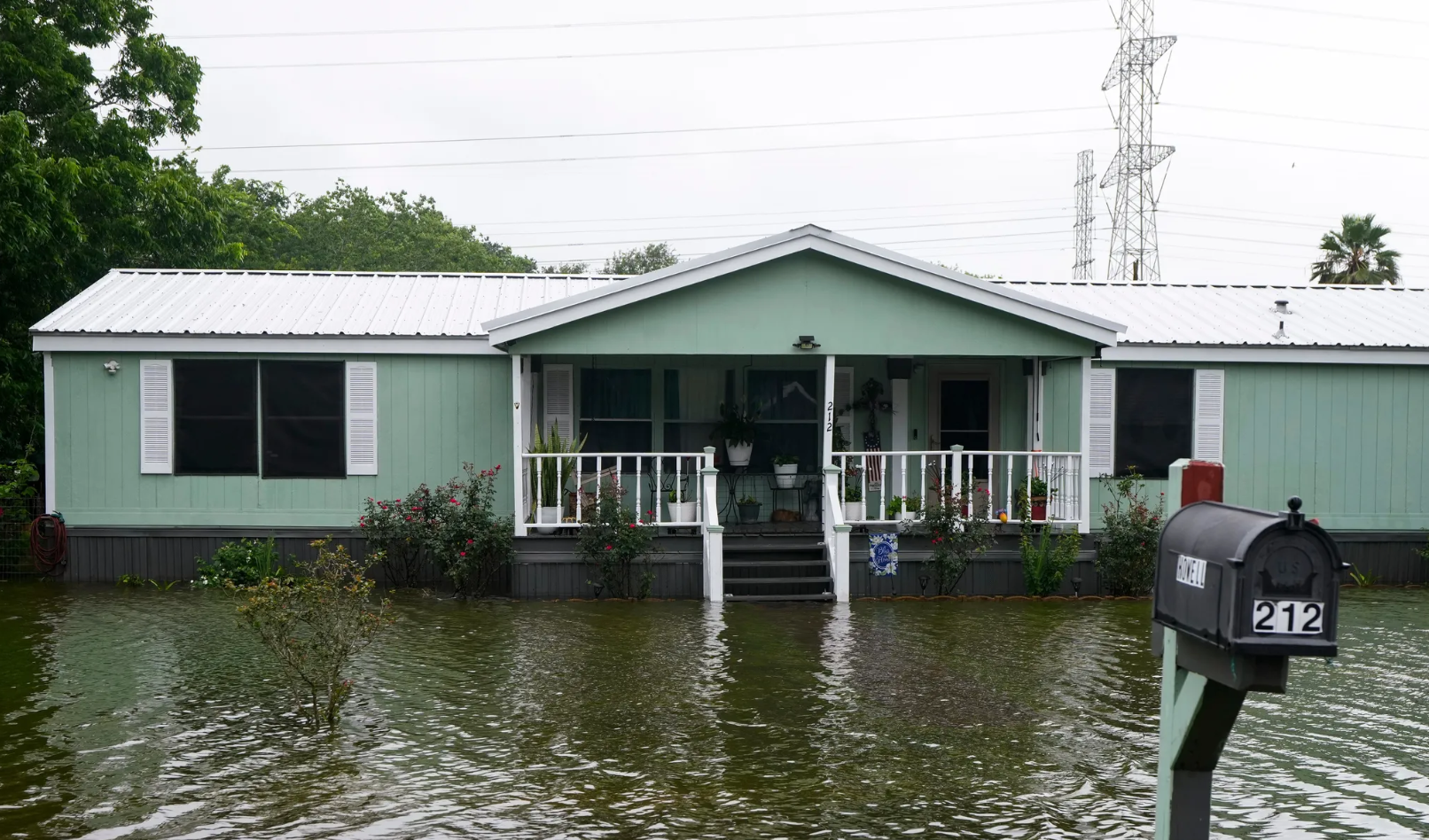
Flooding in Brazoria County, Texas, due to Arthur.

Flash flooding occurred across Texas due to Arthur and its precursor. In Central Texas, dozens of roads were closed to flooding. The city of Waco recorded 2.72 inches (69 mm) of rain on June 14. Flooding stalled several vehicles on I-35 near Robinson and on roadways in Hewitt. An RV Park had to be evacuated due to flooding while emergency responders rescued an individual who had climbed a tree to escape floodwaters near Midway High School. At least 20 people were rescued from floodwaters in Waco. A county road in Milam County was washed out. The Barton Springs Pool was closed due to flooding in Austin. Over 100 low-water crossings were closed across the Austin area. A water rescue occurred in South Austin as a driver attempted to navigate a blocked crossing and was swept away by floodwaters. Camp Mabry set a daily rainfall record for June 15, measuring 3 inches (76 mm) of rain within a few hours, surpassing the previous record set in 1964. Other rain gauges along the Colorado River reported rainfall amounts up to 4.5 in (110 mm) and a floodgate at Tom Miller Dam was released. Waymo temporarily suspended operations in Austin amidst flooding. Rainfall at San Antonio International Airport on June 15 reached 2.6 in (66 mm), beating the daily record of 1.68 in (43 mm) set on June 15, 1894. Rainfall up to 6 in (150 mm) caused widespread flooding across Kendall County. Several roads were flooded across the area, and some water crossings had to be closed for several days for damage inspections. Flooding also occurred in Kerr County, though less significant than flooding that occurred along the Guadalupe River the previous year.

On June 15, Weslaco received 6 in (150 mm) of rain causing floodwaters to enter homes. Due to roads being flooded, Sinton Independent School District halted summer school, testing, and food distribution. At one point, over 9,000 customers reported power outages in South Texas. Additional power outages affecting roughly 2,000 customers each occurred in Galveston and in the Texas City—La Marque areas. Heavy rainfall affected Brazoria County, accumulating to over 8 in (200 mm) in parts of Freeport and Clute. However, the worst of the flooding was avoided due to water levels in drainage systems being lowered before the storm. Two occupants were rescued from a vehicle that became stranded in rising floodwater in Freeport. As a result of heavy rainfall from Arthur and previous storms, the San Jacinto River Authority released water from Lake Conroe to prevent flooding. The storm's impact bypassed much of Houston but the city received several inches of rain, and portions of I-10 near the city closed.

One person was killed due to floodwaters in Bandera. Another drowned in a flooded retention pond near Houston.

==== Louisiana ====
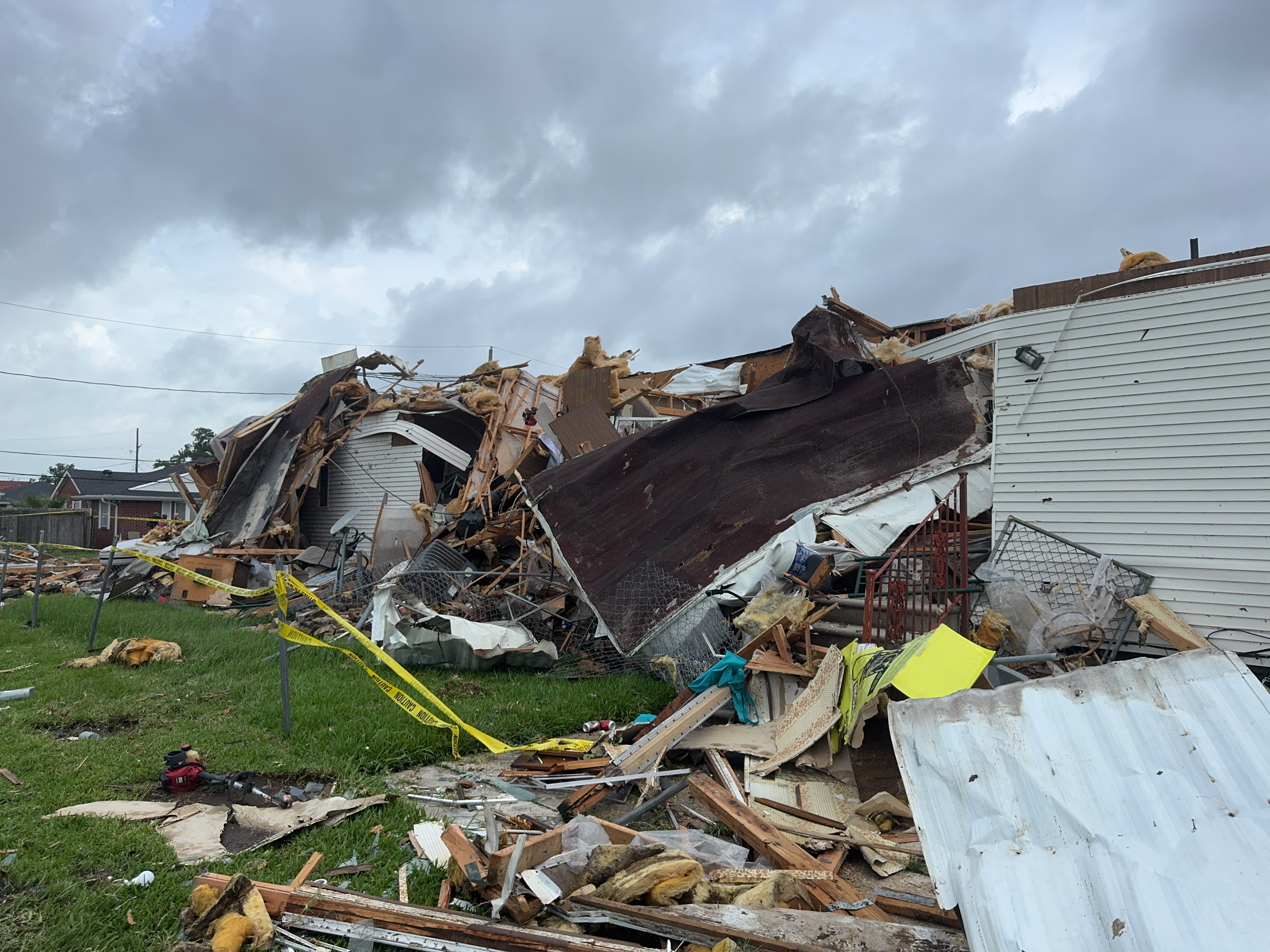
Damage to a manufactured home from an EF1 tornado in Avondale.

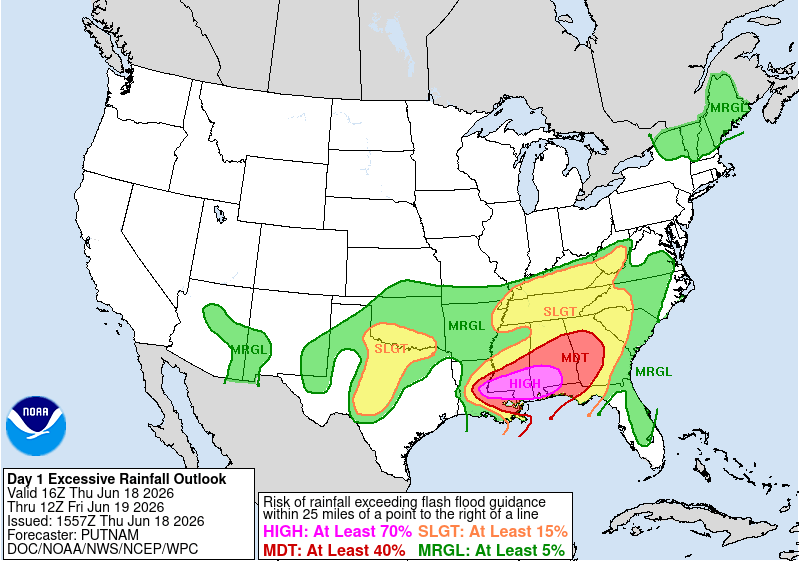
A rare high risk of excessive rainfall as a result of widespread significant flash flooding associated with Arthur.

Rainfall totals in Louisiana peaked at 29.06 inches (738 mm) in Cottonport, making it the most rainfall recorded in the state during a 24-hour period, surpassing the record set by a tropical depression in 1962. The Tchefuncte River overflowed, impacting surrounding buildings in St. Tammany Parish and leading to evacuations and water rescues. Plaucheville was left stranded due to floodwaters and water infiltrated homes. Several water pumps and drainage pumps went offline in New Orleans during the storm from a power dip that the frequency converters were too sensitive to handle. Two people were injured in the western part of Avondale when an EF1 tornado rolled an unanchored mobile home into another mobile home. Another EF1 tornado struck the northern part of New Orleans, damaging trees and buildings. Across the state, there were 14 confirmed tornadoes, including one that tracked into Mississippi; seven of them were rated EF1, while the other seven were rated EF0. Around 39,520 residents were left without power across the state. A 12-car train derailment was reported. Downed trees and power lines on the tracks also forced Amtrak to run a bus bridge for its Mardi Gras Service between New Orleans and Bay St. Louis, Mississippi on June 18. The same day, Amtrak's Crescent was also forced to use bus transportation between New Orleans and Birmingham, Alabama and the northbound City of New Orleans was also delayed departing departing New Orleans due to downed trees and power lines. A new power complex for drainage in New Orleans fell offline after a voltage drop. In Kenner, 50 to 70 stranded vehicles were reported. In Slidell, an eighteen wheeler flipped over. At least 200 homes in Avoyelles Parish were flooded. Many farms were damaged as well in the parish.

==== Elsewhere ====
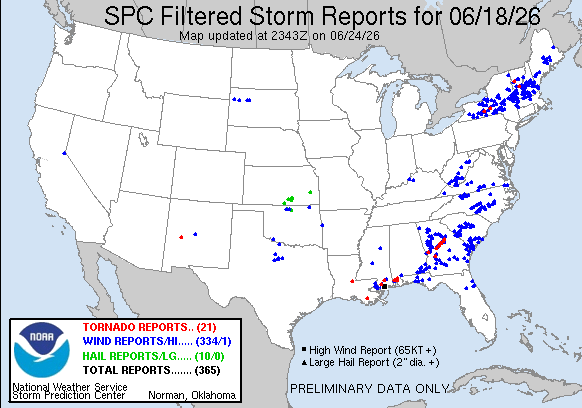
SPC Storm Reports (2026-06-18 1200 UTC – 2026-06-19 1159 UTC) showing damage by wind (blue), large hail (green) and tornado (red).

On I-59 in Mississippi, rain from the predecessor to Arthur left the highway submerged in over one foot (0.30 m) of water. Many other major roads were closed in Pearl River and Hancock Counties. A road worker died working on clean up efforts after Arthur in Franklin County. A dam on Anchor Lake presented a threat of failing, prompting the evacuation of 30 homes. Officials drained the lake to reduce strain on the dam's systems. The Jourdan River overflowed its banks near Kiln, went into homes, and blocked MS 603. The Biloxi River rose 30 feet (9.1 m) above typical levels. Approximately 38 people were rescued from floodwaters. The governor of the state, Tate Reeves, declared a state of emergency for impacted areas. Later, Reeves would request a presidential disaster declaration for eight counties in his state. Four EF1 tornadoes were confirmed across the state; an additional EF1 tornado tracked into the state out of Louisiana. More than 500 homes reported damage in Mississippi, the majority in Harrison County. Further, seventeen businesses and five farms also reported damage.

SR 198 partially closed to flash flooding. Over 20,000 customers lost power in Alabama, primarily in Mobile County. Five weak tornadoes were confirmed in the state.

Around 100 customers in Escambia County, Florida, lost power. Based on radar measurements, 4–8 inches (100–200 mm) fell across the Florida Panhandle. This rainfall partially alleviated drought conditions in the region.

Over 4,800 people lost power due to the storms in Georgia, and several fan festivals for the 2026 FIFA World Cup were also cancelled. A ground stop was also issued for Hartsfield-Jackson Atlanta International Airport. Ten weak tornadoes were confirmed in Central Georgia.

Over 2,000 people lost power in Brunswick County, North Carolina.

== Aftermath ==
After reviewing the damage, the governor of Louisiana, Jeff Landry, declared a state of emergency for several parishes in the state. He also requested for a presidential disaster declaration for aid towards six parishes. After Donald Trump approved the declaration on July 2, the Small Business Administration offered loans to affected regions. Those receiving aid from the Supplemental Nutrition Assistance Program were temporarily permitted to use aid for hot and prepared food. The head of Pointe Coupee Parish's homeland security claimed that the extended time to approve the declaration was difficult for its citizens. The Sewage and Water Board of New Orleans modernized one of their power stations after Arthur. The Department of Agriculture made available funds for farms impacted by Arthur. The Food and Drug Administration issued warnings to avoid eating foods exposed to flood waters spurred by the storm. Many evacuees from the storm were put into several hotels for months, moving between hotels until they could return home.

== See also ==
- Other storms named Arthur
- Tropical cyclones in 2026
- Weather of 2026
- List of Texas hurricanes
- List of Mexico hurricanes
