= Burgage =

Medieval land term; a town rental property

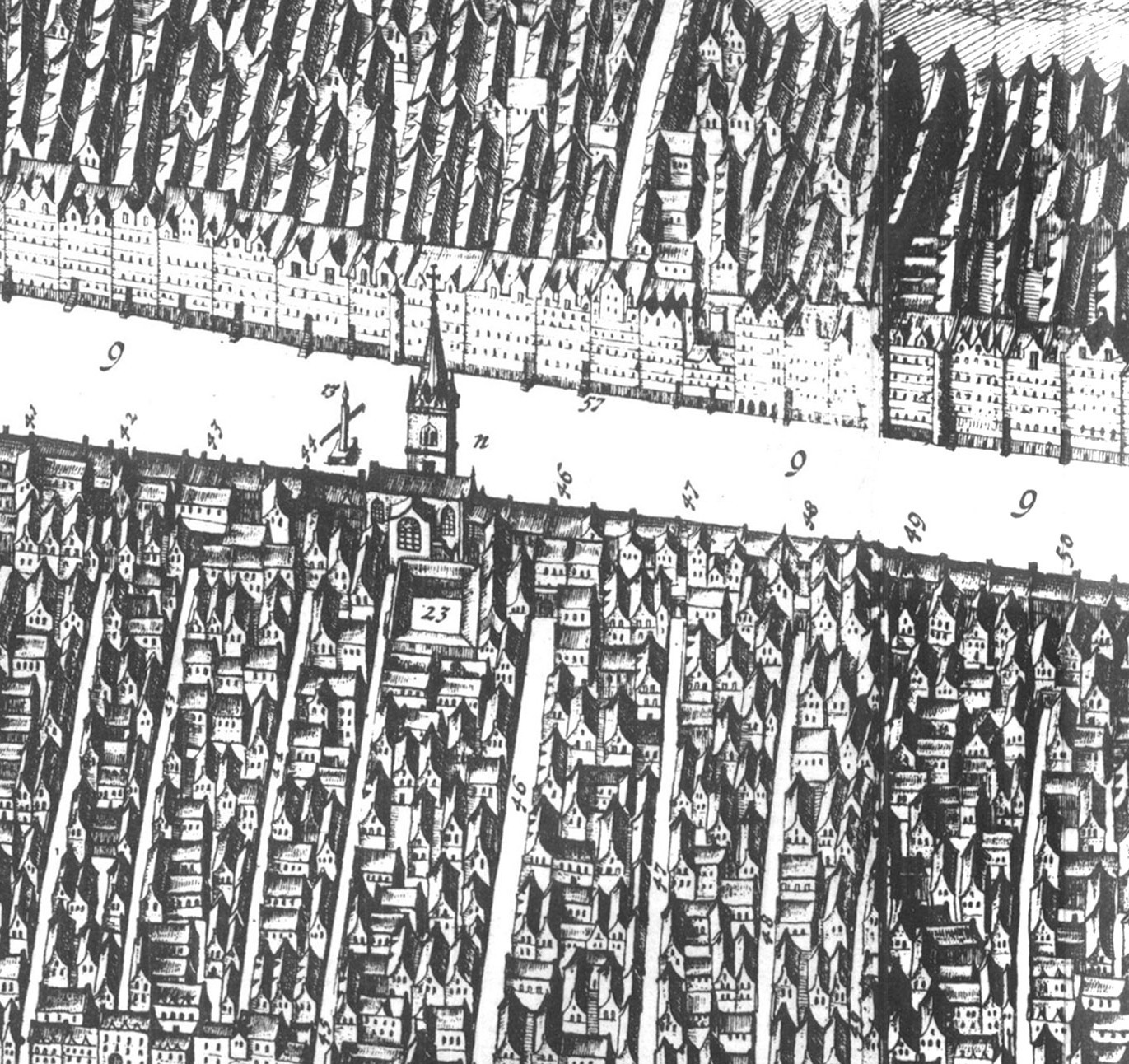
The closes (passageways) off Edinburgh's Royal Mile follow the lines of the old burgage plots

Burgage is a medieval land term used in Great Britain and Ireland, well established by the 13th century.

A burgage was a town ("borough" or "burgh") rental property (to use modern terms), owned by a king or lord. The property ("burgage tenement") usually, and distinctly, consisted of a house on a long and narrow plot of land (Scots: toft), with a narrow street frontage. Rental payment ("tenure") was usually in the form of money, but each "burgage tenure" arrangement was unique and could include services.

As populations grew, "burgage plots" could be split into smaller additional units. Amalgamation was uncommon until the second half of the 19th century.

Burgage tenures were usually money-based, in contrast with rural tenures, which were usually services-based. In Saxon times the rent was called a landgable or hawgable.

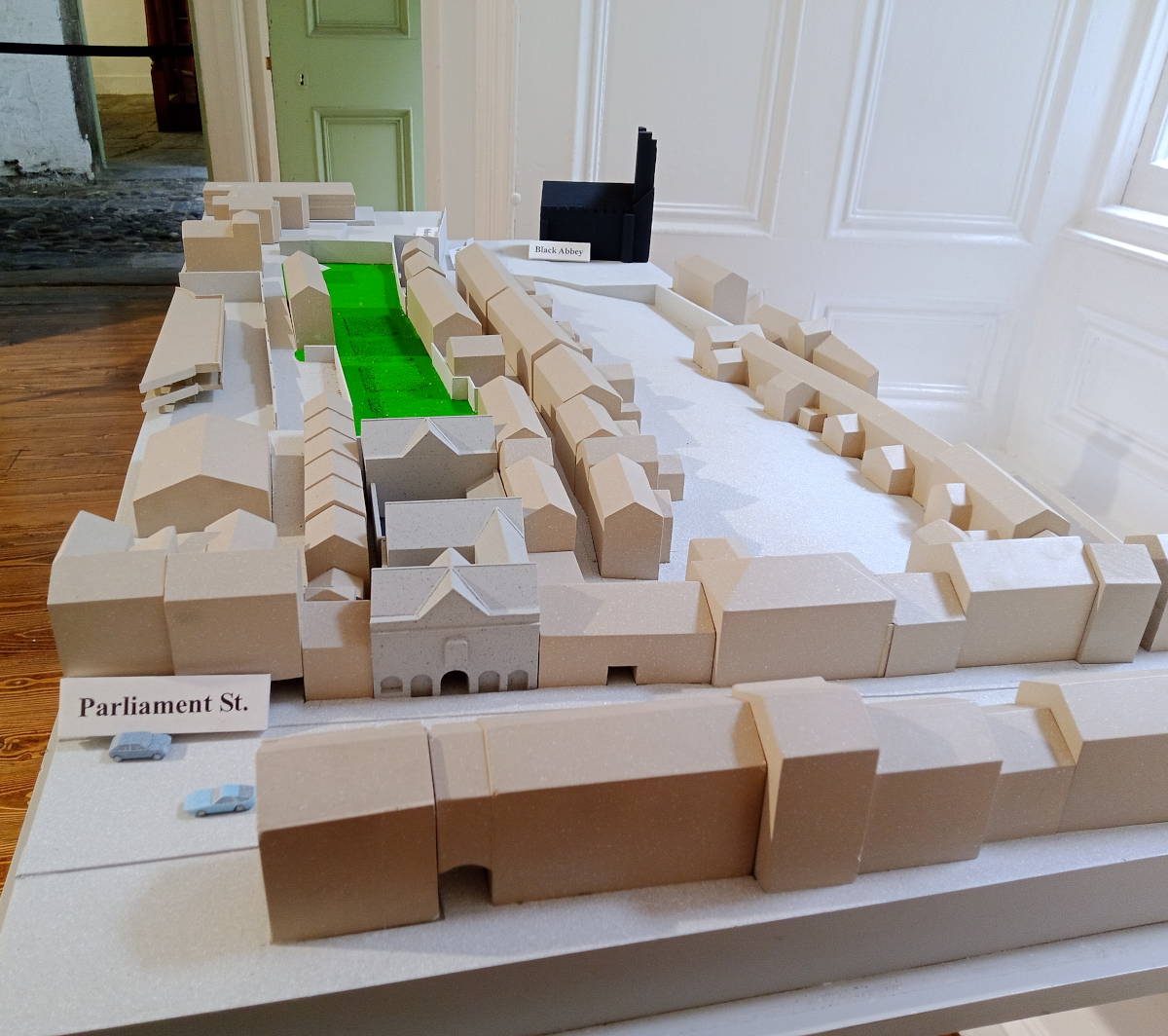
Model of Rothe House and modern surroundings illustrating its burgage plot, with buildings in grey and garden in green

Burgage grants were also common in Ireland; for example, when the town of Wexford received its royal charter in 1418, English settlers were encouraged into the town and were given burgage plots at a rent of one shilling per year. The term was translated into Irish as buiríos, and the element "Borris" survives in many Irish place names. Rothe House in Kilkenny is an exceptionally well-preserved medieval burgage.

== See also ==
- History of English land law
- Land tenure
- Grid plan
- Feudalism
