= Borris, County Laois =

Civil parish in County Laois, Ireland

Borris is a civil parish in the barony of Maryborough East in County Leix.

Its 24 townlands are:

- Aghnaharna (also called Summerhill)
- Ballytegan
- Beladd
- Borris Great
- Borris Little
- Clonminan
- Clonreher
- Clonsoghey
- Cooltoran
- Curriersbog
- Downs
- Gorteen
- Knockmay
- Knocknagroagh
- Kyleclonhobert
- Kylekiproe
- Kyletalesha
- Maryborough
- Meelick
- Moneyballytyrrell
- Ratheven
- Rathnamanagh
- Rossleaghan
- Summerhill—see Aghnaharna
- Togher
