= Lucien M. Gex =

American politician (1907–1971)

Member of the Mississippi House of Representatives from the Hancock County district
- In office January 1936 – January 1940

Personal details
- Born: September 24, 1907 Bay St. Louis, Mississippi, U.S.
- Died: October 6, 1971 (aged 64) Bay St. Louis, Mississippi, U.S.

Lucien Marion Gex (September 24, 1907 – October 6, 1971) was an American lawyer and politician. He was a member of the Mississippi House of Representatives, representing Hancock County, from 1936 to 1940.

== Biography ==
Lucien Marion Gex was born on September 24, 1907, in Bay St. Louis, Hancock County, Mississippi. He was the son of Walter J. Gex and Amanda (VanGohren) Gex. Lucien graduated from St. Stanislaus High School in Bay St. Louis, and from the Tulane School of Law in New Orleans. He began practicing law in 1930. He then served as the City Attorney of Bay St. Louis. Gex was elected to represent Hancock County in the Mississippi House of Representatives from 1936 to 1940. In the House, he was a member of the Banks and Banking; Fisheries, Commerce, and Shipping; Municipalities; and Judiciary "A" committees. Gex also served as the first president of the Hancock County Bar Association. Gex died of a heart attack on October 6, 1971, at Hancock General Hospital in Bay St. Louis.

== Personal life ==
Gex was a Roman Catholic. He was married to Geraldine and had 3 children and 12 grandchildren. Lucien Gex's relatives Emile J. Gex and Walter Phillips also both served in the Mississippi Legislature.
