= List of medieval land terms =

The feudal system, in which the land was owned by a monarch, who in exchange for homage and military service granted its use to tenants-in-chief, who in their turn granted its use to sub-tenants in return for further services, gave rise to several terms, particular to Britain, for subdivisions of land which are no longer in wide use. These medieval land terms include the following:

- a burgage, a plot of land rented from a lord or king
- a hide: the hide, from the Anglo-Saxon word meaning "family", was, in the early medieval period, a land-holding that was considered sufficient to support a family. This was equivalent to 60 to 120 acres depending on the quality of the land. The hide was the basis for the assessment of taxes. The hide was not ubiquitous in Anglo-Saxon England, with, for example, land in Kent being assessed in sulungs (approximately twice the size of the average hide).
- a Knight's fee: is the amount of land for which the services of a knight (for 40 days) were due to the Crown. It was determined by land value, and the number of hides in a Knight's Fee varied.
- a hundred: a division of an English shire consisting of 100 hides. The hundreds of Stoke, Desborough and Burnham in Buckinghamshire are known as the Chiltern Hundreds.
- a franconian Lan used in Poland since the 13th century, consisted of 43.2 morgs = 23 to 28 hectares. The term Lan was also used to indicate a full-sized farm, as opposed to one split up into a number of smaller sections.
- a wapentake: a subdivision of a county used in Yorkshire and other areas of strong Danish influence. It is similar to hundred or a ward. It was used in Yorkshire, Lincolnshire, Nottinghamshire, Derbyshire, Leicestershire and Rutland.
- a shire was originally a type of a subdivision of a county; some shires evolved into administrative areas equivalent to a county; a shire was headed by a shire reeve (becoming sheriff, in Saskatchewan the mayor of a rural municipality is a reeve); shires were most commonly subdivided into hundreds, but other types of subdivisions were also made
- a rape: Sussex was divided into six rapes, which were intermediate divisions between the county and the hundred. A rape was to have its own river, forest and castle.
- a lathe: Kent was divided into five lathes, from the Old English laeth, meaning district.
- a riding: was a division of land in Yorkshire and in Lindsey, which was the northern part of modern day Lincolnshire. The riding was a third part of the shire. The name is derived from the Old Norse thriding, meaning "one-third".
- a ward: a ward is a subdivision of a county, equivalent to a wapentake or a hundred. It was used in Northumberland, Cumberland, Westmorland, and Durham.

== See also ==
- Manorialism
