= Borris Great, Borris, County Laois =

Townland in County Laois, Ireland

Coordinates: 53.0551°N 7.2857°W

Borris Great is a townland in the civil parish of Borris, County Laois, Ireland. It is to the north of Portlaoise.

Historically, it is in the barony of Maryborough East in County Leix (now Laois).
