= List of storms named Cristina =

The names Cristina and Christina have been used for eight tropical cyclones in the East Pacific Ocean and for one European windstorm.

In the East Pacific:

- Hurricane Cristina (1984) – a Category 2 hurricane that did not affect land
- Tropical Storm Cristina (1990) – did not affect land
- Tropical Storm Cristina (1996) – became the third tropical cyclone in ten days to make landfall in Mexico, causing 13 fatalities
- Tropical Storm Cristina (2002) – did not affect land
- Tropical Storm Cristina (2008) – did not affect land
- Hurricane Cristina (2014) – a Category 4 hurricane that affected southwestern and western Mexico
- Tropical Storm Cristina (2020) – a high-end tropical storm that affected Socorro Island
- Tropical Storm Cristina (2026) – a weak tropical storm that moved in an erratic path, affected Central America, and caused heavy rainfall

In Europe:

- Cyclone Christina (2014) – affected multiple countries in Western Europe and Morocco, causing three fatalities
