= Jourdan River =

Location
- Country: United States
- State: Mississippi

Physical characteristics
- Mouth: Bay of St. Louis
  - coordinates: 30.34°N 89.36°W

The Jourdan River is a tidal river in the U.S. state of Mississippi.

== Etymology ==
The Jourdan River is named after Noel Jourdan, who received a land grant in the area from the Spanish Empire.

== Hydrology ==
The river is tidally influenced and contains freshwater. There is 0.1 ppt of dissolved salts in the water. The water is also classed as blackwater.

The river feeds into the Bay of St. Louis; it is one of two main sources of freshwater to the bay along with the Wolf River.

== History ==
The first inhabitants around the river were Choctaw and Muscogee before the French settled the area. In the nineteenth century, the Jourdan River was used for water transportation around Kiln. A shipyard and sawmill were built on the river in this time period.

The Jourdan River is prone to flooding. In 1969, due to Hurricane Camille, floods occurred 20 miles (32 km) upstream of the river. As a result of Tropical Storm Arthur in 2026, floods blocked Mississippi Highway 603 and infiltrated Kiln.

== Environment ==
The mouth of the Jourdan River is a salt marsh. Phragmites australis is found near in this area. The upper reaches of the river have a cypress dome biome.
