= Maryborough West =

Barony in County Laois, Ireland

Maryborough West Port Laoise Thiar (Irish)
- Barony
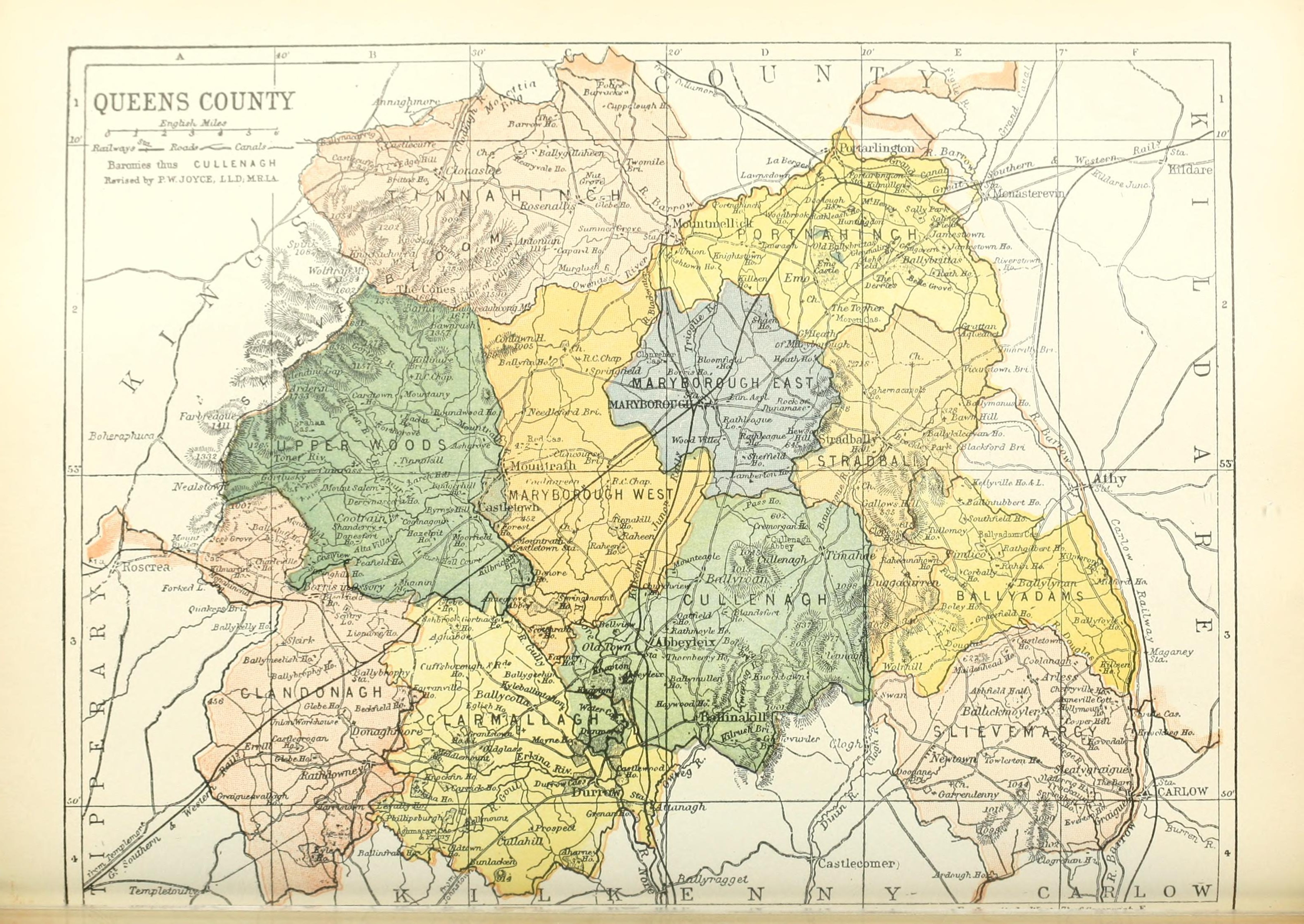
- Barony map of Queen's County, 1900; Maryborough West is orange, in the centre.
- Sovereign state: Ireland
- Province: Leinster
- County: Laois

Area
  - Total: 169.62 km^{2} (65.49 sq mi)
  - Water: 0.105 km^{2} (0.041 sq mi)

Maryborough West or West Maryborough (Irish: Port Laoise Thiar) is a barony in County Laois (formerly called Queen's County or County Leix), Ireland.

== Etymology ==
Maryborough is the former name of the town of Portlaoise, established in 1548 and named after Queen Mary I; it was given its current name in 1929.

== Geography ==
Maryborough West is located in west-central County Laois, with the River Nore flowing through its southern part. Lough Ballyfin is the only lake of any size.

== History ==
Maryborough East and West were in the Middle Ages the land of the Cinel Crimthann, an Irish clan with the surname Ó Duibh (Duffy or O'Diff).

Maryborough was originally a single barony; it was divided into East and West before 1807.

== List of settlements ==
Below is a list of settlements in Maryborough West barony:

- Abbeyleix (northern part)
- Ballyfin
- Kilbricken (eastern part)
- Mountrath
- Shanahoe
