= Borris Little, Borris, County Laois =

Townland in County Laois, Ireland

Borris Little is a townland in the civil parish of Borris in the barony of Maryborough East in County Leix.
