= Boris (surname) =

Boris is a surname. Notable people with the surname include:

- Angel Boris (born 1974), American Playboy Playmate of the Month, model and actress
- Jean-Pierre Boris, journalist at Radio France Internationale
- Paul Boris (born 1955), American baseball player
- Trevor Boris (born 1980), Canadian comedian, writer and television producer
