= Tropical Storm Boris (2026) =

Pacific tropical storm in June 2026

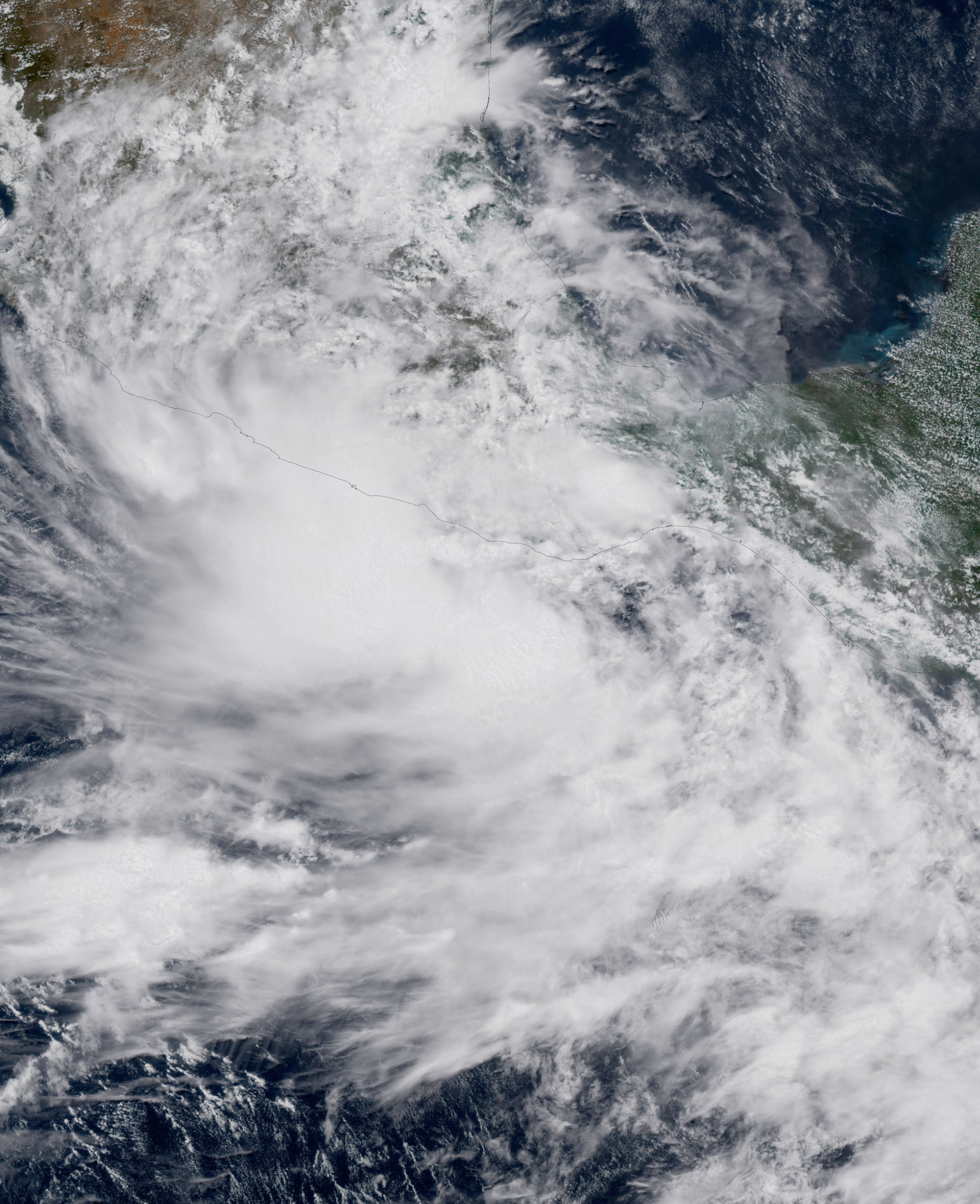
- Boris south of Guerrero on June 8

Meteorological history
- Formed: June 7, 2026
- Post-tropical: June 9, 2026
- Dissipated: June 9, 2026

Tropical storm
- 1-minute sustained (SSHWS/NWS)
- Highest winds: 50 mph (85 km/h)
- Lowest pressure: 1000 mbar (hPa); 29.53 inHg

Overall effects
- Fatalities: 5
- Damage: $100 million (2026 USD)
- Areas affected: Southern Mexico
- Part of the 2026 Pacific hurricane season

Tropical Storm Boris (/boʊrˈiːs/ bohr-EES) was a weak and short-lived tropical cyclone that made landfall in Mexico. The second named storm of the 2026 Pacific hurricane season, Boris originated from a tropical wave off Mexico on June 7. Boris began moving slowly east-northeast and then strengthened into a tropical storm on June 8. Boris then turned sharply north and made landfall close to the border of Guerrero and Oaxaca on June 9. Once inland, Boris quickly weakened to a tropical depression and degenerated into a post tropical cyclone.

In anticipation of Boris, tropical cyclone watches and warnings were issued for portions of the southwestern coast of Mexico. Boris generated heavy rain that triggered flash flooding and landslides across southern Mexico. In Oaxaca, several major roads were damaged by landslides while 800 homes were inundated by floodwaters. Businesses in Acapulco, Guerrero, suffered significant commercial losses from closures. In Colima, three people drowned after being swept away by rough surf. In Oaxaca, a man drowned after being swept away by an overflowing river. As of July 2026, Arthur J. Gallagher & Co. estimated that losses totaled to US$100 million.

== Meteorological history ==
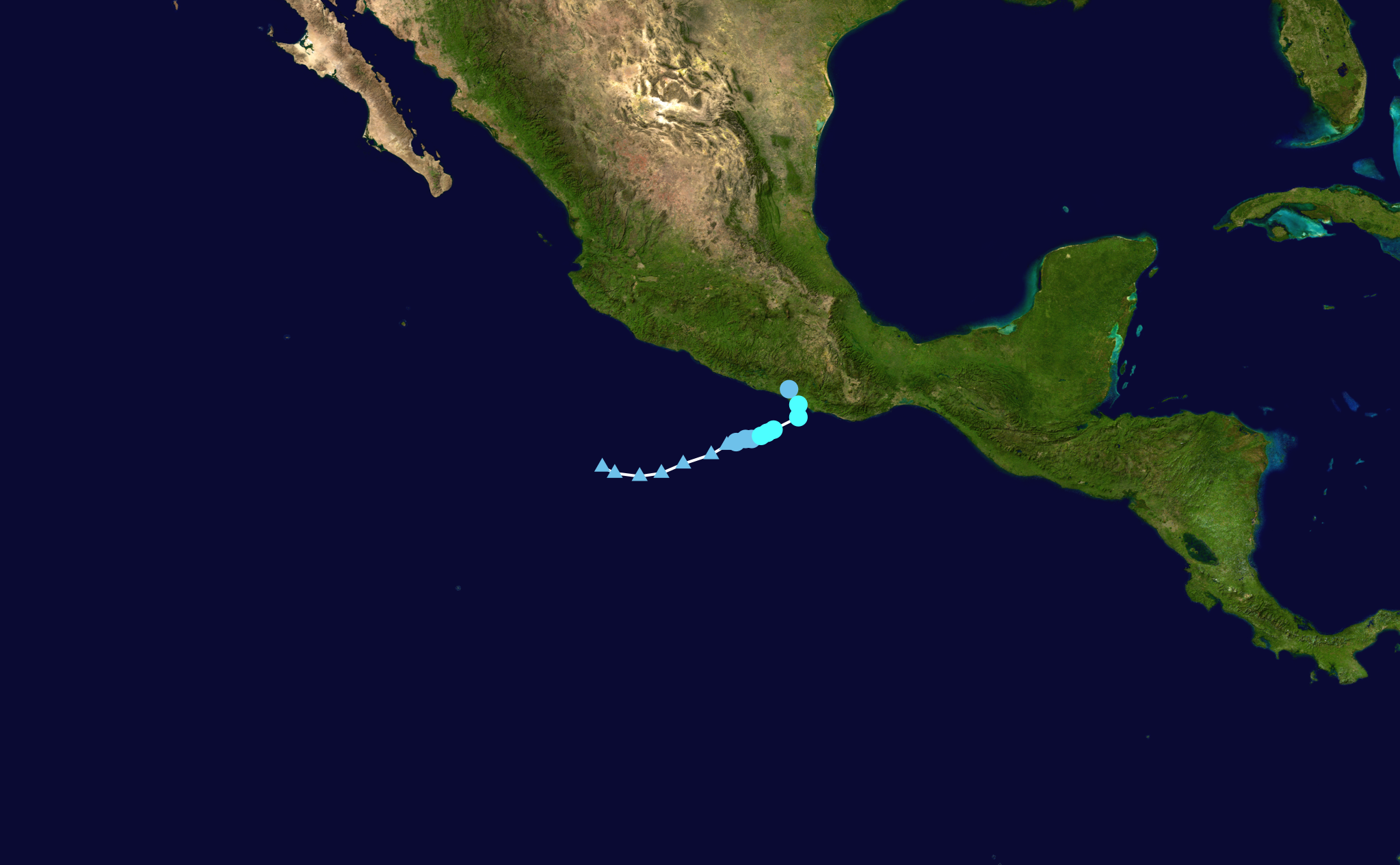
Map plotting the storm's track and intensity, according to the Saffir–Simpson scale Map key Saffir–Simpson scale Tropical depression (≤38 mph, ≤62 km/h) Tropical storm (39–73 mph, 63–118 km/h) Category 1 (74–95 mph, 119–153 km/h) Category 2 (96–110 mph, 154–177 km/h) Category 3 (111–129 mph, 178–208 km/h) Category 4 (130–156 mph, 209–251 km/h) Category 5 (≥157 mph, ≥252 km/h) Unknown Storm type Tropical cyclone Subtropical cyclone Extratropical cyclone, remnant low, tropical disturbance, or monsoon depression

Boris originated form a disturbance progressing westward within a monsoon trough located over the northeast Pacific Ocean. The disturbance would eventually decouple and turn eastward. On June 4, a trough with significant convection formed off to the southwest of the coast of Mexico. Trough June 5 and June 6, Oceansat-3 indicated that the convection became more persistent. On June 7, an Oceansat-3 pass had indicated that the disturbance had consolidated a closed low-level circulation, the low was classified as Tropical Depression Two-E at 15:00 UTC. At this point in time, the system was still elongated and sea surface temperatures off the southern coast of Mexico were above 80 °F (27 °C). Early on June 8, the system acquired tropical storm-force wind and received the name Boris with help from the diurnal fluctuation of strength. That day, Boris would reach its peak intensity before encountering strong wind shear. Movement was slow on June 8 due to Boris being embedded in a cyclonic circulation. On June 9, the system's pattern of convection would deteriorate. Boris then turned north and made landfall close to the border of Guerrero and Oaxaca on June 9 at 05:00 UTC. After landfall, convection within the system collapsed before dissipating by 18:00 UTC.

== Preparations ==
A tropical storm warning was issued for the southern Mexican coast from Lagunas de Chacahua, Oaxaca, to Tecpan de Galeana, Guerrero. The Government of Guerrero issued a red alert for Acapulco. Plan Marina was activated prior to the storm by the Secretariat of the Navy. Claudia Sheinbaum, President of Mexico, activated Plan DN-III-E. The Comisión Federal de Electricidad assembled a team of 145 people to monitor infrastructure to be impacted by Boris.

All classes managed by the Guerrero Ministry of Education along with all classes except those in the northern regions of the Autonomous University of Guerrero were suspended for June 8. After Boris's landfall, schools were suspended another day along with many government buildings. In Acapulco, canals were cleared of obstructions to allow for the escape of water. The Port of Acapulco was closed. Those in the vicinity of the Rio Atoyac were also urged to evacuate. In Guerrero, 629 shelters were opened. Classes across eight municipalities in Michoacán were suspended. In Puebla, classes were suspended across 130 municipalities. More than 33,000 military personnel, 1,500 vehicles, and five helicopters were deployed. The Mexican Navy deployed 4,017 personnel, 60 vehicles, and 25 vessels. A green emergency alert, signifying a low level of danger, was issued for Oaxaca.

== Impact ==
=== Guerrero ===
Along the coast of Guerrero sustained winds reached up to 50 miles per hour (80 km/h) and gusts were up to 75 miles per hour (120 km/h). Waves up to 20 ft (6 m) were reported in Acapulco.

Several trees and telephone poles fell in the state. Damage was reported across eight municipalities. Streets in Acapulco were flooded and covered in garbage. Restaurants on the coast of Acapulco were impacted by rough seas on their property. Some sewers were clogged by debris. Four fallen trees and one fallen power pole were reported in Acapulco. Twenty businesses were inundated by storm surge. At least 30 palapas were destroyed. Sales from restaurants in Acapulco dropped 80% due to rains from Boris. More than 780 restaurants were forced to close, affecting over 1,800 employees. Commercial losses were estimated at Mex$1.5 billion (US$87.1 million). Hotel occupancy for the days surrounding the impact of Boris in Acapulco was around 20–40%, depending on the area. At least five people were rescued from rough surf. In Barra de Coyuca, at least 65 restaurants were damaged. In Coyuca de Benítez, six boats capsized. Swells from Boris washed up 28 tons of garbage. In Tlapa de Comonfort, the roof of a home partially collapsed.

=== Oaxaca ===
Across the state, heavy rains triggered numerous landslides that damaged a major road between the cities of Oaxaca and Tehuantepec. The Salina Cruz observatory recorded over 12 inches (300 mm) of rain. Damage was reported across 50 municipalities. More than ten neighborhoods were inundated. Power outages were also reported in Oaxaca City and Santa Lucía del Camino. Roads in Oaxaca City became covered with garbage and mud. Landslides were reported along at least 10 sections of a major road between Oaxaca City and Puerto Ángel. Persistent rains in the region increased the occurrence of sewage leakages in some neighborhoods of Oaxaca City. In San Mateo del Mar, 800 homes were inundated. Strong winds damaged several papaya crops. Strong winds tore off the roofs of three restaurants in Roca Blanca. An amphitheater collapsed valued at $3.1 million.

In Salina Cruz, the Playa Abierta seaboard, revitalized earlier in the decade, was degraded by waves from Boris. A vehicle was swept away by an overflowing river. Rains from Boris also spread natural gas from a Pemex pipeline leak in the city, spilling into buildings and threatening La Ventosa Lagoon. An outdoor theater worth Mex$54 million (US$3.16 million) was destroyed by swells. In San Luis Amatlán, a member of a band drowned after his truck was swept away by an overflowing river.

=== Elsewhere ===
Moisture from Boris generated heavy rains that triggered flash flooding across Veracruz. Numerous vehicles were trapped by floodwaters. Damage was reported across seven municipalities. More than 15 neighborhoods were inundated in Coatzacoalcos. In Zongolica, several towns were left isolated after landslides obstructed highways. In Coyutla, a bridge was destroyed. Five landslides and three mudslides were reported.

In Puebla, heavy rains from Boris flooded fifteen homes and caused damage across fifteen municipalities. The Tepequexpa chapel sustained structural damage from the storm. Four bridges were damaged. Power outages were reported across more than 40 communities. The San Marcos River overflowed, damaging drainpipes and leaving homes in Pahuatlán without running water.

Boris also generated rains across Colima, Jalisco, and Michoacán. A woman in Manzanillo, Colima, drowned amidst rough seas after rescue crews had reached her. In Tecomán, Colima, two men were swept away by rough surf and were later found dead.

Remnant moisture from Boris also generated heavy rain over Hidalgo. Fifteen fallen trees were reported. A 59-year-old woman was injured when a factory collapsed in Tepeji del Río. Forty homes were damaged. Also in Tepeji, heavy rains caused at least six stalls at a market to collapse. At least 30 schools were forced to cancel in person classes due to flooding. Twelve municipalities across the state were left isolated. Landslides were reported across 24 roadways and eight roadways were damaged.

In Mexico City, strong winds downed 79 trees and four power poles. Heavy rains caused disruptions to public transportation.

== See also ==
- Other storms with the same name
- Weather of 2026
- 2026 Pacific hurricane season
