= Bay St. Louis, Mississippi =

- City
- The Bay of St. Louis, the new bay bridge, and the city of Bay St. Louis on the western shore (upper part of photo)

- Flag Logo

- Location of Bay St. Louis, MS

- Location in the United States
- Coordinates: 30°18′53″N 89°20′39″W
- Country: United States
- State: Mississippi
- County: Hancock

Government
  - Mayor: Mike Favre (R)

Area
  - Total: 26.62 sq mi (68.95 km^{2})
  - Land: 14.69 sq mi (38.05 km^{2})
  - Water: 11.93 sq mi (30.90 km^{2})
- Elevation: 23 ft (7 m)

Population (2020)
  - Total: 9,284
  - Density: 631.9/sq mi (243.99/km^{2})
- Time zone: UTC−6 (Central (CST))
  - Summer (DST): UTC−5 (CDT)
- ZIP Code: 39520–39522
- Area code: 228
- FIPS code: 28-03980
- GNIS feature ID: 0666588
- Website: www.baystlouis-ms.gov

Bay St. Louis is a city in and the county seat of Hancock County, Mississippi, in the United States. Located on the Gulf Coast on the west side of the Bay of St. Louis, it is part of the Gulfport-Biloxi metropolitan area. The population was 9,284 at the 2020 census, up from 9,260 at the 2010 census.

== History ==
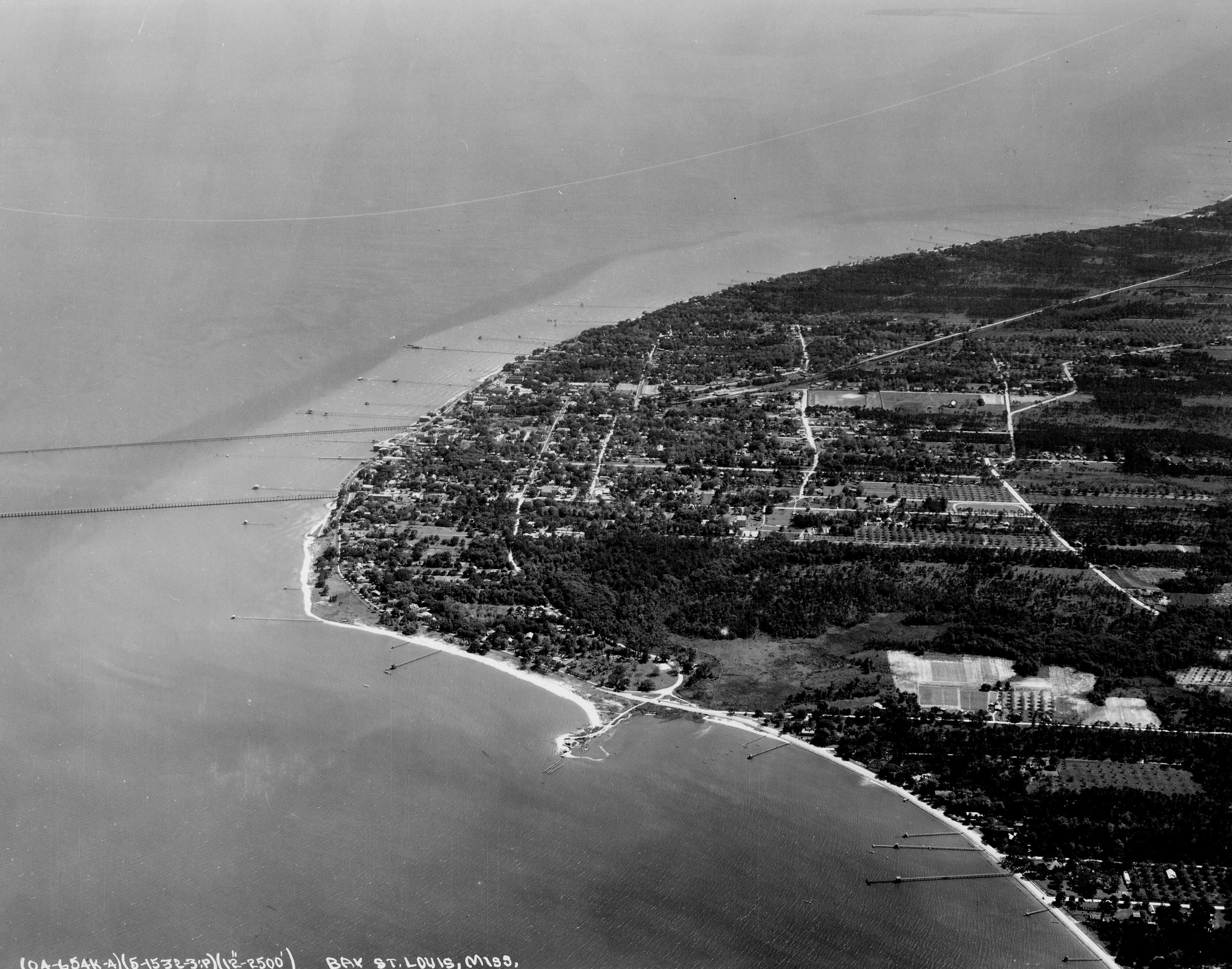
Bay St. Louis seen in 1932

The first European settlers in this area were French colonists, whose culture still influences the small city. While developing a plantation culture in the area, they imported enslaved people, originally from Africa, to work the land. A Creole population developed of people of color as well as whites with significant French ancestry.

The county was organized by European Americans, who named it after John Hancock, who was a Founding Father of the United States. While more Protestant Americans migrated into this area after the statehood of Mississippi in 1817 and Indian Removal in the 1830s, there are still many Catholic families, some descendant from both African and French ancestors of the colonial era. Roman Catholic schools still draw area students.

== Geography ==
Bay St. Louis is located in southeastern Hancock County. It is situated on the west side of the Bay of St. Louis which empties into the Mississippi Sound, adjacent to Pass Christian to the east. The city is bordered to the north by the Jourdan River, the primary inlet of the bay and Diamondhead. The eastern border of the city is the Harrison County line in the middle of the bay.

According to the United States Census Bureau, the city has a total area of 26.6 square miles (69.0 km^{2}), of which 14.7 square miles (38.1 km^{2}) are land and 11.9 square miles (30.9 km^{2}), or 44,82%, are water.

=== Hurricanes ===
On August 17, 1969, Hurricane Camille brushed over the St. Bernard Parish in Louisiana before crossing over the Mississippi Sound and before making final landfall in the Mississippi gulf coast. The eye passed over Waveland directly to the West of Bay St. Louis.

On August 29, 2005, at 10:00 a.m. CDT, Hurricane Katrina made its final landfall just west of Bay St. Louis, at the mouth of the Pearl River, causing a 28-foot (8.5 m) storm surge. Hurricane Katrina came ashore during the high tide of 9:15AM, +2.3 feet more, causing a storm tide more than 30 feet (9.1 m) high.

USGS topographic maps show a common 25-foot (7.6 m) elevation contour line running throughout a ridge along the former routing of Highway 90 (Old Spanish Trail) on the western edge of the city. As higher ground, this area was spared inundation from the storm surge of Hurricane Katrina.

Katrina damaged more than 40 Mississippi libraries, including severe roof and water damage to the Bay St. Louis Public Library. The library reopened to the public on October 12, 2005.

The Bay St. Louis Bridge on US Highway 90 was severely damaged, with many bridge sections down-dropped at the west edges. The destroyed bridge was replaced by a new Bay St. Louis Bridge, which received America's Transportation Award. It includes a pedestrian bridge with an art walk featuring the works of local artists.

The underground utility infrastructure in Bay St. Louis received a federally funded total overhaul and replacement.

=== Climate ===
The climate in this area is characterized by hot, humid summers and generally mild to cool winters. According to the Köppen Climate Classification system, Bay St. Louis has a humid subtropical climate, abbreviated "Cfa" on climate maps.

=== Adjacent cities and towns ===
- Diamondhead (north)
- Pass Christian (east)
- Waveland (west)

== Demographics ==
Historical population
Census	Pop.	Note	%±
1880	1,978		—
1890	1,974		−0.2%
1900	2,872		45.5%
1910	3,388		18.0%
1920	3,033		−10.5%
1930	3,724		22.8%
1940	4,138		11.1%
1950	4,621		11.7%
1960	5,073		9.8%
1970	6,752		33.1%
1980	7,850		16.3%
1990	8,063		2.7%
2000	8,209		1.8%
2010	9,260		12.8%
2020	9,284		0.3%
U.S. Decennial Census

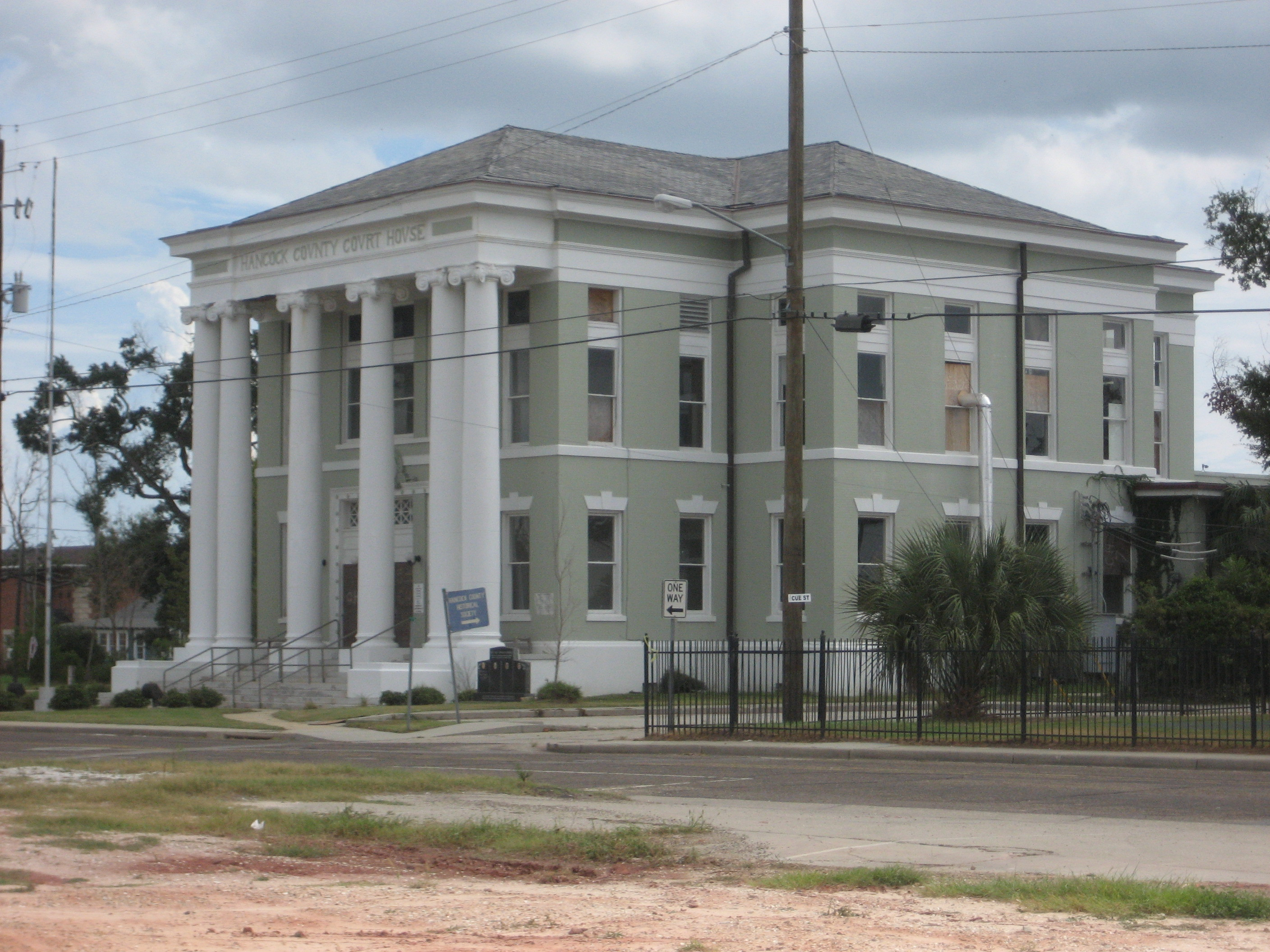
Hancock County Courthouse in Bay St. Louis

=== 2020 census ===
As of the 2020 census, Bay St. Louis had a population of 9,284. The median age was 48.6 years. 18.3% of residents were under the age of 18 and 23.7% of residents were 65 years of age or older. For every 100 females there were 94.3 males, and for every 100 females age 18 and over there were 90.0 males age 18 and over.

100.0% of residents lived in urban areas, while 0.0% lived in rural areas.

There were 4,251 households in Bay St. Louis, of which 23.6% had children under the age of 18 living in them. Of all households, 38.0% were married-couple households, 21.6% were households with a male householder and no spouse or partner present, and 33.2% were households with a female householder and no spouse or partner present. About 36.3% of all households were made up of individuals and 16.7% had someone living alone who was 65 years of age or older.

There were 5,447 housing units, of which 22.0% were vacant. The homeowner vacancy rate was 3.0% and the rental vacancy rate was 9.2%.

Racial composition as of the 2020 census
Race	Number	Percent
White	7,098	76.5%
Black or African American	1,375	14.8%
American Indian and Alaska Native	51	0.5%
Asian	95	1.0%
Native Hawaiian and Other Pacific Islander	1	0.0%
Some other race	117	1.3%
Two or more races	547	5.9%
Hispanic or Latino (of any race)	396	4.3%

== Education ==
Almost all of the city of Bay St. Louis is served by the Bay St. Louis-Waveland School District. Small portions of land are within the Hancock County School District.

It is the home of Bay High School. In addition to Bay High, there are private Catholic schools: Saint Stanislaus College, a residency and day school for boys grades 7–12; and Our Lady Academy, a day school for girls grades 7–12. The latter two share some classrooms as well as a Roman Catholic curriculum.

All of Hancock County is in the service area of Pearl River Community College.

== Media ==
The 1966 movie This Property Is Condemned starring Natalie Wood and Robert Redford was filmed in Bay St. Louis, which was called "Dodson" in the movie, with some additional shooting in Biloxi, Mississippi, and New Orleans, Louisiana.

== Infrastructure ==
=== Major highways ===
- Interstate 10 passes through the northern extension of the city, 10 miles (16 km) northwest of downtown, with access from Exit 13 (Highway 603). I-10 leads east 37 miles (60 km) to Biloxi and southwest 54 miles (87 km) to New Orleans.
- U.S. Highway 90 passes just north of downtown Bay St. Louis, leading east across the St. Louis Bay Bridge to Pass Christian. Via US 90 it is 15 miles (24 km) east to Gulfport and 60 miles (97 km) southwest to New Orleans.
- Mississippi Highway 603 runs along the western edge of the Bay St. Louis city limits, connecting US 90 and Interstate 10.

=== Rail ===
Amtrak's Mardi Gras Service provides inter-city rail travel between Mobile, Alabama and New Orleans, Louisiana.

== Notable people ==
- Stephen E. Ambrose (1936–2002), historian and author
- Richmond Barthé (1901–1989), sculptor associated with the Harlem Renaissance
- J. P. Compretta, former member of the Mississippi House of Representatives
- Lucien M. Gex, former member of the Mississippi House of Representatives
- Leo Fabian Fahey (1898–1950), coadjutor bishop of the Diocese of Baker City, Oregon from 1948 until 1950
- Shannon Garrett (born 1972), former professional Canadian football player
- Walter J. Gex III (1939–2020), United States district judge of the United States District Court for the Southern District of Mississippi
- Valena C. Jones (1872–1917), educator
- Jacob Lindgren (born 1993), MLB player
- Philip Moran, member of the Mississippi State Senate
- Alice Moseley, folk artist
- Leo Norris (1908–1987), former infielder for the Philadelphia Phillies
- Carlile Pollock Patterson, fourth superintendent of the United States Coast Survey (renamed the United States Coast and Geodetic Survey during his tenure)
- Albert J. Raboteau (1943–2021), is an African-American scholar of African and African-American religions
- Lawrence E. Roberts, pilot with the Tuskegee Airmen and colonel in the United States Air Force
- John Scafide, former offensive lineman for the Boston Redskins and mayor of Bay St. Louis from 1953 to 1969
- Tolu Smith, National Basketball Association player
- Caroline Snedeker, children's author
- Gene Taylor, member of the United States House of Representatives from 1989 to 2011
- Tank Williams, former NFL player

== See also ==
- List of cities in Mississippi
- Old Bay St. Louis Historic District
