= List of storms named Boris =

The name Boris has been used for eight tropical cyclones in the Eastern Pacific Ocean.

- Hurricane Boris (1984) – long-lived Category 1 hurricane that did not affect land
- Hurricane Boris (1990) – a Category 1 hurricane whose outer rainbands produced moderate rain in several Mexican states
- Hurricane Boris (1996) – a Category 1 hurricane that made landfall in southern Mexico causing heavy flooding that resulted in ten fatalities
- Tropical Storm Boris (2002) – a moderate tropical storm that dumped heavy rains on sections of the Mexican coast
- Hurricane Boris (2008) – a Category 1 hurricane with no impacts on land
- Tropical Storm Boris (2014) – a weak tropical storm that struck southern Mexico in early June
- Tropical Storm Boris (2020) – a weak tropical storm that moved into the Central Pacific without affecting land
- Tropical Storm Boris (2026) – a large but short-lived tropical storm that quickly made landfall on the Mexican coast

The name Boris has also been used for one extratropical cyclone.

- Storm Boris (2024) – a moderate windstorm that impacted Europe
