= 2026 in Central America =

Guatemala, El Salvador, Honduras, Nicaragua, Costa Rica, Panama and Belize are historically the seven nations in Central America politically and geographically.

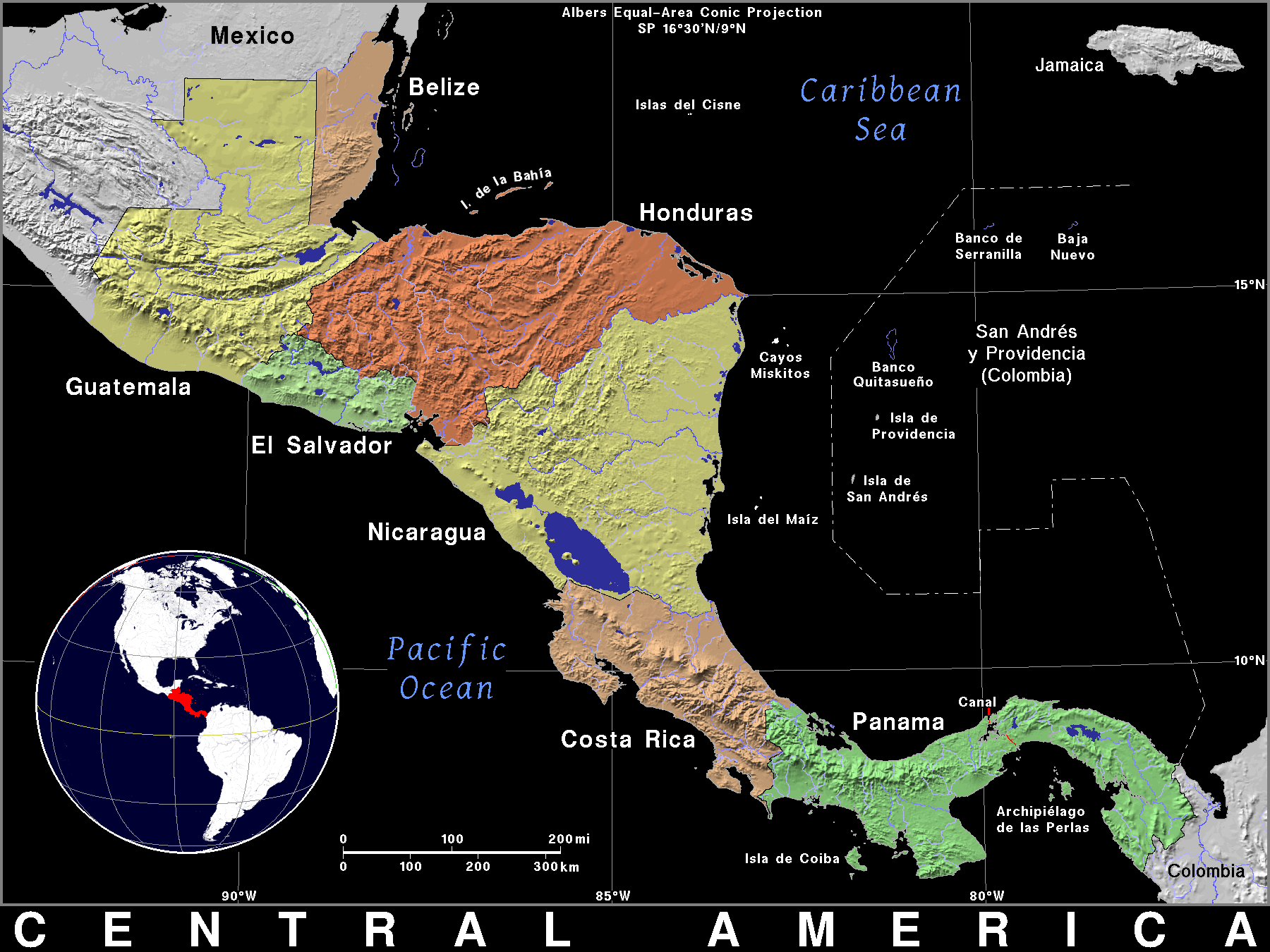
Central America geography

The combined population of Central America is estimated at 186.05 million (2025).

The following lists events of 2026 in Central America.

== Sovereign states ==
=== Belize ===
(Belize)

- Monarch: Charles III (2022–present)
- Prime Minister: Johnny Briceño (2020–present)
- Governor-General: Dame Froyla Tzalam (2021–present)
- Chief Justice of Belize: Louise Blenman (2022–present)

=== Costa Rica ===
(Costa Rica)

- President: Rodrigo Chaves Robles (2022–present)
- First Vice President: Mary Munive (2022–2026)
- Second Vice President: vacant

=== El Salvador ===
(El Salvador)

- President: Nayib Bukele (2019–present)
- Vice President: Félix Ulloa (2019–present)

=== Guatemala ===
(Guatemala)

- President: Bernardo Arévalo (2024–present)
- Vice-president: Karin Herrera (2024–present)

=== Honduras ===
(Honduras)

- President: Xiomara Castro (2022–present)
- First Vice President: Doris Gutiérrez (2024–present)
- Second Vice President: Renato Florentino (2022–present)
- President of the National Congress: Luis Redondo (2022–present)

=== Nicaragua ===
(Nicaragua)

- Co-president: Daniel Ortega (2025–present)
- Co-president: Rosario Murillo (2025–present)

=== Panama ===
(Panama)

- President: José Raúl Mulino (2024–present)
- Vice President: vacant

== Dependencies ==
- San Andrés and Providencia (Colombia)

== Holidays ==
=== January to March ===
- 1 January – New Year's Day
- 9 January– Martyrs' Day (Panama)
- 15 January – George Price Day, Belize
- 16 February – Carnival, Panama
- 9 March – National Heroes & Benefactors Day, Belize

=== April to June ===
- 2 April – Maundy Thursday, Nicaragua
- 3 April – Good Friday
- 4 April – Holy Saturday, Belize
- 6 April – Easter Monday
- 11 April – Juan Santamaría, Costa Rica
- 14 April – Americas Day, Honduras
- 1 May – Labour Day

=== July to September ===
- 19 July – Liberation Day, Nicaragua
- 25 July – Guanacaste Day, Costa Rica
- 1 August – Emancipation Day, Belize
- 2 August – Lady of the Angels Day (Costa Rica)
- 15 August – Assumption Day, Mother's Day, Costa Rica
- 31 August – Day of the Black Person and Afro-Costa Rican Culture
- 10 September – St. George's Caye Day, Belize
- 14 September – Battle of San Jacinto, Nicaragua
- 15 September – Independence Day, Guatemala, Honduras, El Salvador, Nicaragua, and Costa Rica
- 21 September – Independence Day, Belize

=== October to December ===
- 3 October – Francisco Morazán, Honduras
- 12 October – Indigenous People's Resistance Day
- 20 October – Guatemalan Revolution
- 21 October – Army Day, Honduras
- 3 November – Separation of Panama from Colombia
- 5 November – Colon, Panama
- 10–11 November – Uprising of Los Santos, Panama
- 19 November – Garifuna Settlement Day, Belize
- 28 November – Independence of Panama from Spain
- 1 December – Army Abolition Day, Costa Rica
- 8 December – Mother's Day, Panama
- 8 December – Immaculate Conception, Nicaragua
- 20 December – National Mourning Day, Panama
- 25 December – Christmas Day
- 26 December – Boxing Day, Belize

== See also ==
- 2020s
- 2020s in political history
- Central American Parliament
- List of state leaders in Central America in 2026
