= Borris, Roscrea =

Townland in County Tipperary, Ireland

Borris is a townland in the civil parish of Roscrea in County Tipperary.
