= SS Boris =

History

Bulgaria
- Name: SS Boris
- Owner: Soc. Commerciale Bulgare de Nav. a Vap., Varna
- Builder: Wigham Richardson, Wallsend
- Yard number: 302
- Launched: 21 May 1894
- Completed: 23 June 1894
- Fate: Sunk in a collision in November 1920

General characteristics
- Tonnage: 869 GRT; 542 NRT; 804 DWT
- Length: 220 ft (67 m)
- Beam: 32 ft (9.8 m)
- Draught: 17.7 ft (5.4 m)
- Installed power: 165 NHP
- Propulsion: T3-cylinder; Single propeller
- Speed: 13.2 knots (24.4 km/h; 15.2 mph)

SS Boris was the first Bulgarian merchant ship. She was 220 ft (67 m), with a beam of 32 ft (9.8 m) and a draught of 17.7 ft (5.4 m). The power of the engine was 165 n.h.p., providing a speed of 13.2 knots (24.4 km/h; 15.2 mph).

The ship was built by Wigham Richardson, Wallsend, in the United Kingdom, and launched on 21 May 1894. Boris arrived in Bulgaria on 2 July 1894 at 9.30 am in the Bay of Varna. In the first years the ship carried out voyages between the Bulgarian ports. On 21 September 1915 the ships Cyril, Boris, Bulgaria, Varna, and Tsar Ferdinand were moved to Lake Varna and anchored against the Cotton Factory. In 1920, the ship was struck by the Russian steamer Kronstadt near Sevastopol, during the evacuation of the remnants of the White Army of general Vrangel in the Crimea. The Russian side found Sakharov, the captain of Kronstadt, guilty. As a result, Russia offered to replace the Boris with the Yalta.
