= Anchor Lake (Mississippi) =

Lake in Mississippi

- Interactive map of Anchor Lake
- Location: Pearl River County, Mississippi, United States
- Coordinates: 30°37′53″N 89°36′2″W
- Type: Lake
- Part of: Pearl River watershed

Anchor Lake is a retention basin in the US State of Mississippi. The lake is located near Carriere in Pearl River County.

== Dam ==
Anchor Lake Dam is 24 feet (7.3 m) high and 2,500 feet (760 m) long.

== History ==
The dam was completed in 1965.

In 2026, flooding from Tropical Storm Arthur caused a scare and evacuation around Anchor Lake and East Hobolochitto Creek as the dam holding back Anchor Lake threatened failure. A flash flood emergency was also declared for the surrounding area. Officials drained water from the reservoir to prevent overflow.
