= Anchor Lake (Minnesota) =

Lake in the state of Minnesota, United States

- Location within Minnesota
- Location: St. Louis County, Minnesota
- Coordinates: 47°19′17″N 92°29′2″W
- Type: lake

Anchor Lake is a lake in St. Louis County, in the U.S. state of Minnesota. It is approximately 2 miles north of Central Lakes alongside U.S. Route 53. The 216-acre Anchor Lake Wildlife Management Area is located along the southern and eastern shores of the lake.

Anchor Lake was so named on account of its outline being shaped like an anchor.

== See also ==
- List of lakes in Minnesota
