= Wolf River (Mississippi) =

Location
- Country: United States

Physical characteristics
- Source
  - location: Wolf Creek, near Hillsdale, Mississippi
  - elevation: 7 ft (2.1 m)
- Mouth
  - location: Bay of St. Louis
  - coordinates: 30°21′25.7″N 89°17′12.6″W
  - elevation: 20 ft (6.1 m)
- Length: 20 mi (32 km)

The Wolf River is a river in Harrison, Hancock and Pearl River counties, Mississippi, in the United States. Wolf Creek and Mill Creek merge into Wolf River in Hillsdale, Mississippi. It passes the Wolf River Game Management Area. The river also passes through the Wolf River Marsh Coastal Preserve. The preserve is home to nine endangered species and the boundary of the preserve is located in Harrison County. It is home to a non-forested marsh along the Wolf River from Grassy Point to where the marsh ends. Wolf River discharges at the Bay of St. Louis which is known as Dimitry Point and the region is known as Alexander Dimitry Claim.

There are two rivers in Mississippi by the name Wolf River but they are entirely independent of each other. The one in the north is Wolf River (Tennessee). Wolf River was named for the presence of the Mississippi Valley wolf. Wolves no longer inhabit the river region but other wildlife such as foxes, coyotes, turkeys, and songbirds can be found in the area. During the 1800s, the river was used to transport lumber, brick, charcoal, and cordwood. Wolf River is a popular destination for canoers and kayakers.

== See also ==
- List of rivers of Mississippi

== Bibliography ==
- Mohrman, Frederick G. (1985). Energy and Water Development Appropriations for 1986. Washington DC: U.S. Government Printing Office.
- Damrell, A.M. (1893). Annual Reports of the War Department Part 2. Washington DC: U.S. Government Printing Office.
