= Bay of St. Louis =

Estuary in Hancock County, Mississippi, United States

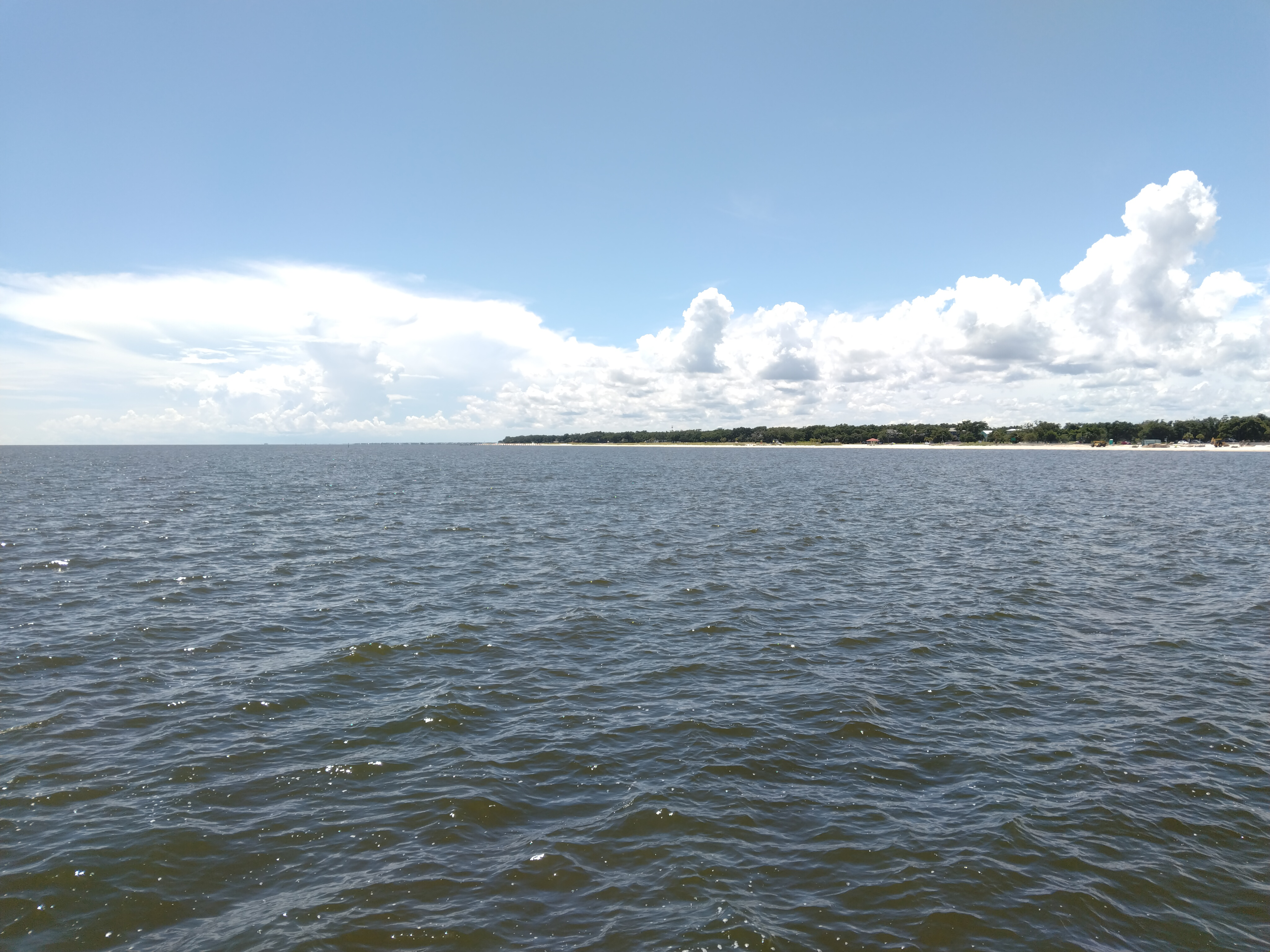

- Location within Mississippi
- Location: Southwest coast of Mississippi
- Coordinates: 30.347°N 89.317°W
- Type: Estuary
- River sources: Jourdan River; Wolf River
- Basin countries: United States
- Average depth: 1.5 m (4 ft 11 in)
- Salinity: <20 (average)
- Settlements: Pass Christian; Bay St. Louis; Diamondhead

The Bay of St. Louis (St. Louis Bay; French: Baie Saint-Louis) is a shallow-water, partially enclosed estuary of the northeast Gulf of Mexico along the southwestern coast of Mississippi.

== Description ==
The estuary receives freshwater input from one blackwater, or swamp-land, the Jourdan River on the west and the Wolf River on the east and some smaller streams (Bayou Portage); these are mixed in the bay with salt water from Mississippi Sound and the Mississippi Bight. The waters are comparatively well mixed, with an average salinity of less than 20.

The Bay of St. Louis is classified as an "impaired" waterway by the United States Environmental Protection Agency due to high fecal coliform levels in the waters from urban development on the bay and surrounding waters.
