= Maryborough East =

Barony in County Laois, Ireland

Maryborough East Port Laoise Thoir (Irish)
- Barony
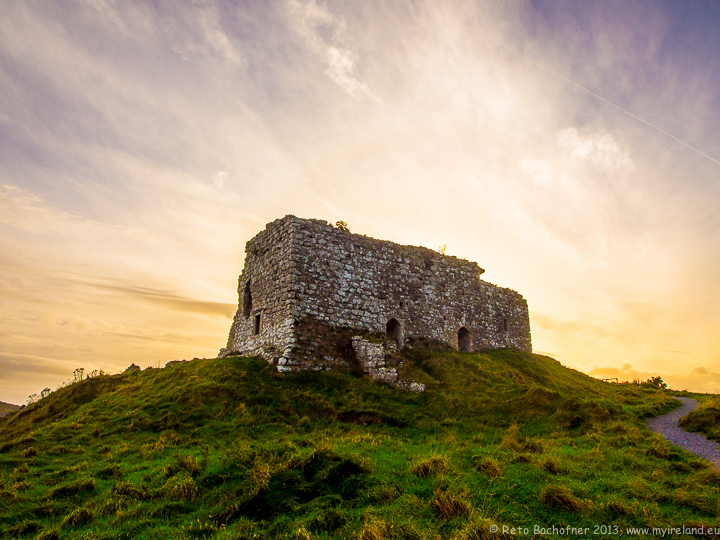
- Dunamase, in the eastern part of Maryborough East

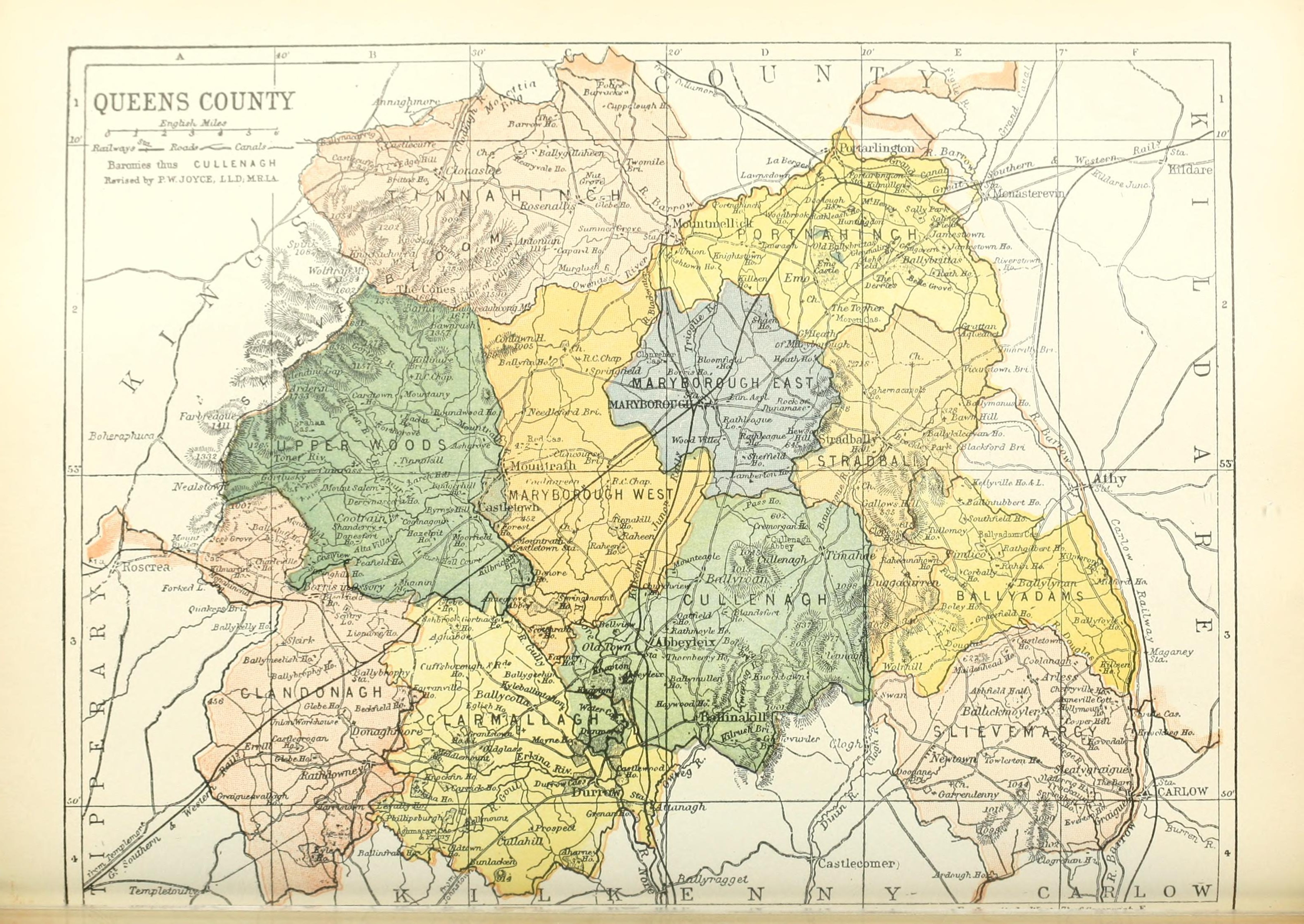
- Barony map of Queen's County, 1900; Maryborough East is blue, in the centre.
- Sovereign state: Ireland
- Province: Leinster
- County: Laois

Area
  - Total: 101.82 km^{2} (39.31 sq mi)

Maryborough East or East Maryborough (Irish: Port Laoise Thoir) is a barony in County Laois (formerly called Queen's County or County Leix), Ireland.

== Etymology ==
Maryborough is the former name of the town of Portlaoise, established in 1548 and named after Queen Mary I; it was given its current name in 1929.

== Geography ==
Maryborough East is located in central County Laois.

== History ==
Maryborough East and West were in the Middle Ages the land of the Cinel Crimthann, an Irish clan with the surname Ó Duibh (Duffy or O'Diff).

It is referred to in the topographical poem Tuilleadh feasa ar Éirinn óigh (Giolla na Naomh Ó hUidhrín, d. 1420):

Fa Dún Mascc as mín fuinn,
O'Duib for Chenel cCrioṁṫainn,
Triath an tíre fa ṫoraḋ,
Iath as míne measrogaḋ.

Translation:

Under Dun Masc of smooth land,
O'Duibh is over Cinel-Criomthainn,
Lord of the territory which is under fruit,
Land of smoothest mast-fruit.

Maryborough was originally a single barony; it was divided into East and West before 1807.

== List of settlements ==
Below is a list of settlements in Maryborough East barony:

- Portlaoise
