= A Sorcerer Comes to a Peasant Wedding =

1875 painting by Vassily Maximov

A Sorcerer comes to a peasant wedding
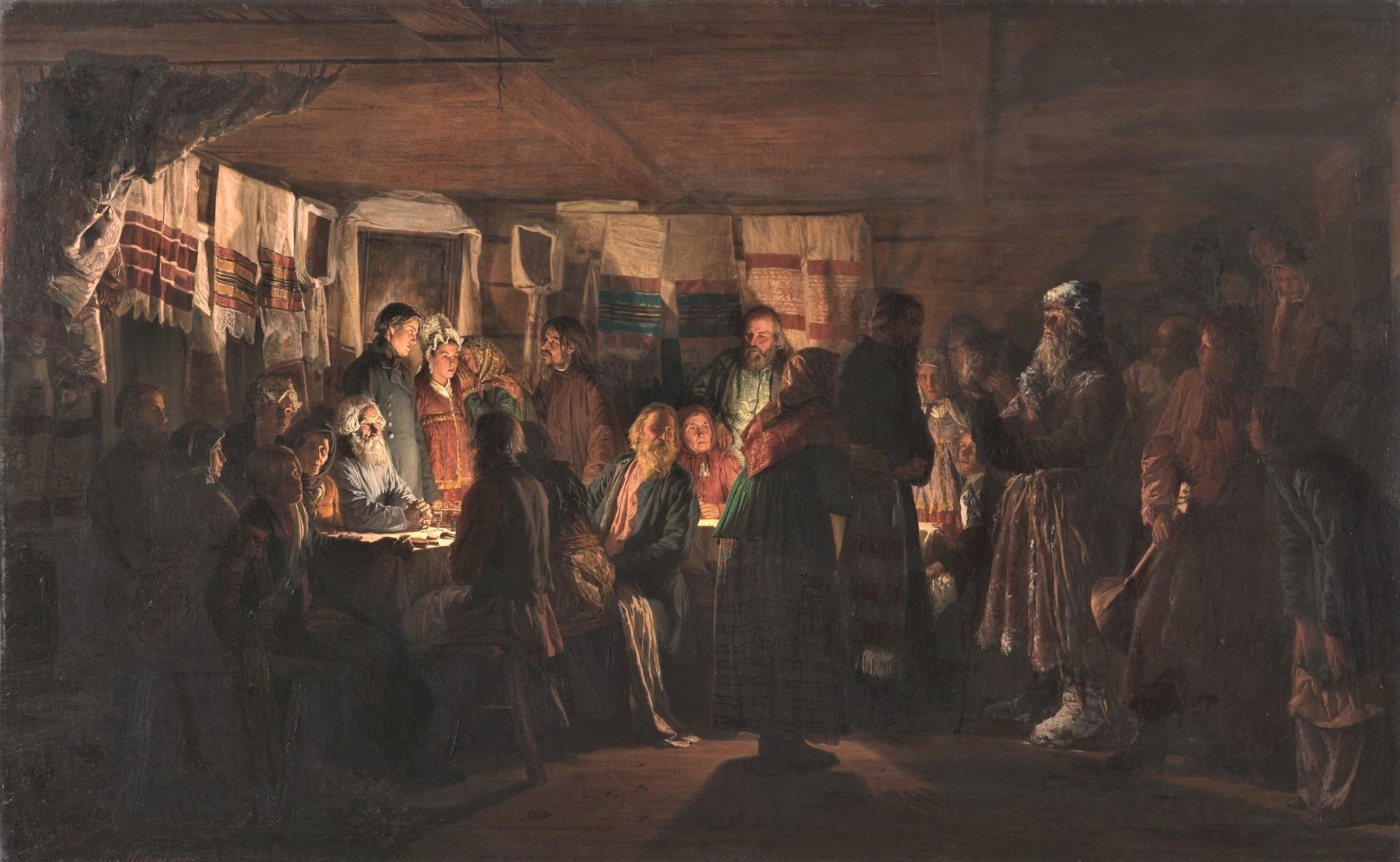
- Artist: Vassily Maximov
- Year: 1875
- Medium: Oil on canvas
- Dimensions: 188 cm × 116 cm (74 in × 46 in)
- Location: State Tretyakov Gallery, Moscow

A Sorcerer Comes to a Peasant Wedding is a painting by the Russian artist Vassily Maximov (1844–1911), completed in 1875. It belongs to the State Tretyakov Gallery (inventory number 585). The size of the canvas is 116×188 cm (according to other data - 117.7×189.8 cm). The painting depicts an episode of a peasant wedding feast, the joyful course of which is disturbed by the sudden appearance of a snow-covered village sorcerer.

Maximov worked on this painting in 1871–1875 and it was presented at 4th Travelling Exhibitions, which opened in St. Petersburg in February 1875. Maximov's work made a good impression — in particular, the critic Adrian Prakhov wrote that the painting was "conceived and painted as if his popular imagination had created it". Immediately after the exhibition, the canvas was bought from the artist by Pavel Tretyakov. In 1878 the painting A Sorcerer Comes to a Peasant Wedding was included in the Russian exposition at the World Exhibition in Paris.

Critic Vladimir Stasov wrote that this painting was a profound and talented picture of "village faith and that domestic spirit which generations of centuries live at home, in remote villages"; in his opinion, it is "the best, most important and most significant" of what Maximov created. Ethnographer Sergey Tokarev noted that in this work the artist "managed to convey extremely expressively and aptly those mixed feelings of superstitious fear, anxiety in the face of some out-of-place power, but at the same time and reverence, which causes all the personality of the old sorcerer who suddenly appeared in the midst of the wedding festivities..." The art historian Dmitry Sarabianov considered the painting A Sorcerer Comes to a Peasant Wedding to be Maximov's best work and wrote that this canvas brought its author universal fame and placed him "in the first ranks of Russian artists-realists".

== History ==
=== Previous events and work on the painting ===
From 1862, Vassily Maximov studied at the Academy of Arts, first as a free student, then in 1863-1866 in the class of history painting, where his mentors were Fyodor Bruni, Timofei Neff, Alexei Markov and Pyotr Shamshin. In 1864 Maximov was awarded a small gold medal for his painting Sick Child (Village Scene). Having refused to participate in the competition for the large gold medal, he left the academy in 1866 with a certificate of class artist of the 3rd degree. In the same year, 1866, the artist moved to the village of Shubino, located in Korchevsky uyezd, Tver province, where he worked as an art teacher at the estate of the Counts Golenishchev-Kutuzovs. In January 1868, Maximov married Lydia Alexandrovna Izmailova, and in June of the same year, he and his wife settled in the village of Chernavino, which was part of Novoladozhsky Uyezd, St. Petersburg province. Maximov himself came from a peasant family — he was from the village of Lopino in the same uyezd as Chernavino.

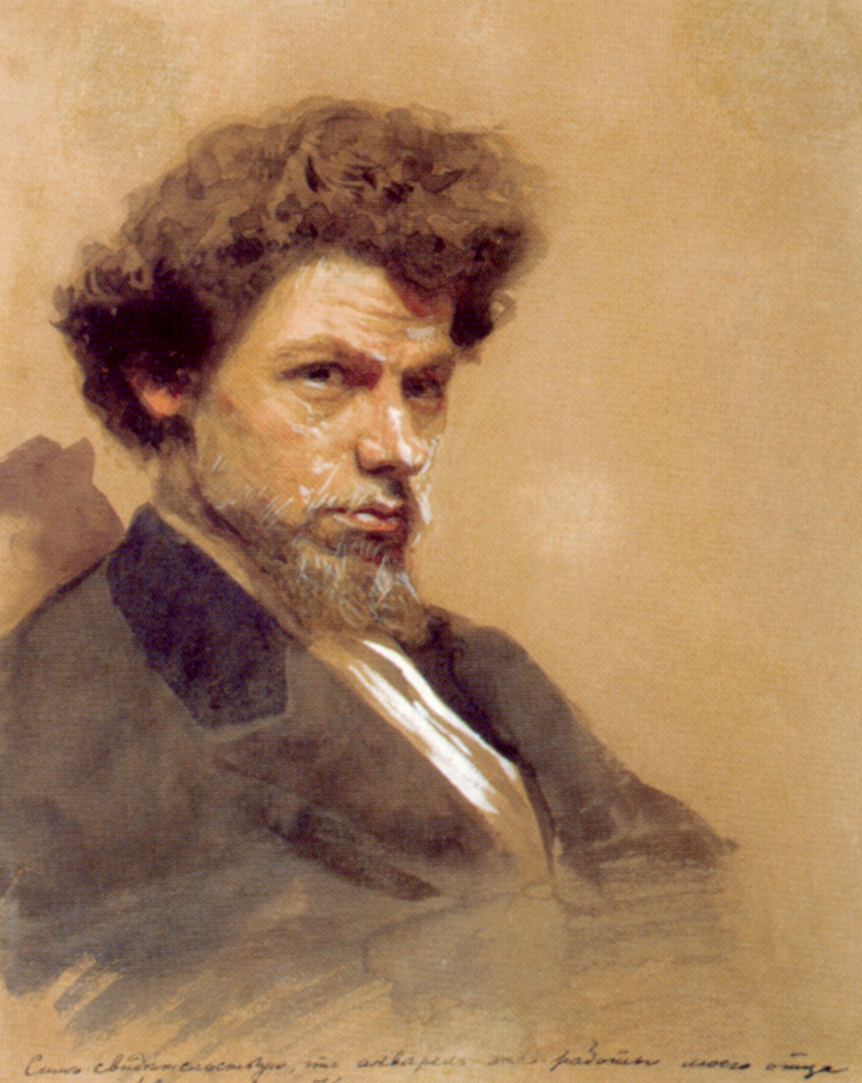
I. N. Kramskoy. Portrait of V. M. Maximov (1878, State Russian Museum of Fine Arts)

In 1870, for the paintings Grandma's Fairy Tales (1867, now in the State Tretyakov Gallery), Dreams of the Future (1868, now in the State Museum of Fine Arts), Gathering for a Walk (1869, now in the State Museum of Kazakhstan) and Old Woman (1869, now in the State Tretyakov Gallery), Maximov was awarded the title of artist of the first clas. According to the architect Rimma Aldonina, such works as Gathering for a Party can be considered as preparatory stages on the way to the great work A Sorcerer Comes to a Peasant Wedding to a Peasant Wedding, the direct work on which began in 1871.

In the fall of 1870, Maximov returned from Chernavin to St. Petersburg. The strenuous work in the village affected the artist's health, and he was ill throughout the winter of 1870-1871. On the doctor's advice, Maximov went south to Kyiv in the spring of 1871 to improve his health; his companion on this trip was the artist Viktor Vasnetsov. During the trip Maximov drew a lot, he was interested in "folk types" that he found in the surrounding villages and towns, as well as among the worshippers in the Kyiv Pechersk Lavra. The artist returned to St. Petersburg in the autumn of 1871, and in the winter of the same year he went back to Chernavino.

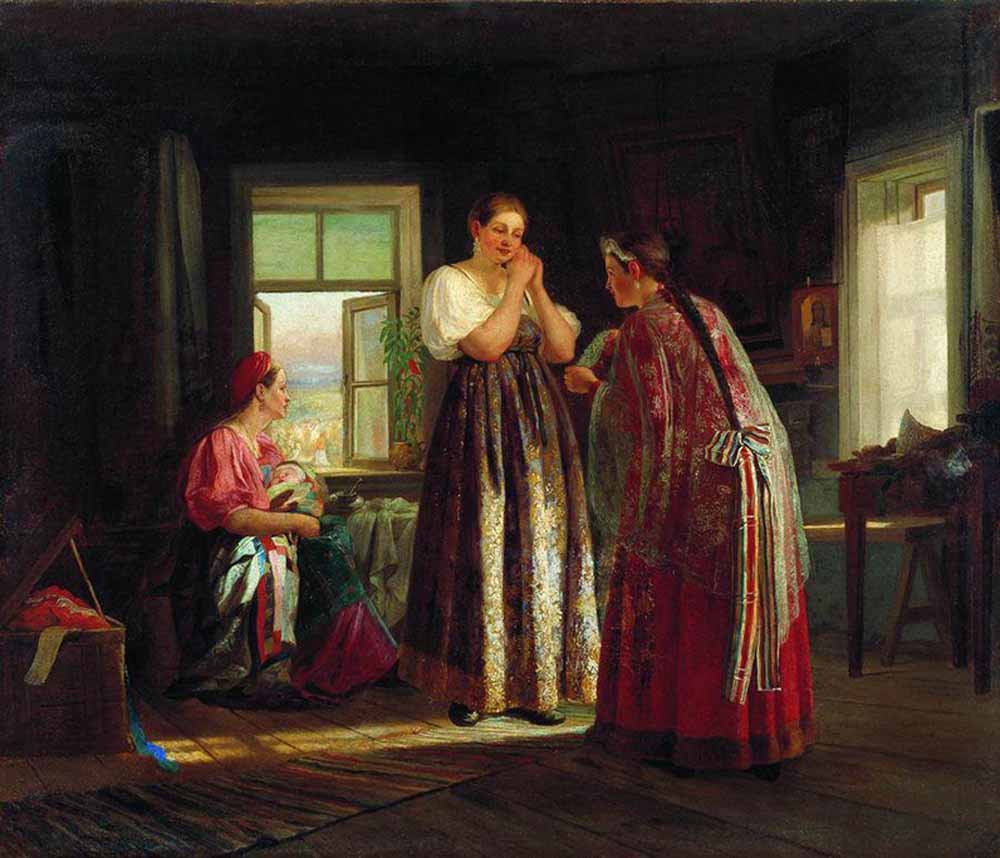
V. M. Maximov. Gathering for a party (1869, State Museum of Fine Arts of Kazakhstan)

Working in the village made it easier for the artist to find peasant sitters for the figures of the future painting The Coming of the Witch at a Peasant Wedding. Besides, the necessity of working in the village house was due to the lack of funds to rent a studio in the city, which would have provided enough space to work on a large painting. However, the village house where Maximov lived was cold and dark. It was not suitable for working on canvas. The artist wrote: "The bad thing is that I often have to spend a whole day with a tow in my hands near the walls — the wind is blowing everywhere, the cold is merciless in my hornitsa. Well, that seems to be the fate of my studios; I have to fiddle with them more than with paintings, but what can you do?"

In the early 1870s, Maximov approached the "Peredvizhniki" group — members of the Society of Travelling Art Exhibitions, whose first exhibition opened on November 29, 1871. (Note: The Julian calendar ("old style") is used to date events that took place in the Russian Empire.) In November 1872 he was elected a member of the Society. In a letter to his wife dated February 28, 1873, Maximov reported that he had been "accepted as a full member of the Society for the painting 'Family Prayer' and unanimously accepted, all this is very pleasant". In the same letter, the artist reported that the Partnership urged him to finish his work on A Sorcerer's Coming as soon as possible. Later, the writer Vladimir Porudominsky noted that "Maximov was probably the most peasant artist of all the Peredvizhniks".

While working on the painting, Maximov often consulted with the peasants and took their criticism into account. The artist Ilya Repin wrote that Vasily Maximovich did not consider his painting finished "until it was completely approved" by the peasants. As an example, Repin quoted a dialogue in which Maximov said: "No, wait, wait, and this? — asks a cheeky neighbor. — Who? — "Groomsman" thought to plant here. — No, no, no, no, no, no, no, no, no, no, no, no, no, no, no, no, no, no, no! You should put an older man here, not a matchmaker. On the other hand, your boyfriend is young, inexperienced. And he's not a fighter either, he's a bit boring... Gli-ko, I'll show you my friend. Look, what a happy, broad face! They always take him to weddings: he's a joker, a merrymaker..." This is followed by general laughter, and "the beloved 'friend' expresses his full desire to sit for the picture".

Nevertheless, the work on A Sorcerer Comes to a Peasant Wedding progressed very slowly. There were periods when Maximov liked the state of the canvas — for example, in a letter to his wife on February 28, 1873, he wrote that "the current picture of my find from the technical side of the best of all now written" and "it may come out of it in fact a thing not good". At times, the artist was dissatisfied with the result of his work: in particular, in a letter to his wife on October 28, 1874, he wrote: "In the last week, my case goes particularly bad, forward not a step, what did not write, today all cleaned off with a knife, I want to do better ...", "... confidence with each failure is lost, ahead is almost the greatest difficulty, to manage the light is easier than with the shadow — now it is their turn". Be that as it may, in a letter to his wife dated December 11, 1874, written shortly before his return to St. Petersburg, Maximov was more optimistic: "If the character of the sorcerer and another, the middle one, with which I do not get along, I will arrive even earlier. I have only four characters to write, one of which is almost finished today — it is a balalaika player".

=== The 4th Travelling Exhibitions ===
The painting A Sorcerer Comes to a Peasant Wedding (under the shorter title A Sorcerer's Coming to a Wedding) was exhibited at the 4th Exhibition of the Society of Travelling Art Exhibitions ("Peredvizhniki"), which opened on February 27, 1875 in St. Petersburg and moved to Moscow in April of the same year. The canvas was well received by the public and critics. In particular, in an article by the art critic Adrian Prakhov, published in the magazine Pchela (No. 10 for 1875), it was written about Maximov's painting: "The characters are depicted on the highest degree of success. These simple people, for all the limitations of their existence, so human that involuntarily love them, move to them at the table and themselves happy to participate in this feast". Concluding the description of the painting, the author of the article noted that "its main dignity lies in the sincere, truthful attitude towards the depicted environment, or, better said, in the fact that it is conceived and created as if the popular imagination had created it".

In a letter to Pavel Tretyakov dated March 12, 1875, the artist Ivan Kramskoi wrote about the paintings presented at the exhibition: "Maximov has decided to sprinkle his sorcerer with snow in abundance, and this has only improved the matter considerably. In my opinion, he does not need to touch anything else, except for the balalaeshnika, yes, perhaps even (and that, by the way) the face of the owner, to make his face a little more visible". Directly from the exhibition, the canvas was bought from the author by Pavel Tretyakov — apparently this happened soon after Kramskoi's letter, because in a letter to Tretyakov dated March 22, the art critic Vladimir Stasov wrote: "I congratulate you on buying Maximov's painting, I think it is one of the most remarkable Russian paintings, especially in the choice of subject..." Approved of the purchase of the canvas and the artist Pavel Chistyakov, who wrote in a letter to Tretyakov on April 14, 1875: "A good picture you bought from Maximov ... I am happy for Maximov. He has entered the path of the artist..."

For some time after the sale, the painting remained in Maximov's possession. In a letter to Pavel Tretyakov of April 11, 1875, the artist wrote that he had "made the necessary corrections" at the end of the exhibition and described his actions in detail: "The albumen with which the painting was covered has been washed. The snow on the sorcerer's head was prescribed by me, the balalaika musician's head was made lighter, although I did not change the type, to change the type it was necessary to delay the painting for an indefinite period of time, which cannot be done at this time. When the picture was lightly rubbed with varnish, it was not even necessary to correct the head of the blond man that is in the middle of the picture..." Apparently, the artist's refinement satisfied the buyer, because in a letter to Tretyakov dated April 25, 1875, Maximov wrote: "Very glad that you found my picture satisfactory, although to be fair, there are places in it that my eye can hardly bear.

=== Next events ===
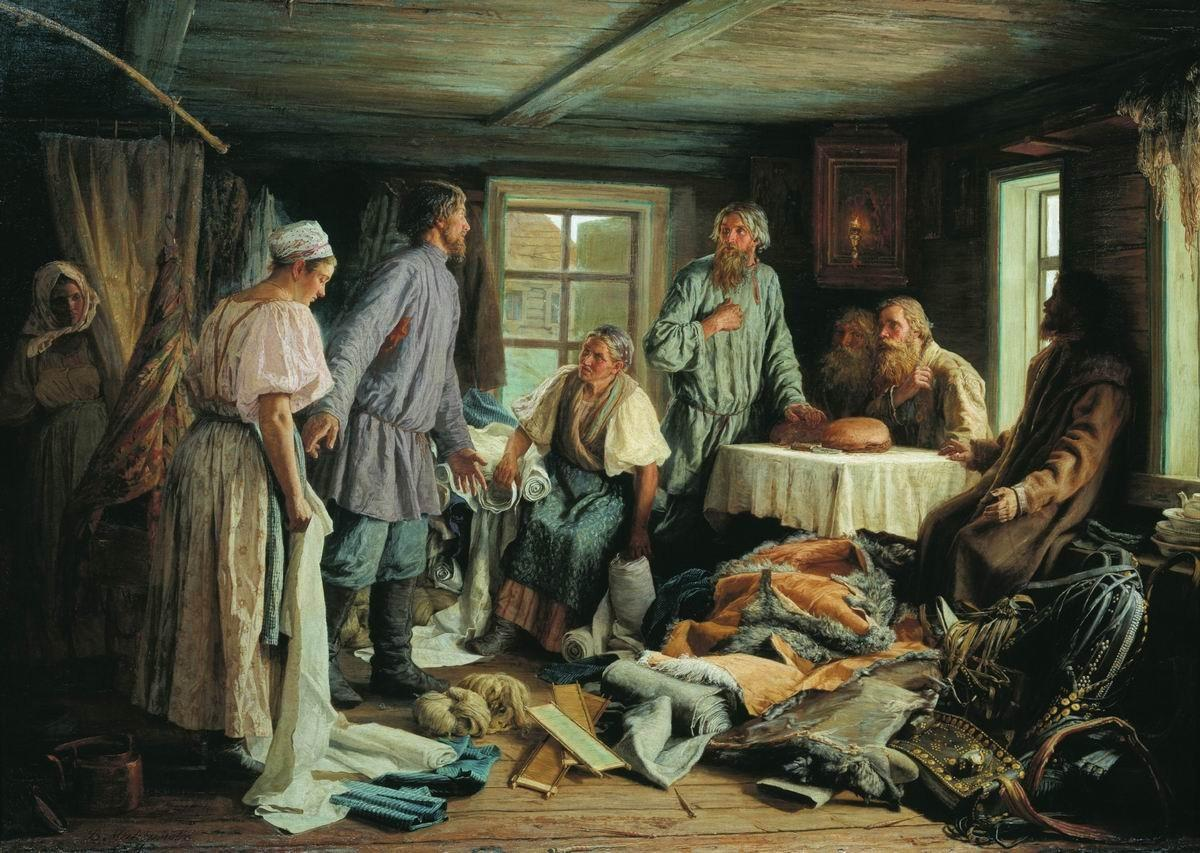
В. M. Maximov. Family Division (1876, State Tretyakov Gallery)

In 1878, two paintings by Vasily Maximov — A Sorcerer Comes to a Peasant Wedding and Family Separation (1876) were exhibited in the Russian Art section of the Paris World Exhibition. Shortly before, in St. Petersburg, the "Exhibition of Works of Art Submitted to the Paris World Exhibition" was held, where the first of these paintings was presented under the title A Sorcerer Comes to a Peasant Wedding. In the catalog of the Paris exhibition it appeared under the French title "Arrivée d'un devin à une noce villageoise" (V. M. Maximoff). The American sculptor William Story wrote in his report on the Paris exhibition that there was "great power and naturalness" in that painting. On November 4, 1878, the Academy of Arts awarded Maximov the title of Academician for his paintings A Sorcerer Comes to a Peasant Wedding and Family Separation.

The painting A Sorcerer Comes to a Peasant Wedding and Family Separation was also included in the exposition of the All-Russian Industrial and Art Exhibition of 1882, held in Moscow. In 1971-1972 the canvas took part in the exhibitions "Peredvizhniki in the State Tretyakov Gallery" (Moscow) and "Domestic Painting of the Peredvizhniki" (Leningrad, Kyiv, Minsk), which were held on the occasion of the 100th anniversary of the Society. In 1983-1984, the painting was exhibited at an exhibition in Moscow dedicated to the 225th anniversary of the Academy of Arts.

== Description ==
The plot of the painting A Sorcerer Comes to a Peasant Wedding was connected with the artist's childhood memories of his older brother's wedding: "The young people were standing in the icon corner, both very beautiful, everyone admired them ... Suddenly, a man with a dog entered and, without taking off his hat, stood on the threshold. All the guests looked at each other and whispered: "The sorcerer, the sorcerer has come. Then the uncle stood up and said loudly: "Man, come here, drink for the health of the boys and don't disturb the feast. They gave him a cup, put a coin in his hand, and the sorcerer left with his dog".

The painting shows an episode of a peasant wedding. In the red corner, near the icons, are the newlyweds, next to them are the bride's parents, the priest and other peasants. At the ends of the table are some groomsmen, their shoulders draped with sewn towels given to them by the bride. The joyful flow of the wedding feast is interrupted by the sudden appearance of the village sorcerer, covered in snow. The anxious state of those present is expressed by the movement of their figures — someone stands up, someone turns to the sorcerer, someone looks at the reaction of the newlyweds. The whole scene can be divided into two compositional centers — the group with the bride and groom, which includes other peasants gathered around the table, and the other group, which includes the sorcerer, the house owners offering him bread and salt, as well as the balalaika player and the girl to his right. The figures are arranged in such a way that the main characters are not overshadowed by the secondary ones, but are clearly visible (also with the help of suitable lighting) in a scene skillfully constructed by the artist.

Fragments of the painting A Sorcerer Comes to a Peasant Wedding

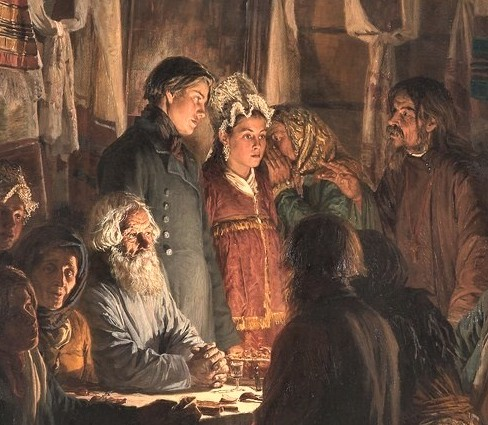
Young people, bride's parents and priest

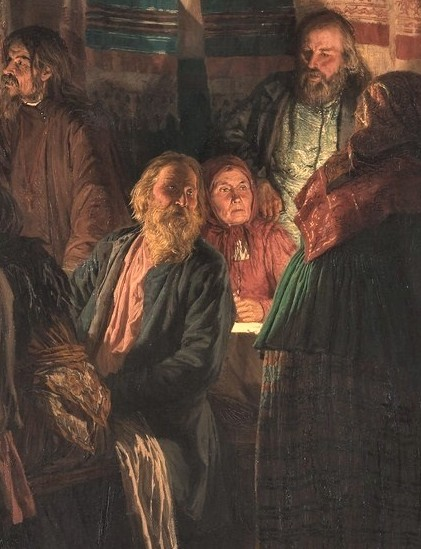
Peasants at the table

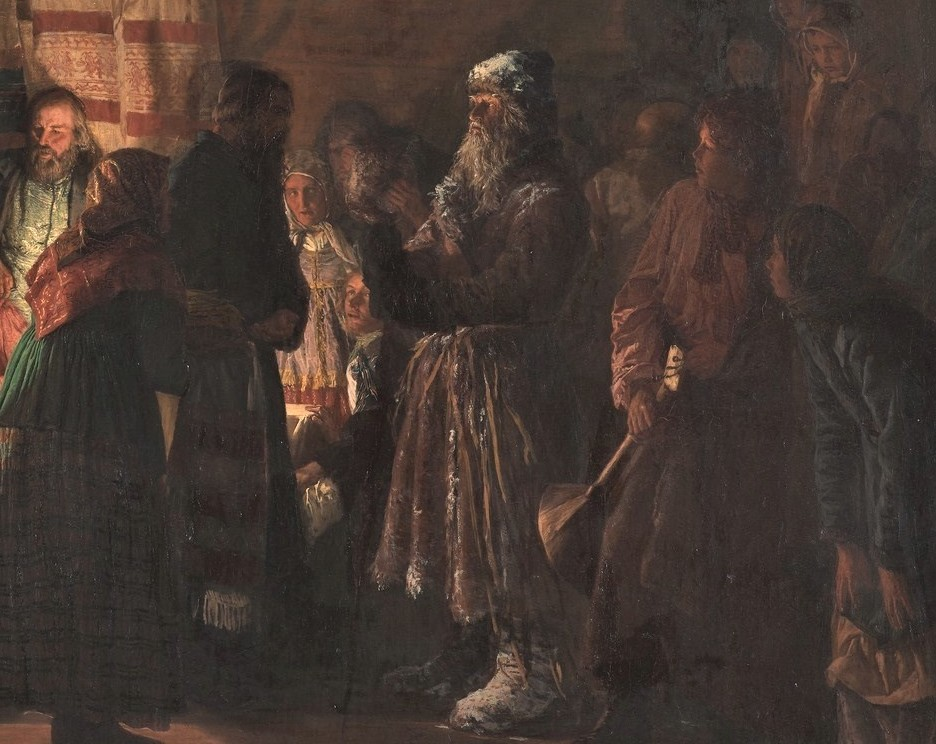
Sorcerer, groom's parents and others

The most intense fear of the sorcerer's arrival is expressed in the appearance of the bride, whose young face is "full of charm". She is dressed in a red wedding dress with yellow tassels, and on her head she wears a kokoshnik embroidered with pearls. Critic Adrian Prakhov wrote in 1875: "The bride, purely Russian and not even a beauty, so chaste, so virginal imbued and solemnity of the event, and a momentary anxiety that, looking at her, it is impossible not to love her". Her peculiar face, with slightly raised cheekbones, brings a special poetry and novelty to the picture. The art historian Alexander Zamoshkin called the picture of the bride "a true discovery of the artist". According to the art historian Galina Vasilieva-Shlyapina, "in the image of the main heroine of the painting, the artist asserts a new understanding of feminine beauty through an artistic interpretation of the national appearance and character". The bride tries to calm her mother by whispering comforting incantations. The groom looks calmer — he is listening with great attention to what the priest is telling him.

The old, experienced farmers were not particularly worried about the sorcerer's arrival, which did not come as a surprise to them: they know that they can buy him off with gifts, "bread and salt, money and wine are ready for him". The father of the bride —a grey-bearded peasant on the right of the young people— continues to sit quietly at the table, and the old man and the old woman opposite him do not even turn towards the uninvited guest. The characteristic features of the bride's father are "the peculiarly quiet wisdom of a Russian man and a calmness bordering on majesty". The girl in a beaded headdress standing behind him is apparently the bride's sister.

On the right side of the canvas is a sorcerer who has just entered the hut. He wears a fur coat and a hat, and his clothes are covered with snow. On the sorcerer's belt are tied bald-riches, with which, according to the belief, one can "bind evil". According to Adrian Prakhov, "even if you do not know that the new guest is a sorcerer, just from his face and clothes, from the general alarm accompanied by involuntary respect, you immediately feel that something important, mystical, supernatural has entered". The owners of the house, the groom's parents, meet the sorcerer: his mother brings him a korovai on a plate with a towel, and his father stands beside her.

Characters of the painting “A Sorcerer Comes to Peasant Wedding”

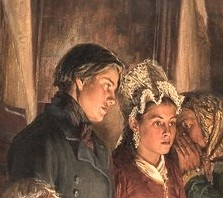
Bride and Groom

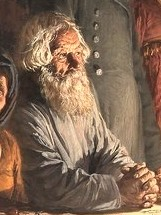
Father of the bride

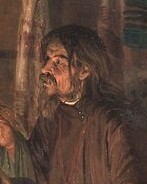
Priest

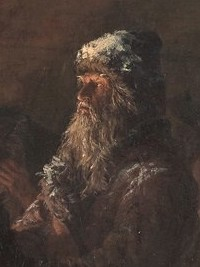
Sorcerer

Maximov work's researchers noted that in the painting A Sorcerer Comes to a Peasant Wedding almost all the faces were portraits of specific peasants. In a monograph on Maximov's life and work, the art historian Alexei Leonov wrote that the artist found his images in real life and probably "could tell about each of his heroes the whole story of his life, outline his character and actions". In particular, in a letter to his wife dated October 15, 1874, Maximov wrote: "...A considerable task to find sitters for two fathers and a magician. Stepan Lisn I will make a bridegroom father, and groom father write in other villages, yesterday started with Lobazin, but nowhere good, today scrubbed, and so constantly fiddling with the same case several times". In her memoirs Margarita Yamshchikova (known by pseudonym Al Altaev) said that she knew many sitters and sitters Maksimov; in particular, according to her, for the pop in "A Sorcerer Comes to a Peasant Wedding" posed hunter Kryachok.

The folklorist and ethnographer Erna Pomerantseva, in her article "The Artist and the Sorcerer" published in the journal Soviet Ethnography in 1973, gives a number of arguments in favor of the fact that the prototype of the sorcerer depicted in Maximov's painting was Grigory Semyonovich Shabara, whom the artist had known since the early 1870s. Maksimov's notes have survived, in which he described Shabara's appearance, as well as the history of their acquaintance and the content of their conversations. In particular, one of the episodes told by Shabara included a description of how he unexpectedly appeared at the wedding and how the groom's parents presented him with "honorable gifts: bread and salt on a sewn towel, a neckerchief, and, above all, a rublevka".

== Studies, sketches and repetitions ==
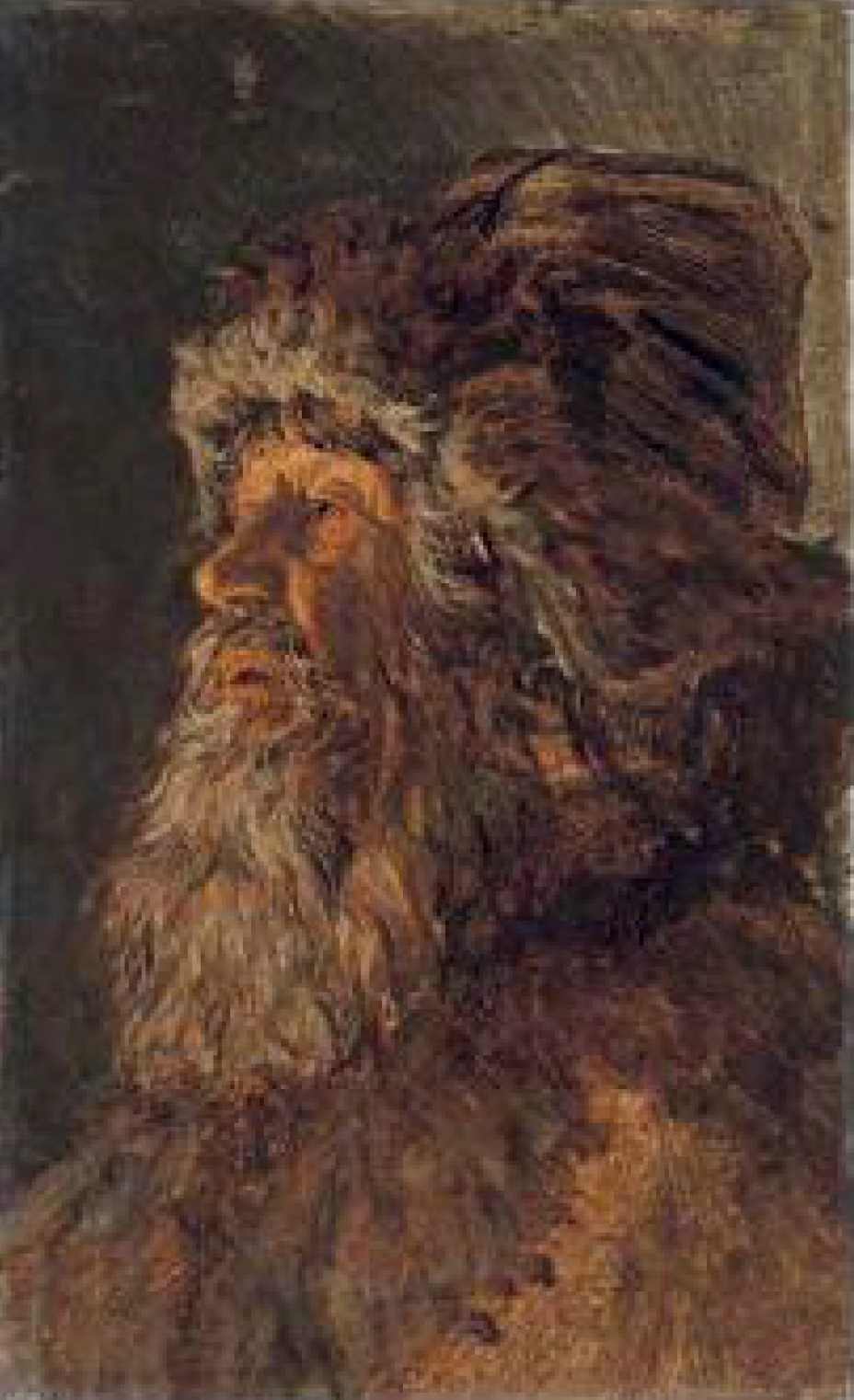
The Sorcerer's head

Two sketches of the same name for the painting A Sorcerer Comes to a Peasant Wedding, dated 1874, are kept in the State Tretyakov Gallery. One of them (oil on canvas, 43.7×67.5 cm, inv. no. 9370) was in the collection of I. E. Tsvetkov from the early 1890s and was acquired by the Tsvetkov Gallery in 1927 through the State Museum Fund. Another sketch (canvas, oil, 37.3×62 cm, inventory No. 11109) was bought from the author by I. S. Ostroukhov and came to the Ostroukhov Museum in 1929.

In the collection of the State Russian Museum there is a sketch The Sorcerer's Head (1875, canvas on cardboard, oil, 29,7×18 cm, inv. Zh-1290), which was given to the museum in 1912 by Emperor Nicholas II (the 1980 catalog states that this sketch came to the collection of L.A. Maximova). According to some sources, the sketch was acquired at a posthumous exhibition of Maximov's works held in 1912.

In addition, the Tretyakov Gallery has a graphic sketch of the painting A Sorcerer Comes to a Peasant Wedding (paper, sepia, graphite pencil, 21×33.5 cm, inv. 7292) and a graphic sketch Sorcerer (paper, sepia, graphite pencil, inv. 7281).

Maximov also made two graphic repetitions of the painting, which are in the collection of the Tretyakov Gallery: a sepia (1875, 41.2×60 cm) and a drawing in ink and pen for the illustrated catalog of the 1882 exhibition (25.5 × 41.5 cm, inv. 7283). Subsequently, the artist painted several author's repetitions of the painting, one of which (canvas, oil, 33.5×52.5 cm, 1895) is in the State Museum-Reserve "Zaraisky Kremlin".

Sketches of the painting “A Sorcerer Comes to a Peasant Wedding&amp;amp;quot;

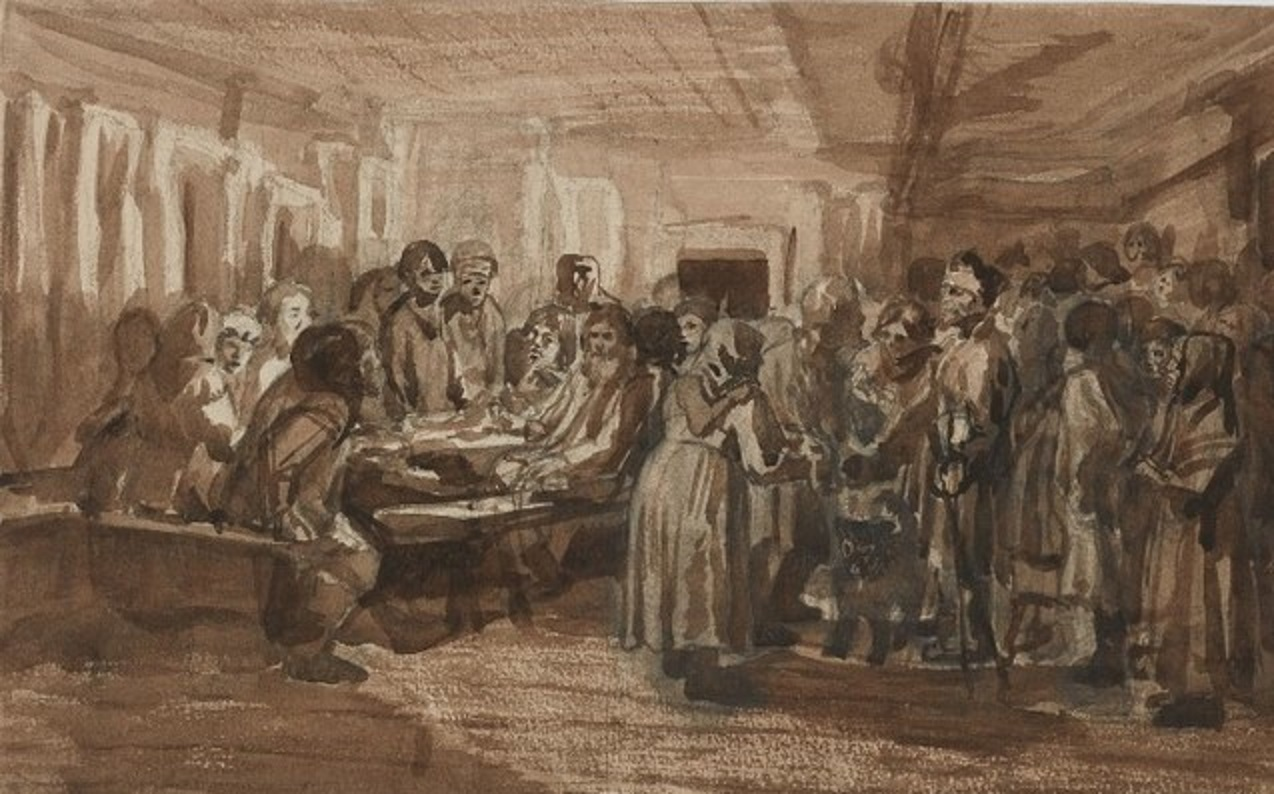
A Sorcerer Comes to a Peasant Wedding (sketch, 1870s, State Tretyakov Gallery, Inventory No. 7292)

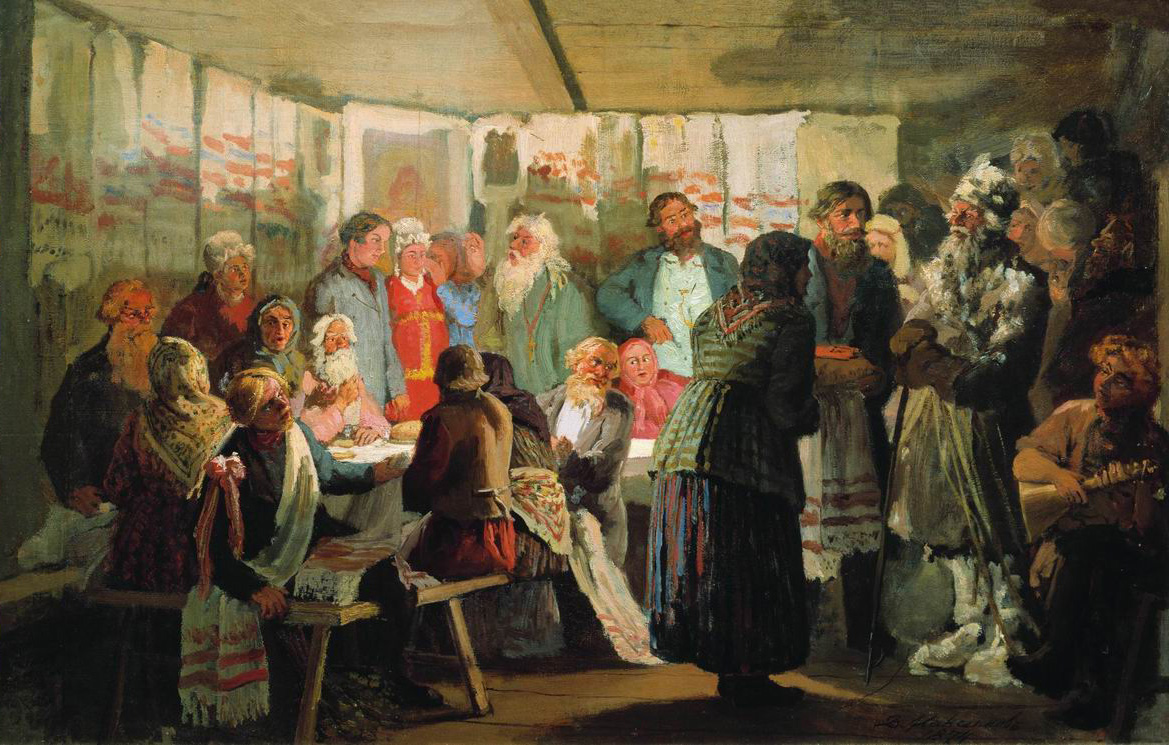
A Sorcerer Comes to a Peasant Wedding (sketch, 1874, State Tretyakov Gallery, Inventory No. 9370)

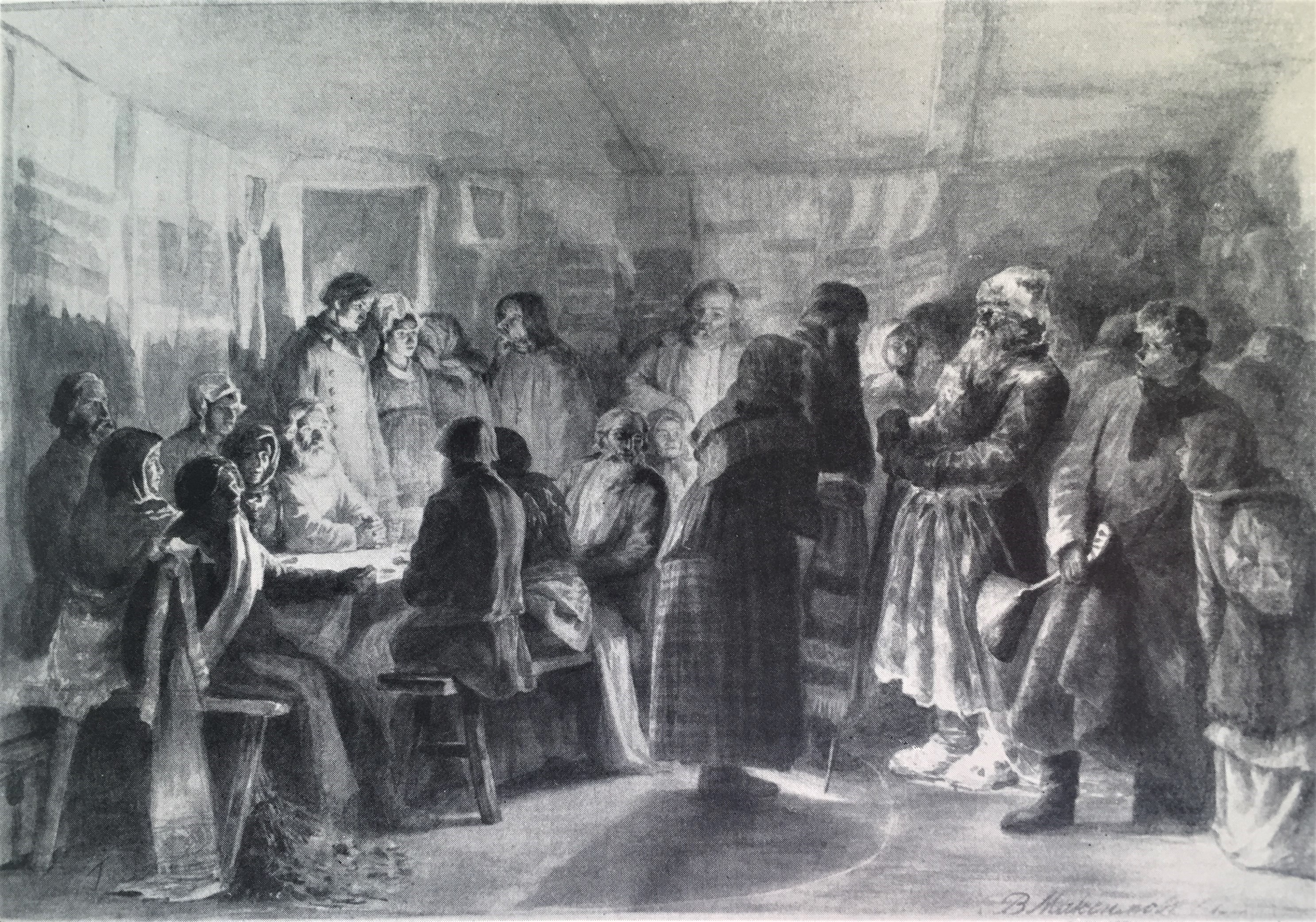
A Sorcerer Comes to a Peasant Wedding (sketch, 1874, State Tretyakov Gallery, Inventory No. 11109)

== Critics ==
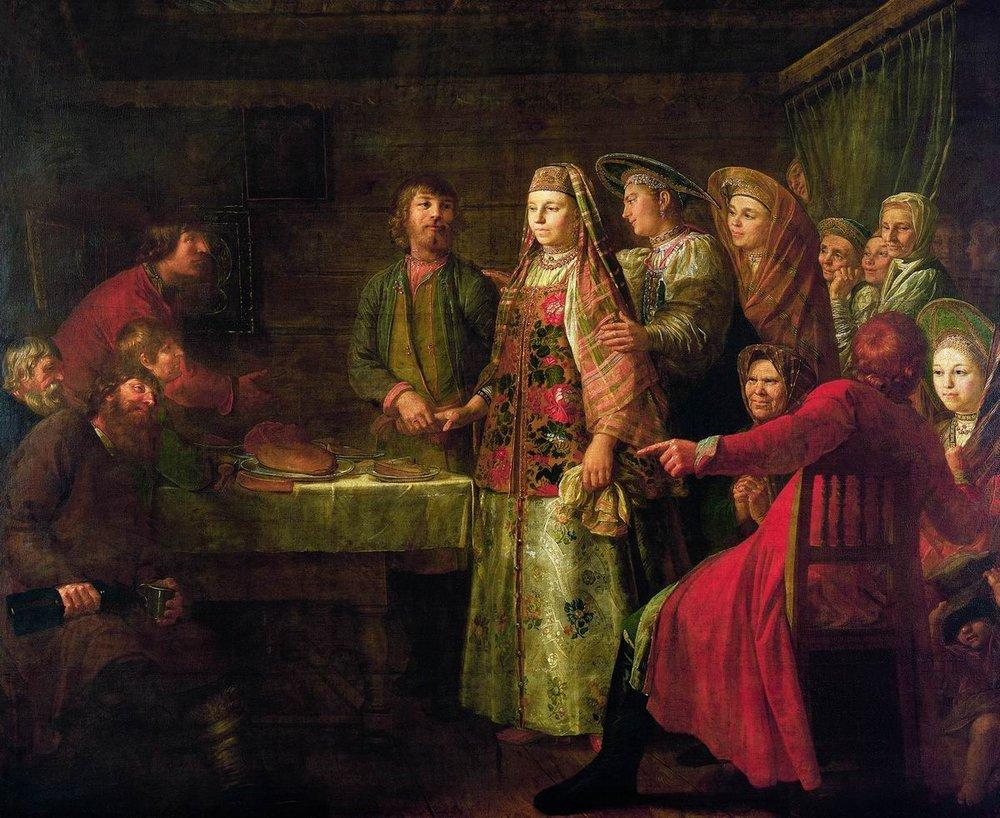
М. Shibanov. Celebration of the wedding contract (1777, State Tretyakov Gallery)

In an article published in 1883, "Twenty-Five Years of Russian Art," art critic Vladimir Stasov noted that Vasily Maximov "painted many small pictures of peasant and bourgeois life. However, according to Stasov, "the best, the most important and the most significant thing he did in his life is the painting 'A Sorcerer Comes to a Peasant Wedding'. In the critic's opinion, A Sorcerer Comes to a Peasant Wedding is a profound and talented picture of "village faith and that spiritual household which the generations of the century live at home, in distant villages". Commenting on the artist's later works, Stasov wrote that "after this wonderful picture (unfortunately, a little black in color), Maximov has not written anything else equal to it in breadth and richness of truthfulness and humor".

The artist and critic Alexander Benois, in his book History of Russian Painting in the 19th сentury, the first edition of which was published in 1902, wrote that in the mid-1870s, when Maximov's paintings "A Sorcerer Comes to a Peasant Wedding" and "The Separation of Families" appeared, "his success was enormous" and the critics put him "next to the most brilliant of the travelling painters". According to Benois, Maximov's everyday works "depict reality almost in its purest form" and practically do not impose the artist's personal opinion on the viewer, while complex scenes "have the character not of random photographic images, but of typical everyday documents".

Art historian Alexander Zamoshkin noted that Maximov "reached his creative peak" in the painting "A Sorcerer Comes to a Peasant Wedding", and wrote that the peasant images created by the artist were "integral and poetic; they are images of 'pure type', not yet touched by the process of 'peasantization'". Zamoshkin noted that "in the exceptional understanding of peasant life and types" "A Sorcerer Comes to a Peasant Wedding" is close to Mikhail Shibanov's canvas "Celebration of the Marriage Contract" (1777, State Tretyakov Gallery) painted a century earlier — in both works "true Great Russian types are marked by originality, character and expressiveness".

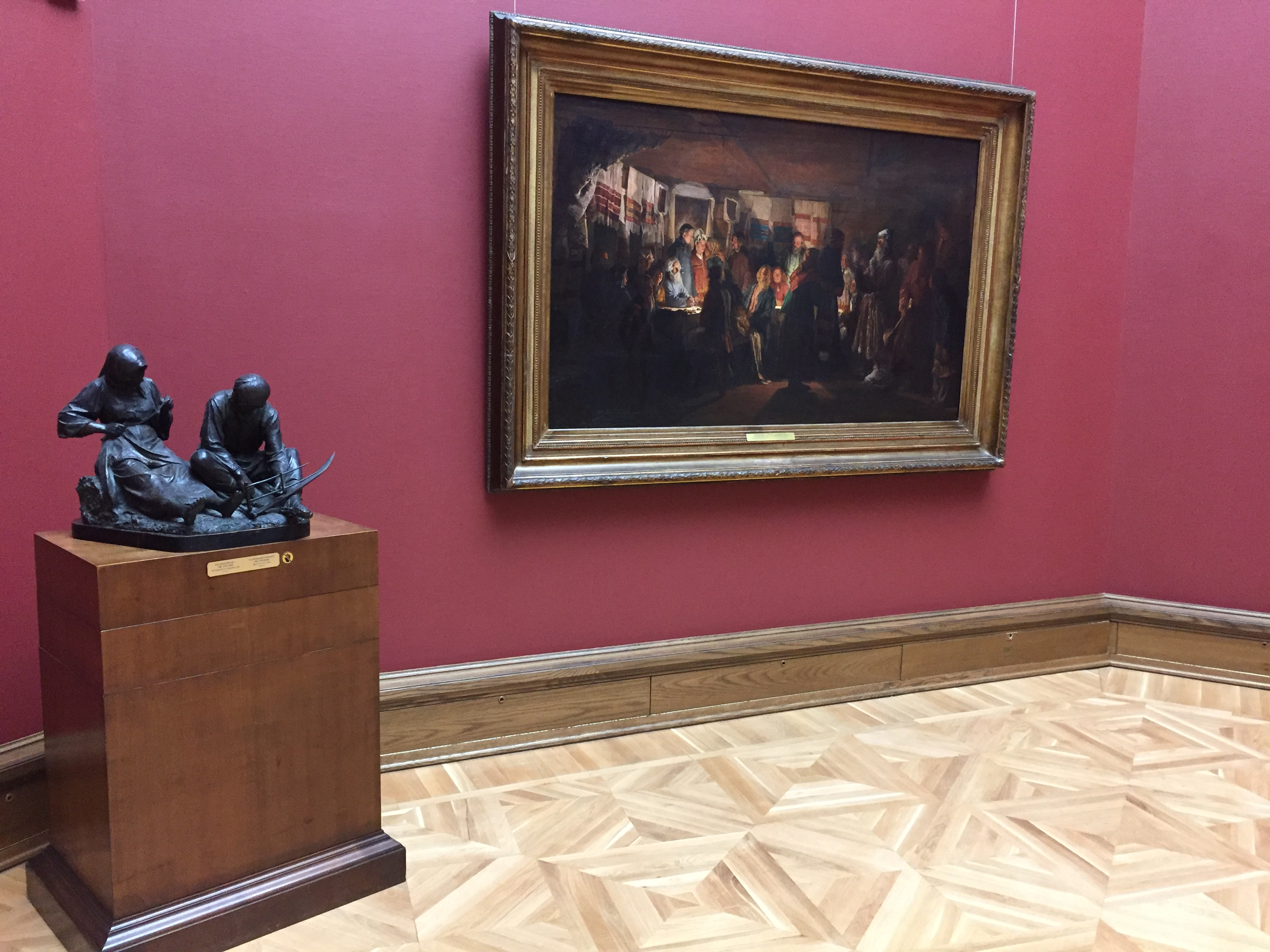
Painting “A Sorcerer Comes to a Peasant Wedding” in the State Tretyakov Gallery.

In a monograph on Maximov's work, art historian Alexei Leonov wrote that the power of the painting "A Sorcerer Comes to a Peasant Wedding" lies "in its idea, in showing the dignity and depth of feelings of ordinary people, in the love for people that the artist put into it". According to Leonov, in this work by Maximov, in the unity of content and form, "the primacy remains on the side of the content", thanks to which the power of the canvas' impact on the viewer "remained unsurpassed". Leonov, noting the expressiveness, truthfulness and soulfulness of the type of the picture, wrote that in it the artist depicts "a piece of village life, a modest household of villagers, their simple spiritual world with love and warmth of feeling".

The ethnographer Sergei Tokarev, researching the beliefs of East Slavic peoples associated with creatures and objects of the real world, noted that in a remarkable Maximov's painting "A Sorcerer Comes to a Village Wedding" the artist "managed to convey extremely expressively and aptly those mixed feelings of superstitious fear, anxiety in the face of some alien power, but at the same time and reverence, which causes the whole personality of the old sorcerer, suddenly appeared among the wedding festivities..."

Art historian Dmitry Sarabianov considered the painting "A Sorcerer Comes to Peasant Wedding" to be Maximov's best work, noting that this canvas brought its author universal fame and placed him "in the first ranks of Russian realist painters". According to Sarabianov, in this painting Maximov "recreates with great poetic feeling the ancient customs of the patriarchal village, conveys the national identity of the Russian peasantry", and depicts the peasants on the canvas as people of "great charm and beauty" with sincere feelings, characters, and habits.

== Bibliography ==
- Алдонина, Р. П. (2007). Василий Максимов. Мастера живописи (in Russian). М.: Белый город. p. 48. ISBN 978-5-7793-1220-2.
- Алтаев Ал., Ямщикова М. В. (1957). Памятные встречи. Серия литературных мемуаров (in Russian). М.: Государственное издательство художественной литературы. p. 424.
- Бенуа, А. Н. (1996). История русской живописи в XIX веке (in Russian). М.: Республика. p. 448. ISBN 5-250-02524-2.
- Васильева-Шляпина, Г. Л. (2002). Сибирские красавицы В. Сурикова (in Russian). Спб.: Иван Фёдоров. p. 352.
- Гомберг-Вержбинская, Э. П. (1970). Передвижники (in Russian). Л.: Искусство. p. 236.
- Горина Т. Н., Прытков В. А. (1964). Горина Т. Н. (ed.). Крестьянская тема в жанровой живописи передвижников. Русская жанровая живопись XIX — начала XX века (in Russian). М.: Искусство. pp. 167–206.
- Замошкин А. И. (1950). В. М. Максимов. Очерки по истории русской живописи второй половины XIX века (in Russian). М.: Издательство Государственной Третьяковской галереи. p. 48.
- Иванова, Т. Г. (2018). Василий Максимович Максимов — художник и собиратель фольклорно-этнографических материалов (PDF) (in Russian). Vol. 19. Традиционная культура. pp. 19–27.
- Иванова, Т. Г. (2020). Колдун в изобразительном искусстве конца XIX — начала XX века (этнографический и историко-мифологический дискурсы) (PDF) (in Russian). Vol. 42. Учёные записки Петрозаводского государственного университета. pp. 76–84.
- Лазуко, А. К. (1982). Василий Максимов. Массовая библиотека по искусству (in Russian). Vol. 80. Л.: Художник РСФСР. p. 80.
- Леонов, А. И. (1951). Василий Максимов. Жизнь и творчество (in Russian). М.: Искусство. p. 347.
- Метёлкина, А. Г. (2008). Петинова Е. Ф. (ed.). Максимов Василий Максимович (in Russian). М.: Азбука-Классика. pp. 404–406. ISBN 978-5-91181-923-1.
- Померанцева, Э. В. (1973). Художник и колдун (PDF). Советская этнография (in Russian). М. pp. 137–145.
- Порудоминский, В. И. (1979). Первая Третьяковка. Библиотечная серия (in Russian). М.: Детская литература. p. 127.
- Прахов, А. В. (1875). Четвёртая передвижная выставка (in Russian). Vol. 1. Пчела. Русская иллюстрация. pp. 121–126.
- Репин, И. Е. (1960). Чуковский К. И. (ed.). Далёкое близкое (in Russian). Vol. 1. Издательство Академии художеств СССР. p. 510.
- Рогинская, Ф. С. (1989). Товарищество передвижных художественных выставок (in Russian). М.: Искусство. p. 430.
- Сарабьянов, Д. В. (1955). Народно-освободительные идеи русской живописи второй половины XIX века (in Russian). М.: Искусство. p. 300.
- Стасов, В. В. (1950). Избранное: живопись, скульптура, графика. Русское искусство (in Russian). Vol. 1. М.: Искусство.
- Токарев, С. А. (2012). Религиозные верования восточнославянских народов XIX — начала XX века (in Russian). Vol. 1. М.: Книжный дом «Либроком». ISBN 978-5-397-02283-5.
- Чижмак, М. С. (2015). Дивная повесть о минувшем. Картина В. М. Максимова "Всё в прошлом" (in Russian). М.: Русское искусство. pp. 72–75.
- Чистяков, П. П. (1952). Белютин Э. М., Молева Н. М. (ed.). Письма, записки, воспоминания (in Russian). М.: Искусство. p. 592.
- В. Максимов. 50 художников — шедевры русской живописи (in Russian). Vol. 47. М.: Де Агостини. 2011. p. 32.
- Государственная Третьяковская галерея — каталог собрания / Я. В. Брук, Л. И. Иовлева. — М.: Красная площадь, 2001. — V. 4: Живопись второй половины XIX века, book 1, А—М. — 528 p. — ISBN 5-900743-56-X.
- Государственный Русский музей — Живопись, XVIII — начало XX века (каталог). — Л.: Аврора и Искусство, 1980. — 448 с.
- Государственный Русский музей — каталог собрания / Г. Н. Голдовский, В. А. Леняшин. — СПб.: Palace Editions, 2016. — V. 6: Живопись второй половины XIX века (К—М). — 176 p. — ISBN 978-5-93332-565-9.
- Иллюстрированный каталог Художественного отдела Всероссийской выставки в Москве, 1882 г. / Н. П. Собко. — СПб.: Издатель М. П. Боткин, 1882. — 304 p.
- Искусство. Современная иллюстрированная энциклопедия / А. П. Горкин (гл. ред.). — М.: Росмэн, 2007. — V. 3 (Л—П). — 296 p. — ISBN 978-5-353-02798-0.
- Переписка И. Н. Крамского: И. Н. Крамской и П. М. Третьяков, 1869—1887 / С. Н. Гольдштейн. — М.: Искусство, 1953. — 458 p.
- Товарищество передвижных художественных выставок. Письма, документы. 1869—1899 / В. В. Андреева, М. В. Астафьева, С. Н. Гольдштейн, Н. Л. Приймак. — М.: Искусство, 1987. — 668 p.
- Story, W. W. (1880). Fine Arts. Reports of the United States Commissioners to the Paris Universal Exposition. Vol. II. Washington: Government Printing Office. pp. 1–180.
- Catalogue de la section russe à l'Exposition universelle de Paris. — Paris: Lahure, 1878. — 248 p.
