= Vassily Maximov =

Russian painter (1844–1911)

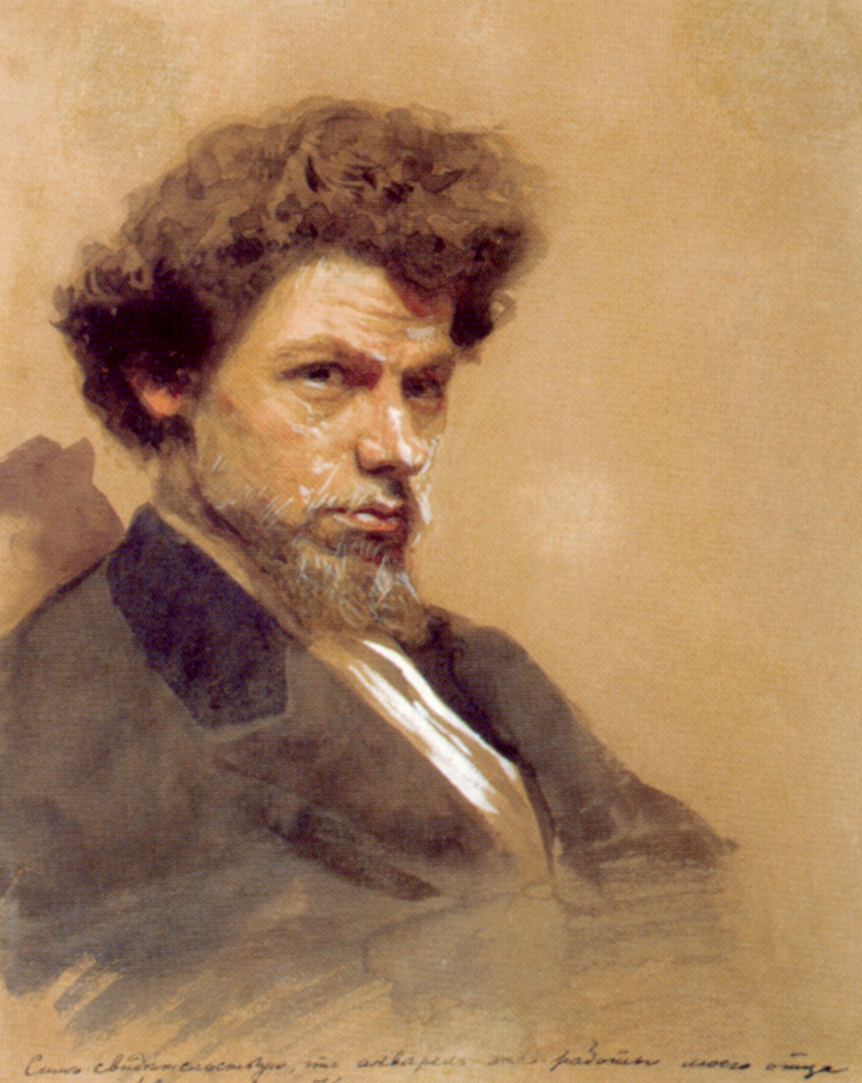
- Portrait by Ivan Kramskoi (1878)
- Born: January 17, 1844; Lopino, Novoladozhsky Uyezd, Russia
- Died: November 18, 1911 (aged 67); Saint Petersburg, Russia
- Education: Member Academy of Arts (1878)
- Alma mater: Imperial Academy of Arts (1866)
- Known for: Painting
- Style: Realism
- Movement: Peredvizhniki

Vassily Maximovich Maximov (Russian: Васи́лий Максимо́вич Макси́мов; 29 January [O.S. 17 January] 1844 – 1 December [O.S. 18 November] 1911) was a Russian painter, a prominent member of the Peredvizhniki group.

== Biography ==
Maximov was born to a peasant family in the village of Lopino in the Saint Petersburg Governorate, near Novaya Ladoga. He became an orphan early and worked for an Iconpainting shop, where he first learned to paint. In 1863 he entered the Imperial Academy of Arts and in 1864 he became a member of an Artel of Artists created by P.N. Krestonovtsev by the example of Ivan Kramskoi. The artel existed only one year and was then disbanded. Maximov painted the Sick Child (1864) at that time, when received a Gold Medal of the Academia.

He completed all the courses of the Academy in three years. In 1865 he (like the group of fourteen led by Ivan Kramskoi had done earlier) refused to take part in the competitions for the Major Gold Medal by Academia. He argued that he did not need to study abroad (that was a part of the prize) but rather would study the Russian village. Indeed, after graduation from the Academia he moved to the village of Shubino, in the gubernia of Tver, where he painted the peasant life, earning money as a painting teacher of the Princes Golenischev-Kutuzov (descendants of Mikhail Illarionovich Kutuzov).

His painting Grandmother's tales (1867) was shown at an exhibition of the Imperial Society for the Encouragement of the Arts, where it won a prize and was bought by Pavel Tretyakov. In 1872 he was admitted to the Peredvizhniki group, and soon became one of its most prominent and rigorous members. Ilya Yefimovich Repin described Maximov as "the most uncrushable stone in the foundation of peredvizhnechestvo". Maximov painted many paintings of the peasant life.

In the last twenty years of his life, realism paintings fell out of fashion. Maximov still painted almost exclusively scenes of the peasant lives that had almost no buyers. The artist lived a life full of poverty and illnesses. He died in Saint Petersburg.

== Selected works ==
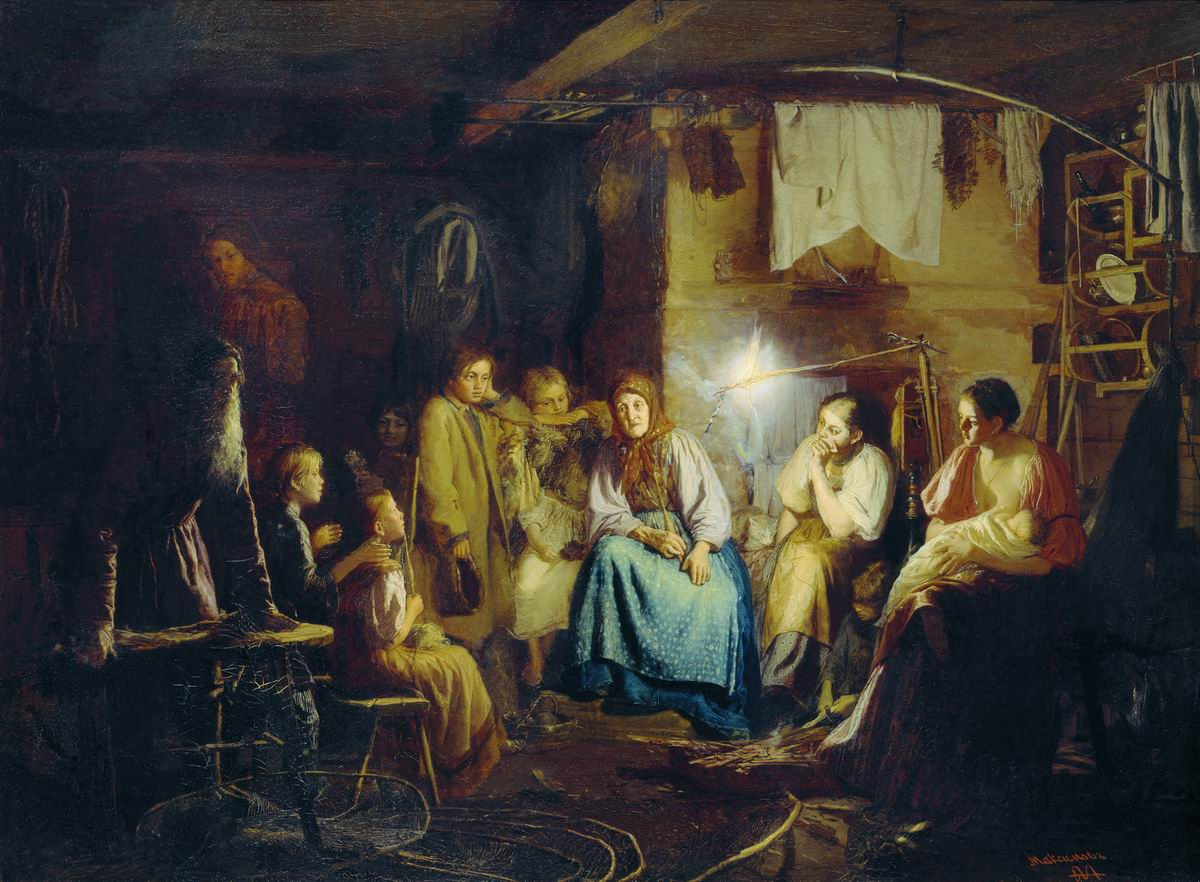
Grandma's Fairy Tales, 1867

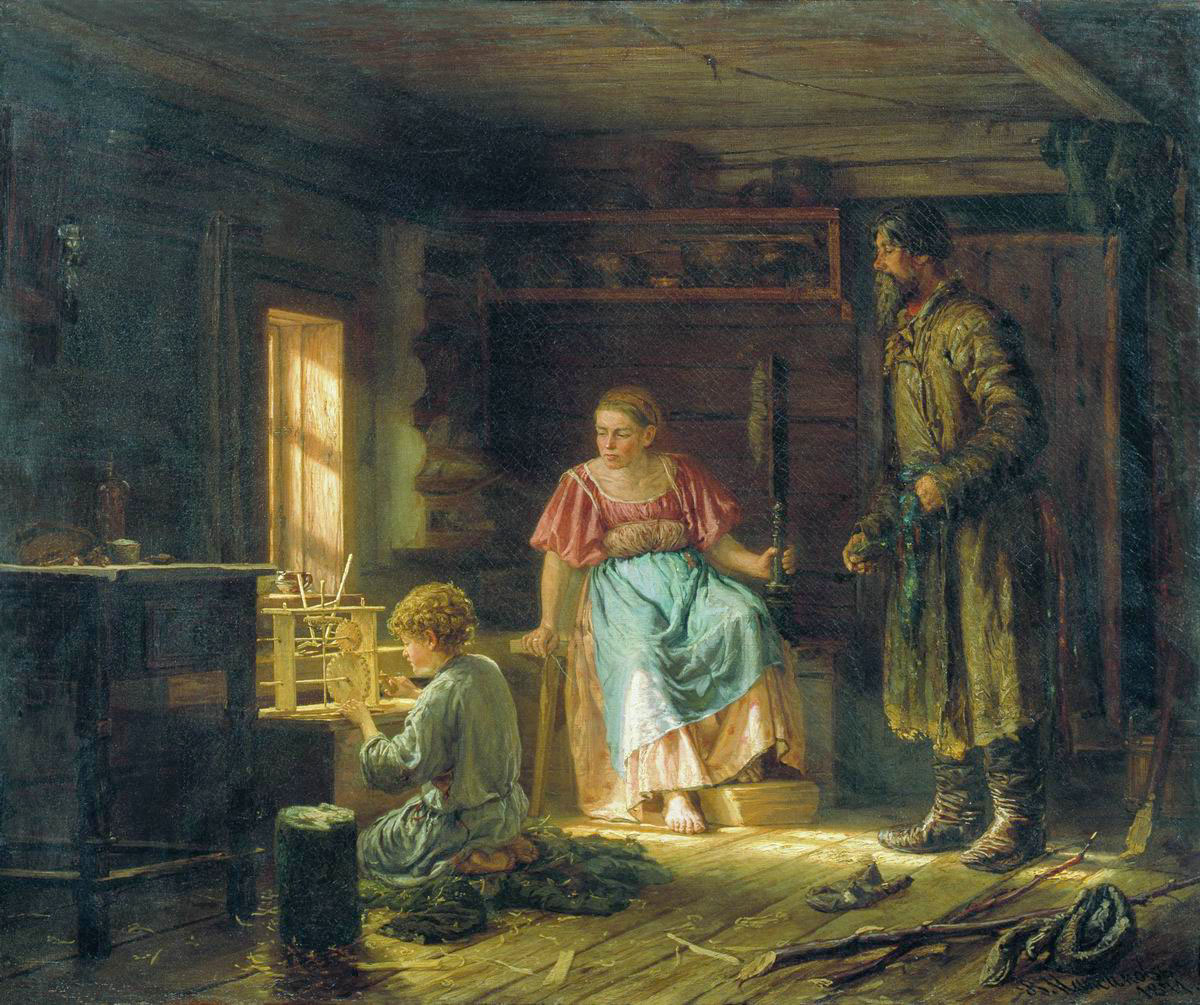
Boy-engineer, 1871

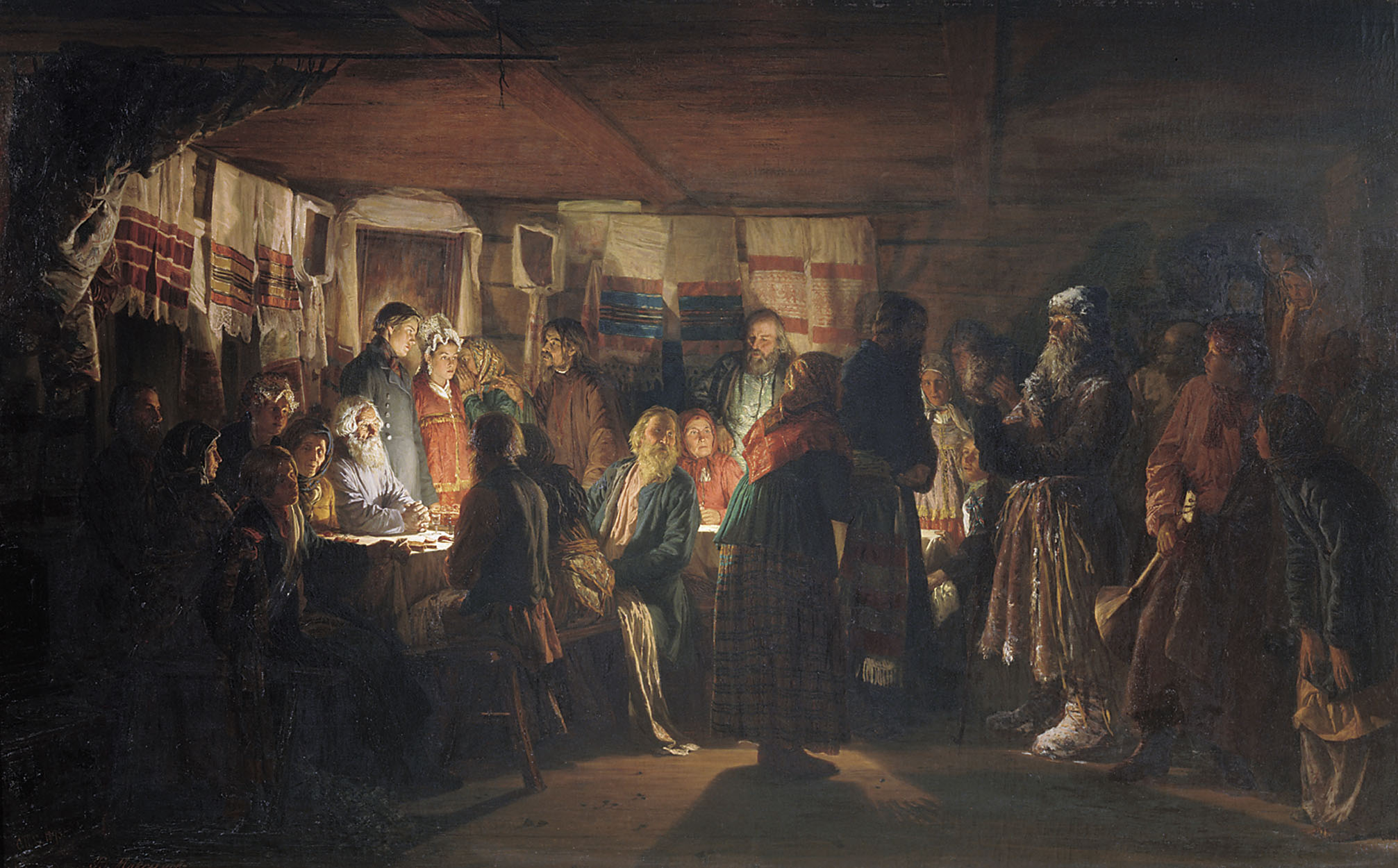
A Sorcerer Comes to a Peasant Wedding, 1875

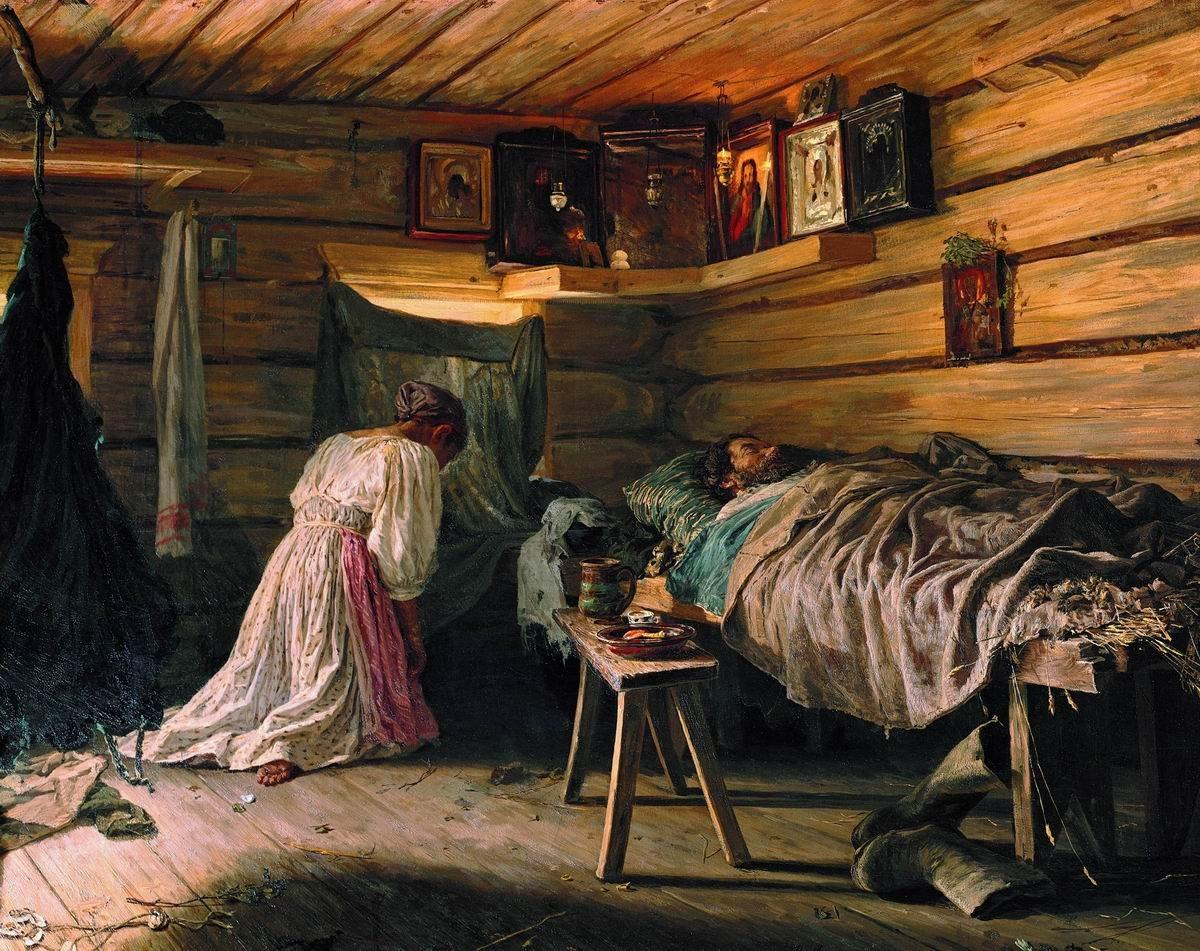
Sick husband, 1881

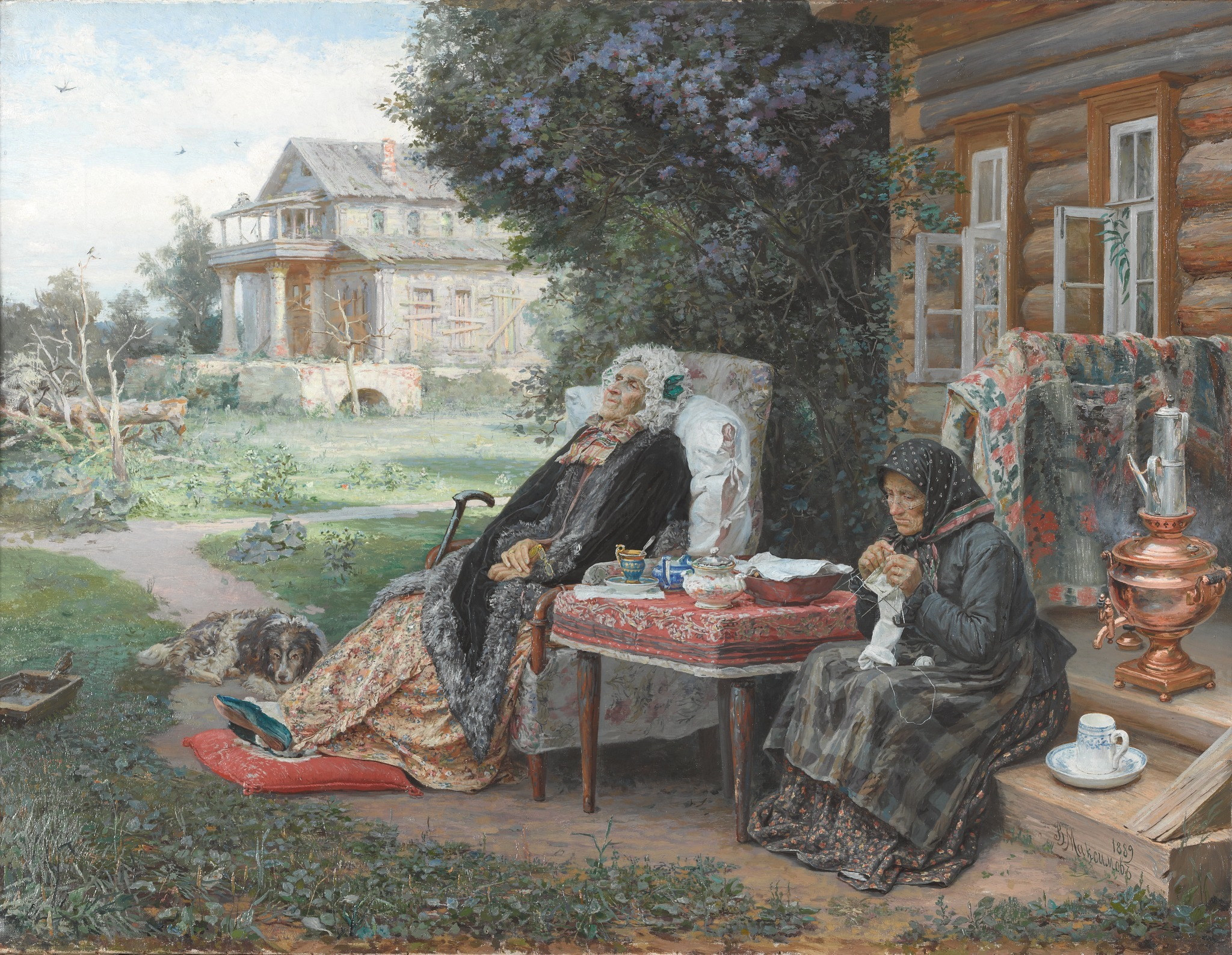
Everything is in the past, 1889
