= Grandma's Fairy Tales =

Painting by Russian artist Vassily Maximov

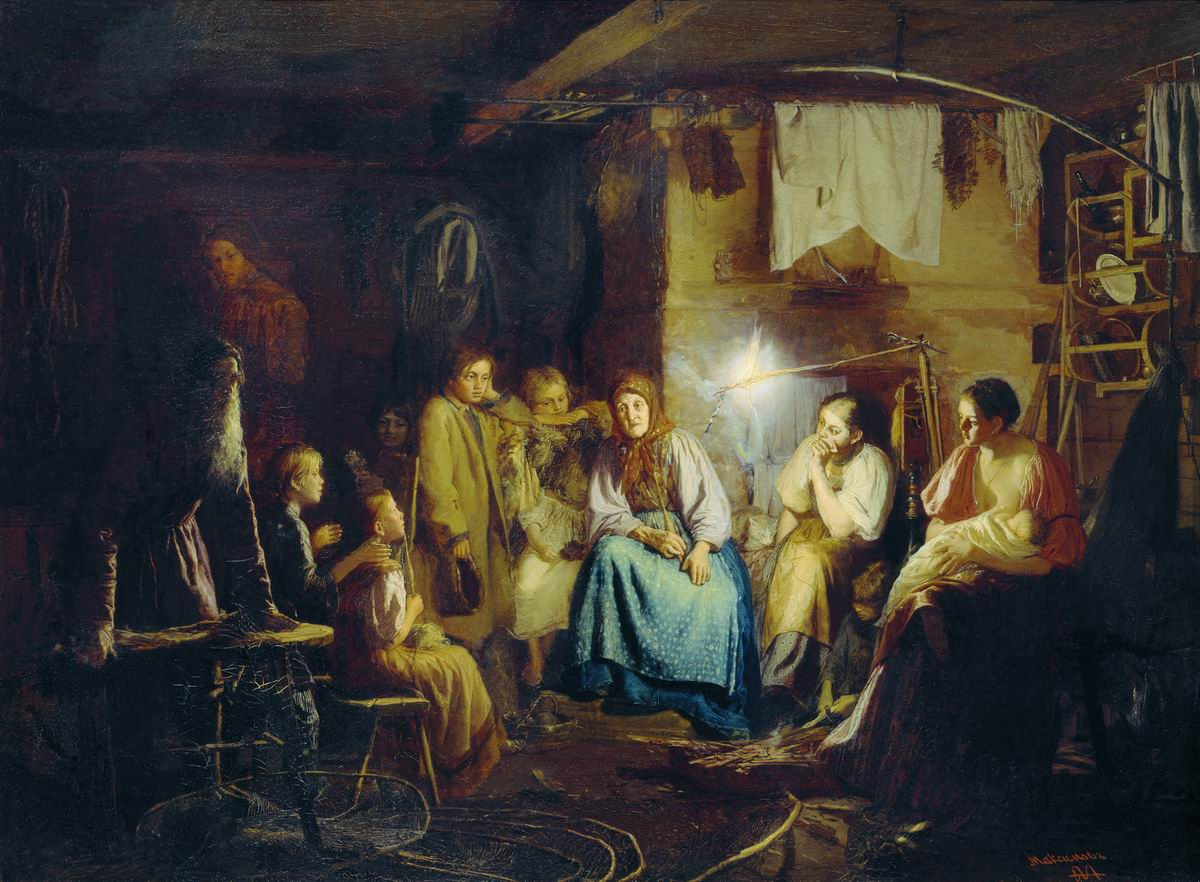
- Artist: Vassily Maximov
- Year: 1867
- Medium: Oil on canvas
- Dimensions: 67 cm × 92 cm (26 in × 36 in)
- Location: Tretyakov Gallery, Moscow

Grandma's Fairy Tales is a painting by Russian artist Vassily Maximov, completed in 1867. It is held in the State Tretyakov Gallery (Inventory No. 584). The dimensions of the canvas are 67 × 92 cm (68 × 92.6 cm according to other sources). The painting depicts a large peasant family gathered in a village hut on a winter's evening, illuminated by the glow of a luchina, as adults and children listen with rapt attention to a fairy tale being told by their grandmother.

Maximov worked on the painting Grandma's Fairy Tales in 1866-1867 and finished it on 27 November 1867. (Note: The Julian calendar ("old style") is used to date events that took place in the Russian Empire.) Between the end of 1867 and the beginning of 1868, the painting, under the title Old Woman Telling Fairy Tales on a Winter's Evening, was presented at the exhibition of the Society for the Encouragement of Artists, held in St. Petersburg. Maximov's work was well received and awarded its first prize. In December 1867, the artist Apolinary Horawski noted in his critique that Grandma's Fairy Tales was "something that really deserved special attention" and had "special authority." The canvas was purchased by Pavel Tretyakov directly from the exhibition. In 1870, Maximov was awarded the title of class artist of the 1st degree for his paintings Grandma's Fairy Tales, Dream of the Future (1868), Gathering for a Walk (1869) and Old Woman (1869).

Art historian Alexander Zamoshkin wrote that in the painting Grandma's Fairy Tales Maximov "created, avoiding any sentimentality, deeply vital images," and that his pictures of peasant children were particularly heartfelt. The art historian Dmitri Sarabianov noted that in this work "for the first time that poetic note sounded," which "will be particularly audible" in Maximov's later canvas A Sorcerer Comes to a Peasant Wedding (1875), while in Grandma's Fairy Tales "the whole scene as a whole focuses on the traditional, patriarchal and therefore beautiful motif."

== History ==
=== Background and creation ===
Vassily Maximov was born into a peasant family in the village of Lopino, Novoladozhsky Uyezd, Saint Petersburg Governorate. He lost his parents at an early age; his father, Maxim Terentyevich, died when Vassily was six years old, and his mother, Anastasia Vasilyevna, died when he was ten. Vassily Maximov loved his mother very much and retained warm feelings for her throughout his life. Anastasia Vasilyevna was a hardworking, responsive and prudent woman. She was also an excellent storyteller of "fairy tales, stories and tall tales". She often recounted her impressions of her travels to Moscow and Kyiv, as well as to the Solovetsky Monastery and other places.

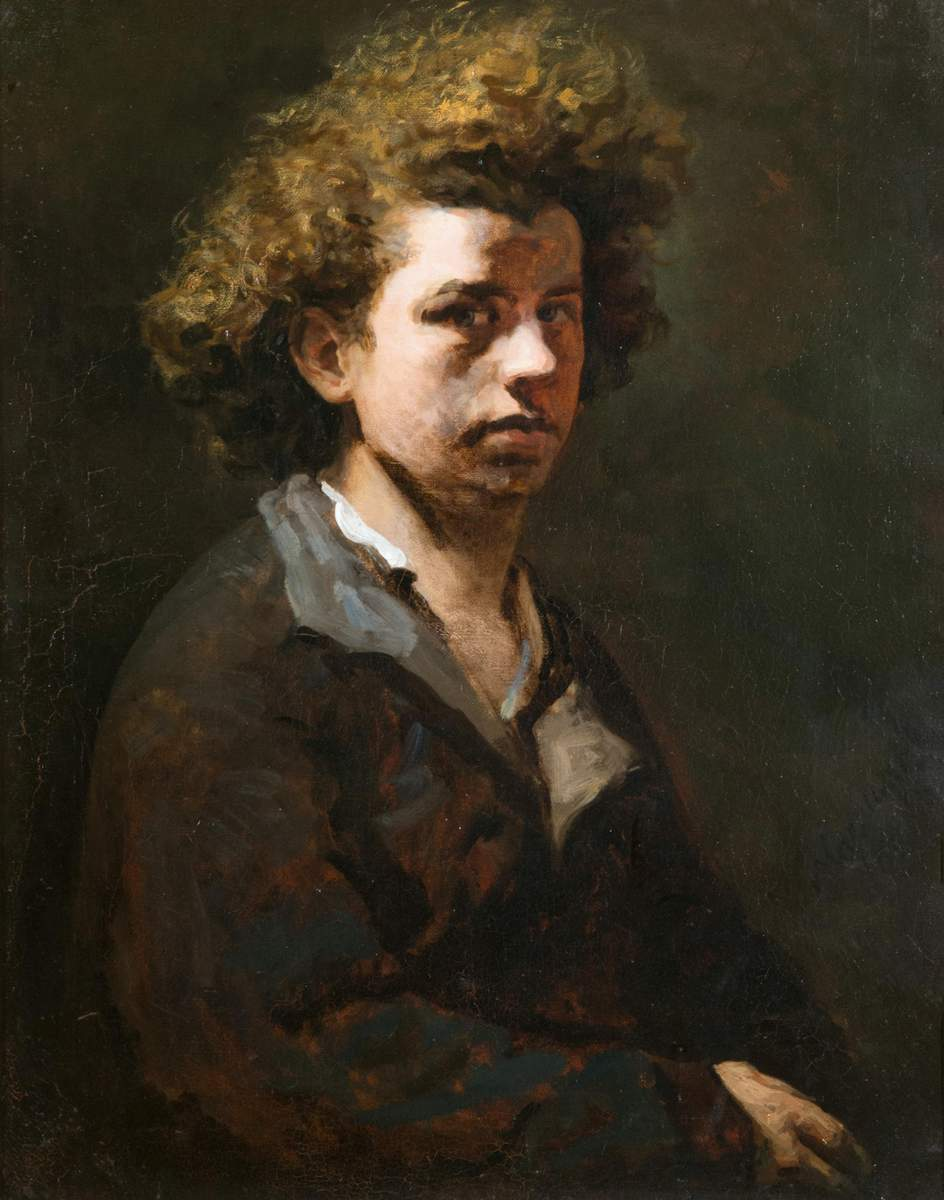
Vassily Maximov. Self-portrait (1863, State Russian Museum)

From 1862 onwards, Maximov studied at the Academy of Arts, initially as a free student and subsequently, from 1863 to 1866, in the class of historical painting, where his tutors were Fyodor Bruni, Timofey Neff, Alexey Markov and Pyotr Shamshin. During his studies at the Academy, Maximov received three silver medals for studies and drawings from life, and in 1864 he was awarded a small gold medal for his painting Sick Child (Village Scene). Having studied alongside such famous future artists as Ilya Repin, Vasily Polenov and Konstantin Savitsky, Maximov was (according to Repin) "one of the first of the very top ten." Having refused to participate in the competition for the big gold medal, he left the Academy in 1866 with a certificate of a class artist of the 3rd degree.

In the same year, 1866, the artist moved to the village of Shubino, Korchevskoy Uyezd, Tver Governorate, where he worked as an art teacher at the estate of the Counts Golenishchev-Kutuzov. During his stay in Shubino, the artist conceived the themes of his future paintings, including Grandma's Fairy Tales, Family Section and All in the past. In particular, it was there that the artist created the drawing entitled Winter Evening in the Village (now in the State Russian Museum). This drawing is regarded as the "original idea" for the painting Grandma's Fairy Tales. Upon his return to St. Petersburg, Maximov informed his acquaintance, the artist Arseny Shurygin, with whom he had leased a room, that he would not stay in the capital for long, but would go "to the village to paint a painting that he had conceived this summer." He was going to work on his first complex composition - Grandma's Fairy Tales.

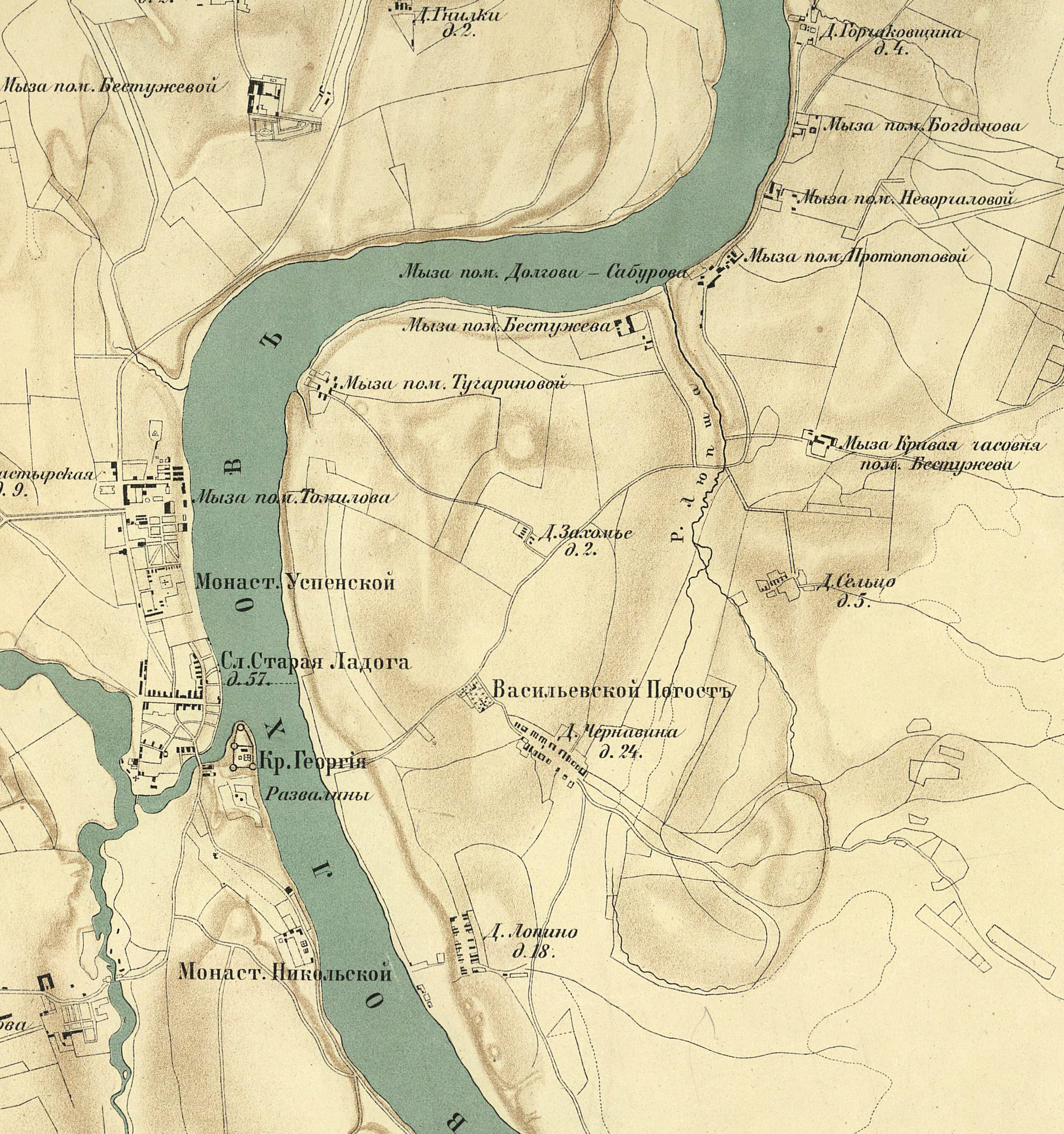
Map of the vicinity of Staraya Ladoga in the first half of the 19th century. The village of Lopino is located on the right bank of the Volkhov (at the bottom of the map). The Lubsha estate was also located on the right bank, at the confluence of the Lubsha River (on the map - Lupsha)

After a few days of packing, Maximov went to his home village of Lopino, where he settled with his older brother Alexei, who provided him with a separate hut. It was small, with a low ceiling, but with a large Russian stove. In his memoirs, Maximov wrote: "I was happy with the decision to live in the village, to be free, to familiarise myself with know peasant life - not through someone else's glasses and not from childhood memories, but in the fullness of my preparation and love." As the artist himself states, the entirety of September 1866 was dedicated to "composing the 'Storyteller of Fairy Tales', turning this way and that the original sketch made in Shubin from childhood memories." It is known that the portrayal of a woman telling fairy tales was inspired by the artist's memories of his mother Anastasia Vasilyevna. Maximov later described his work during this period as follows: "Whatever work I did, I could not forget my main task - to express the different characters of children listening to their grandmother. Fascinated by this side of work, I loved my painting. It seemed to be left to fulfil; I especially believed in myself when I painted the sketch in oil paint."

Nevertheless, work on the painting proceeded slowly. In December 1866, Maximov's friend Arseny Shurygin, an artist, visited Lopino to observe the local traditions associated with Christmas and New Year. Shurygin persuaded Maximov to begin work as soon as possible on the final version of ‘The Storyteller of Fairy Tales’. In his memoirs, Vassily Maximovich wrote: "Arseny's insistence that I should sooner start serious work made me confess my weakness of will, the sin that I did not suffer from in relation to art." In an attempt to justify himself, Maximov also cited the impossibility of working on a complex piece in his brother's "tiny cell" or large hut, which was always occupied by members of his family and often by strangers. These explanations did not satisfy Shurygin, who suspected the real reason for the delay was his friend's infatuation.

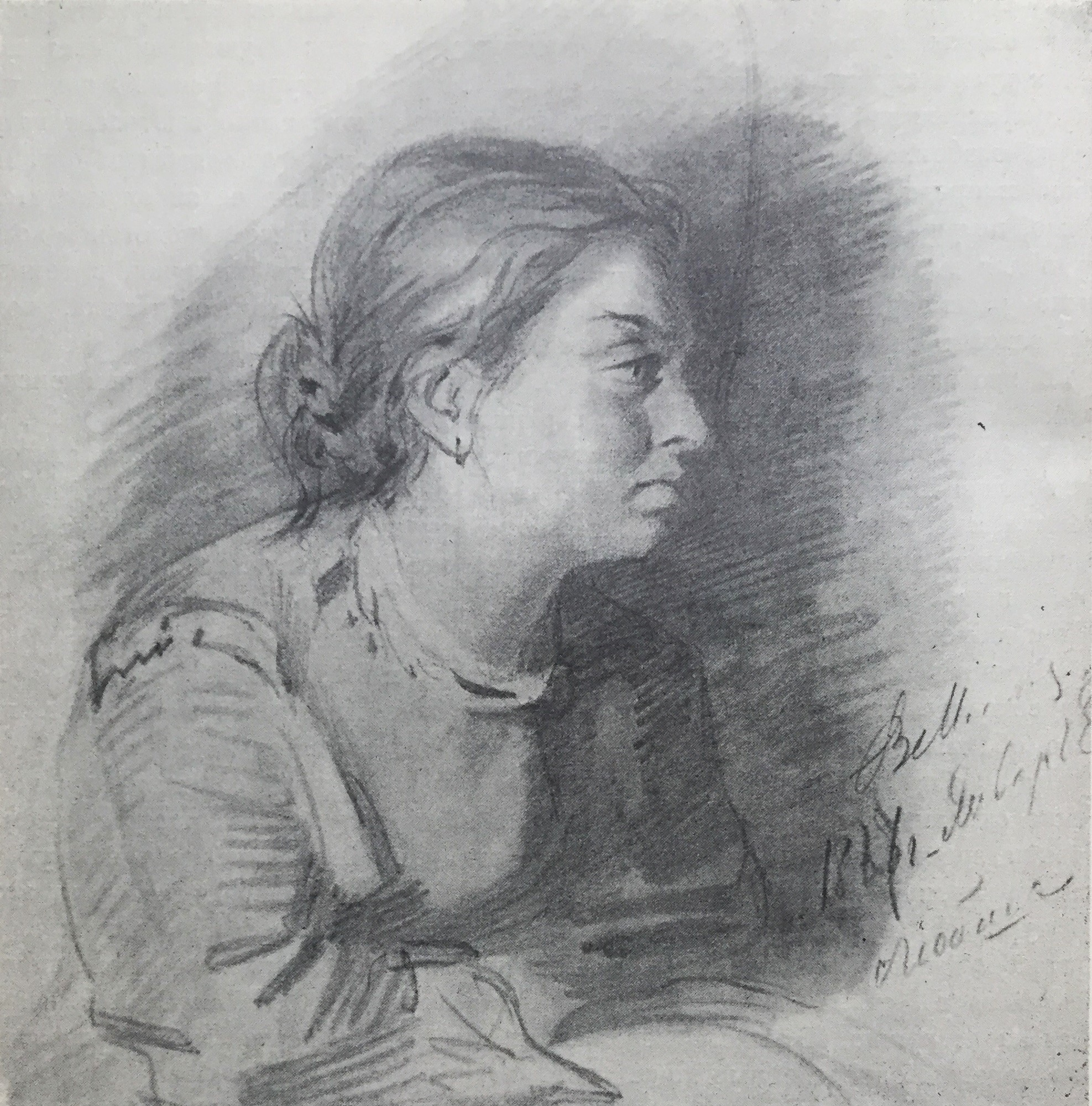
Vassily Maximov. Portrait of Lydia Alexandrovna Izmailova, the artist's future wife (1867)

Approximately a month prior to Shurygin's arrival, on 21 November 1866, Maximov met his future wife, Lydia Alexandrovna, daughter of Alexander Alexandrovich Izmailov, a State Councillor (later an Active State Councillor), and his wife, Nadezhda Konstantinovna, who owned the small estate of Lyubsha near Lopin. Maximov, according to his memories of Lydia Alexandrovna, "fell in love with this divine girl, fell in love passionately, sacredly ..." The artist let her in on his work on Grandma's Fairy Tales, and later wrote: "Lydia Alexandrovna was very much occupied with my work, she got so used to me that imperceptibly we began to dream of a successfully completed painting..." It is possible that one of the images, depicting a young woman breastfeeding a child, was inspired by Lydia Alexandrovna. A drawing of her image by Maximov, dated 18 January 1867, has been preserved. From the beginning of 1867 the artist had a new studio near Lyubsha at his disposal. It was "a peasant's hut, the most typical, Ladoga, spacious[,] with a stove and a bed, huge entryway and a yard." His future mother-in-law, Nadezhda Konstantinovna Izmailova, was a great help to Maximov in finding a house for the workshop and negotiating the rent (the final price was three rubles a month).

From the beginning of 1867 Maximov resumed active work on Grandma's Fairy Tales. While still in Lopin, he "drew 'The Storyteller' with sauce according to a sketch with changes in the composition." Then, at the invitation of the Izmailovs, he moved to Lubsha, since it was closer to his cold studio, where he measured the interior of the hut, which he used to construct the perspective. It took him about a year to complete the painting of Grandma's Fairy Tales, which he finished on 27 November 1867.

=== Society for the Encouragement of Artists exhibition, the purchase of the painting and subsequent events ===
Towards the end of 1867 and the beginning of 1868 (the appearance of the painting Grandma's Fairy Tales at the exhibition is dated in different sources as either December 1867 or early 1868), the painting entitled Grandma's Fairy Tales, which was exhibited under the title The Old Woman Telling Tales on a Winter Evening, was presented at the Society for the Encouragement of Artists' permanent exhibition, held in St Petersburg. The collector and patron of the arts, Pavel Tretyakov, who was in Moscow at the time, followed the exhibited paintings with great interest. He was informed of new additions by the artist Apollinarius Goravsky. In December 1867, he wrote to Tretyakov that "Maximov has quite distinguished himself with his work," and his painting "Grandmother's Tales" is "something that really deserves special attention" and has "special authority." On Goravsky's advice, Tretyakov purchased the painting Grandma's Fairy Tales, which was valued at 500 rubles (according to other sources, Tretyakov paid 300 rubles for the painting). According to the catalogue of the Tretyakov Gallery, the purchase took place in 1867. It was the first work by Maximov that Tretyakov acquired. Furthermore, in 1867 or 1868, Maximov was awarded a prize of 500 rubles by the Society for the Encouragement of Artists for his painting Grandma's Fairy Tales. This prize, established by the patron of the arts Pavel Stroganov, was awarded for genre painting. The financial reward from this award helped to strengthen the artist's financial position.

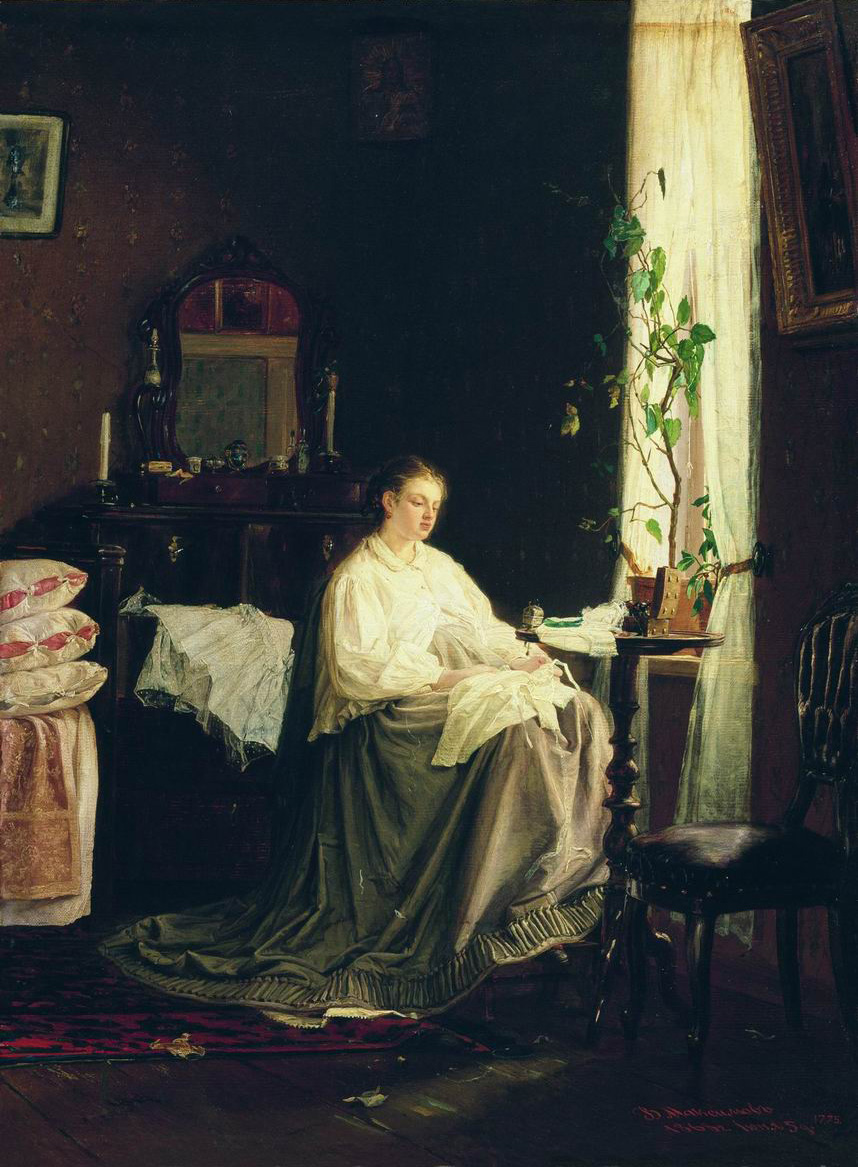
Vasily Maximov. Dream of the Future (1868, State Russian Museum)

Vasily Maximovich and Lydia Alexandrovna were wed on 29 January 1868, following the completion of the painting. Prior to this, they had to persuade Lydia Alexandrovna's parents to consent to the marriage for a long time. Nadezhda Konstantinovna believed that her daughter could find a husband with a higher social status and was shocked that she was marrying the son of a peasant. Alexander Alexandrovich, with all due respect to Vasily Maximovich, made reference to the fact that Lydia Alexandrovna was still very young, as well as the fact that she had no dowry. In his opinion, such a marriage would impede the growth and development of an aspiring artist. At the same time, Alexander Alexandrovich was a passionate lover of art. While visiting the Society for the Encouragement of Artists exhibition, he saw a painting, Grandma's Fairy Tales, which he liked very much and was proud to know its author. Finally, the marriage licence was granted. That same year, Maximov portrayed his young wife in the canvas Dream of the Future (or Dreams of the Future, 1868, now in the State Russian Museum).

In 1870, Vassily Maximov requested that Pavel Tretyakov send his painting, Grandma's Fairy Tales, from Moscow to St Petersburg for exhibition at the Academy of Arts. In a letter dated 16 August 1870, Tretyakov replied: "I am pleased to send your painting directly to the Board of the Academy, but after the exhibition is over, I humbly ask you to hurry as quickly as possible so that the painting is well packed and sent to me in Moscow." The painting was returned to Tretyakov on 22 December. In the same year, 1870, Maximov was awarded the title of class artist of the 1st degree for the paintings Grandma's Fairy Tales, Dream of the Future, Gathering for a Walk (1869, now in the State Museum of Fine Arts of Kazakhstan) and Old Woman (1869, now in the State Tretyakov Gallery).

== Subject, characters and composition ==
The plot of the painting, entitled Grandma's Fairy Tales, is relatively simple. It depicts a winter evening in a village hut, illuminated by the light of a luchina, in which a large peasant family is gathered together. Both adults and children are listening to a fairy tale told by their grandmother. The actors are positioned in a semicircle. The grandmother-teller is situated in the centre, flanked by an old peasant with a grey beard on the left and a young woman nursing a child on the right. On the left side of the canvas, between the old man and the grandmother, are several children. On the right, between the old woman and the nurse, sits a young woman lost in thought. The light of the luchina brightly illuminates the storyteller and the listeners gathered around her, but it fades towards the edges of the painting, leaving the figures at the left edge, namely an old man and a barely distinguishable young peasant, in semi-darkness, with a horse collar, surcingle and a rope hanging on the wall behind them. The right corner of the hut is well illuminated, with a large stove and peasant household items, such as a shelf with crockery, a child's blanket, a half-shawl, bundles of dried mushrooms and a trabucco pole.

The grandmother's costume is very typical. She is dressed in a brownish shawl and a characteristic calico skirt, made of a fabric that has long been used in Russian villages and later became an integral part of the assortment of chintz printing factories in the Russian Empire. The burning luchina and the old woman's bright skirt, situated at the centre of the canvas, are the most intense areas of colour in the painting. Simultaneously, the artist refrained from "dressing" the young peasant women in everyday dress, although he did incorporate specific details into their appearance.

Fragments of the painting Grandma's Fairy Tales

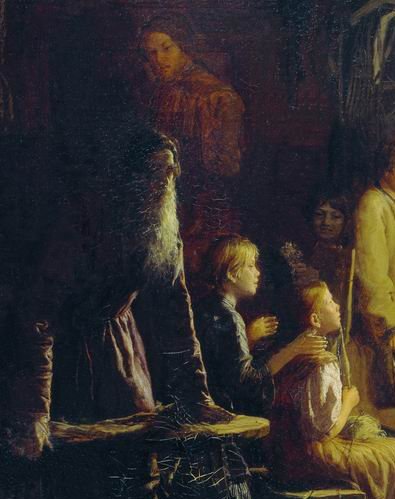
The old man, the young peasant and the children on the left-hand side

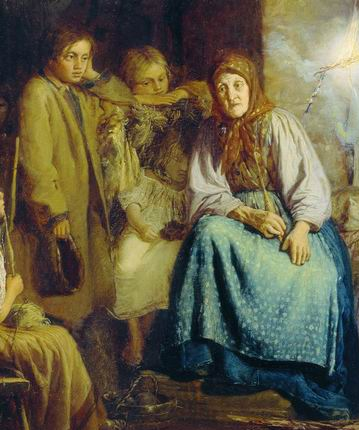
Grandmother storyteller and children listening to her in the centre

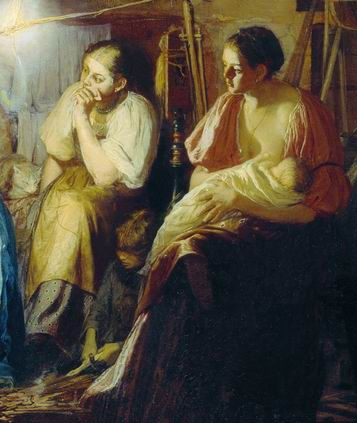
A woman with a child and a girl on the right-hand side

Maximov utilised his workshop near Lyubsha, which he was granted access to at the beginning of 1867, as a typical Ladoga hut. Not only did he sketch the interior of the hut in detail, but he also took careful measurements - one of Maksimov's albums contains the height of windowsills, the width and height of windows and partitions, (Note: part of the wall between window and door openings) and other parameters. It also shows the position, shape and dimensions of the oven (including the "chelo" - the outer opening in the front of the oven). These sketches and measurements helped the artist to accurately represent the perspective of the future painting.

In regard to the characters depicted in the painting, Maximov was posed by his brother Alexei, his sister-in-law (brother's wife) Varvara, and peasant children, among whom were likely the artist's nephews Vasya, Vanya and Petya. In her memoirs, Margarita Yamshchikova (pseudonym: Al Altaev) states that the elderly woman Yudishna served as the model for the storyteller of fairy tales. Researchers of Maximov's work suggest that the image of a young woman breastfeeding a child may have been inspired by Lidia Alexandrovna Izmailova, the artist's future wife. According to the art historian Alexei Leonov, "the similarity of her slender figure, beautiful full shoulders[,] and common facial features speak to this." Pavel Tretyakov requested alterations to her image, having sent the painting from Moscow to St. Petersburg for inclusion in the Academy of Arts exhibition. In a letter dated 16 August 1870, he wrote to Maximov: "I would advise and ask you to correct the arms of the female figure with the child, which are very wrong: the left one, which holds the child, is all terribly long, and the right one is long at the top and short at the bottom, it seems to me that it is possible to correct, and there is still a lot of time before the opening of the exhibition." However, Maximov did not correct anything, explaining in detail why he did not do so. In a letter to Tretyakov dated 12 December 1870, the artist wrote that "changing the arms would require shortening the breasts and raising the child," after which "the torso would be out of proportion to the rest of the body." Thus, in Maximov's opinion, such changes would have necessitated the repainting of the entire female figure, which he would not have dared to do without Tretyakov's prior approval. Moreover, such a transformation would require the removal of the varnish, which, according to the artist, "is a risky business - you can remove the top layer of paint along with the varnish", which "gives the painting its overall tone."

== Studies, sketches and repetitions ==
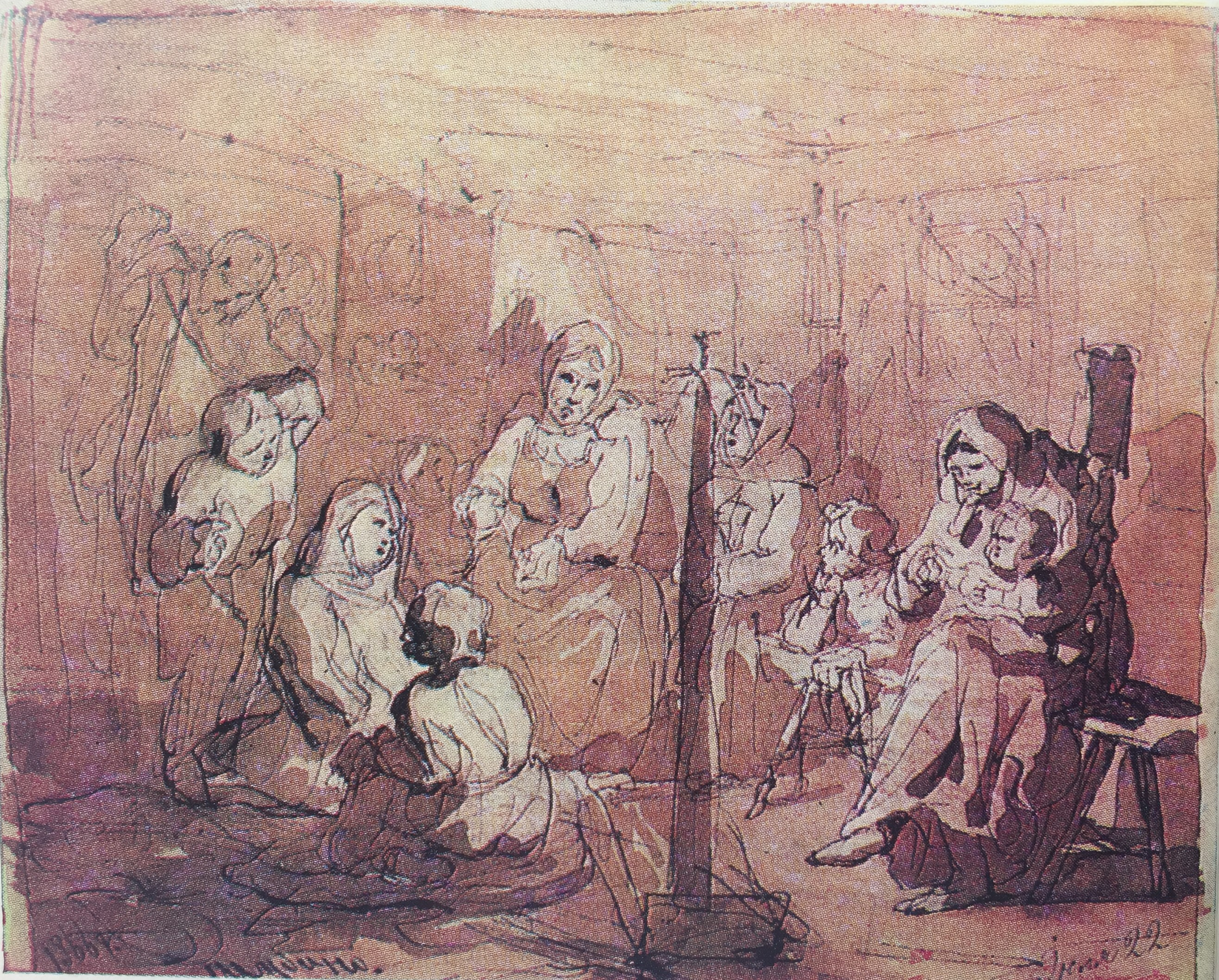
Winter Evening in the Village (original idea for the painting, 1866, State Russian Museum)

"The initial idea" of the painting Grandma's Fairy Tales is believed to be the drawing Winter Evening in the Village (paper, pen, sepia, 16.5 × 21 cm, State Russian Museum). Created by Maximov in Shubin, dated 22 July 1866, the drawing is regarded by the artist as an "initial sketch" made "from childhood memories."

The sketch for the painting Grandma's Fairy Tales (paper, pencil, 20.5 × 28 cm, State Russian Museum), which depicts three peasant women, is dated 3 December 1866, at which time the artist was already in Lopin. In this graphic study, Maximov sought to identify a specific type of elderly woman, namely a storyteller of fairy tales.

Additionally, the drawing entitled Old Woman (paper, pencil) was published in the magazine The Artist (No. 45 for 1895). The current location of this graphic study is unknown. According to art historian Alexei Leonov, "it is undoubtedly an excellent natural drawing of an old woman who served as a model for the painting." The sketch was dated 30 January 1867, and then "1867" was corrected to "1869". Leonov considered the date ‘1869’ to be clearly erroneous and dated the drawing to 1867.

Additionally, the State Russian Museum houses a preliminary drawing of the painting's left side (paper, ink, 43 × 23.1 cm), dated 1867. This drawing depicts standing adults and a group of listening children. It is likely to be the work to which the art historian Alexei Sidorov refers: "for Grandma's Fairy Tales Maximov created brush sketches that show at a glance how important the play of light and shadow was for him." Additionally, in his memoirs Maximov mentioned a "sketch in oil paint", the whereabouts of which are unknown (as of 1951).

Graphic studies for the painting Grandma's Fairy Tales

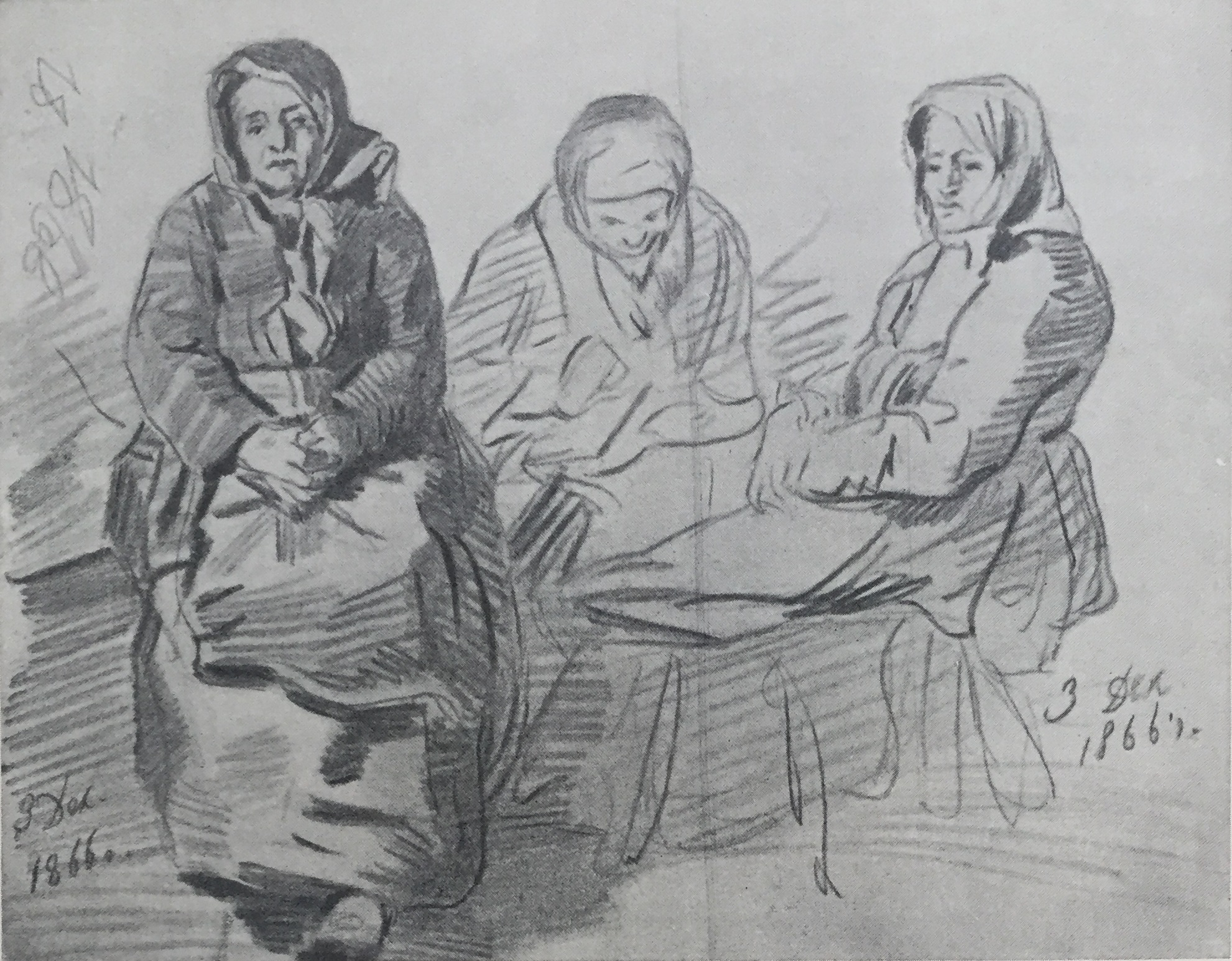
Sketch for the painting Grandma's Fairy Tales (1866, State Russian Museum)

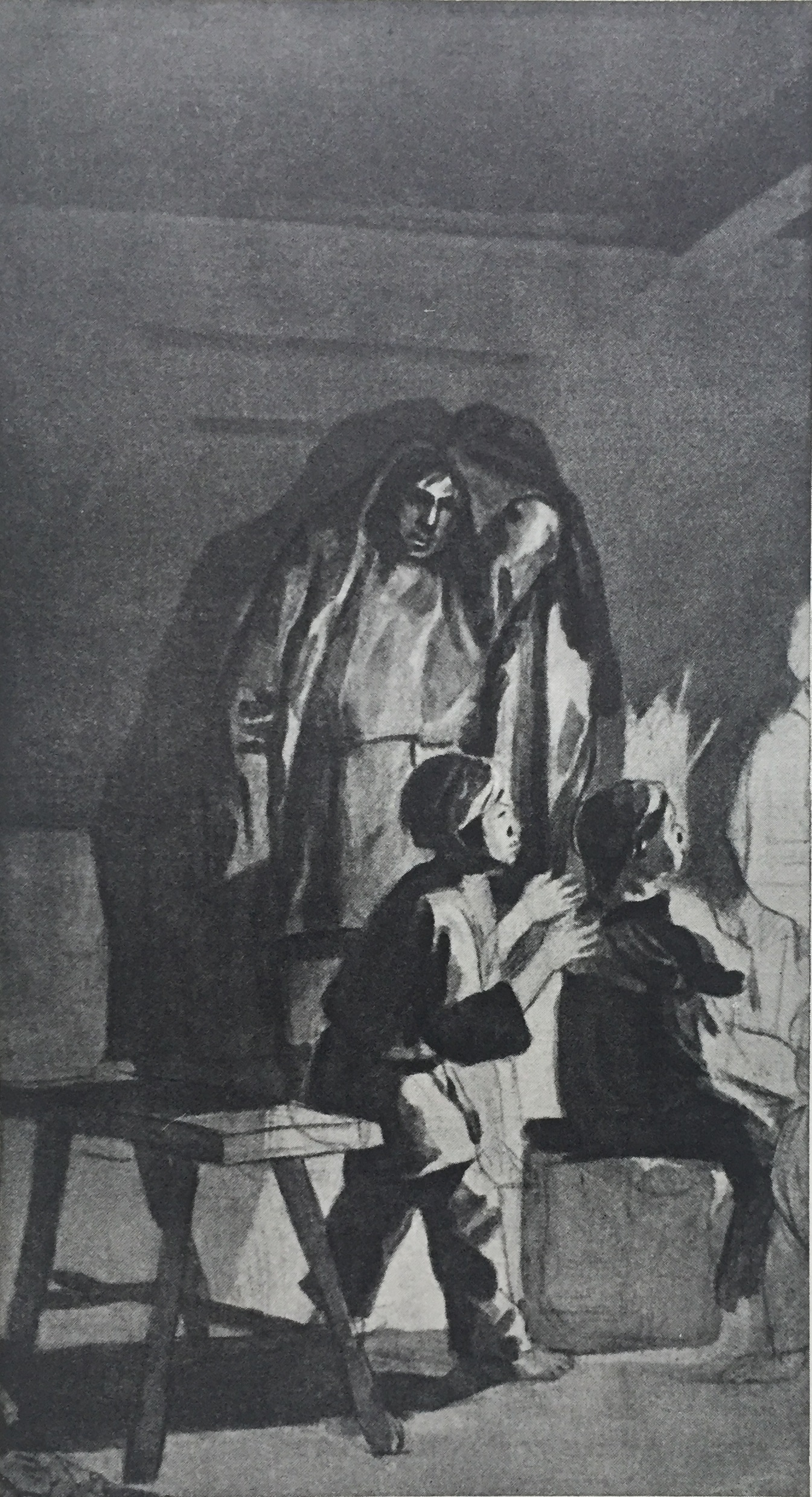
Preliminary drawing of the left side of the painting (1867, State Russian Museum)

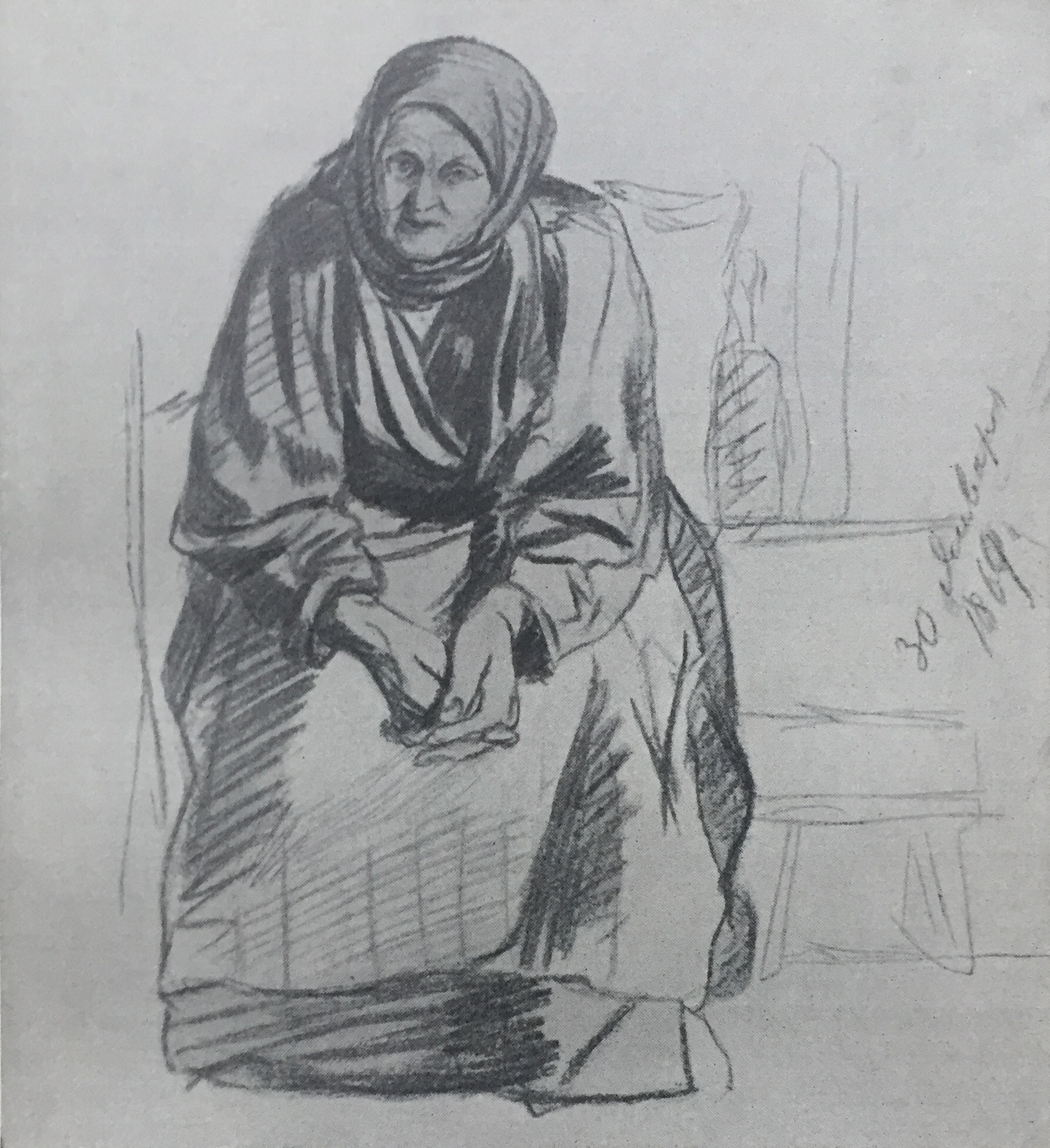
Old Woman (sketch for the painting, 1867)

Additionally, the Tretyakov Gallery houses a reduced reproduction of the painting Grandma's Fairy Tales, created in 1898 (canvas, oil, 27 × 35 cm, inv. 6213). The painting was previously in the collection of Isadjan Isadjanov and was acquired by the Tretyakov Gallery in 1925 from the 5th Proletarian Museum of the Rogozhsko-Simonovsky District of Moscow.

== Reviews and criticism ==
According to the art historian Alexander Zamoshkin, Maximov, while working on Grandma's Fairy Tales, understood perfectly well that "fairy tales, like all folk poetry, contain a deep content of folk life." According to Zamoshkin, the artist "approached this subject with great love and, avoiding any sentimentality, [created] deeply vital images", with the pictures of peasant children being particularly heartfelt. In his writings, Zamoshkin observed that the paintings Grandma's Fairy Tales (1867) and A Sorcerer Comes to a Peasant Wedding (1875) exemplify Maximov's aspiration to an epic form of narration. However, in his subsequent works, such as Family Section (1876), Sick Husband (1881), and others, this aspiration shifts towards a publicistic character.

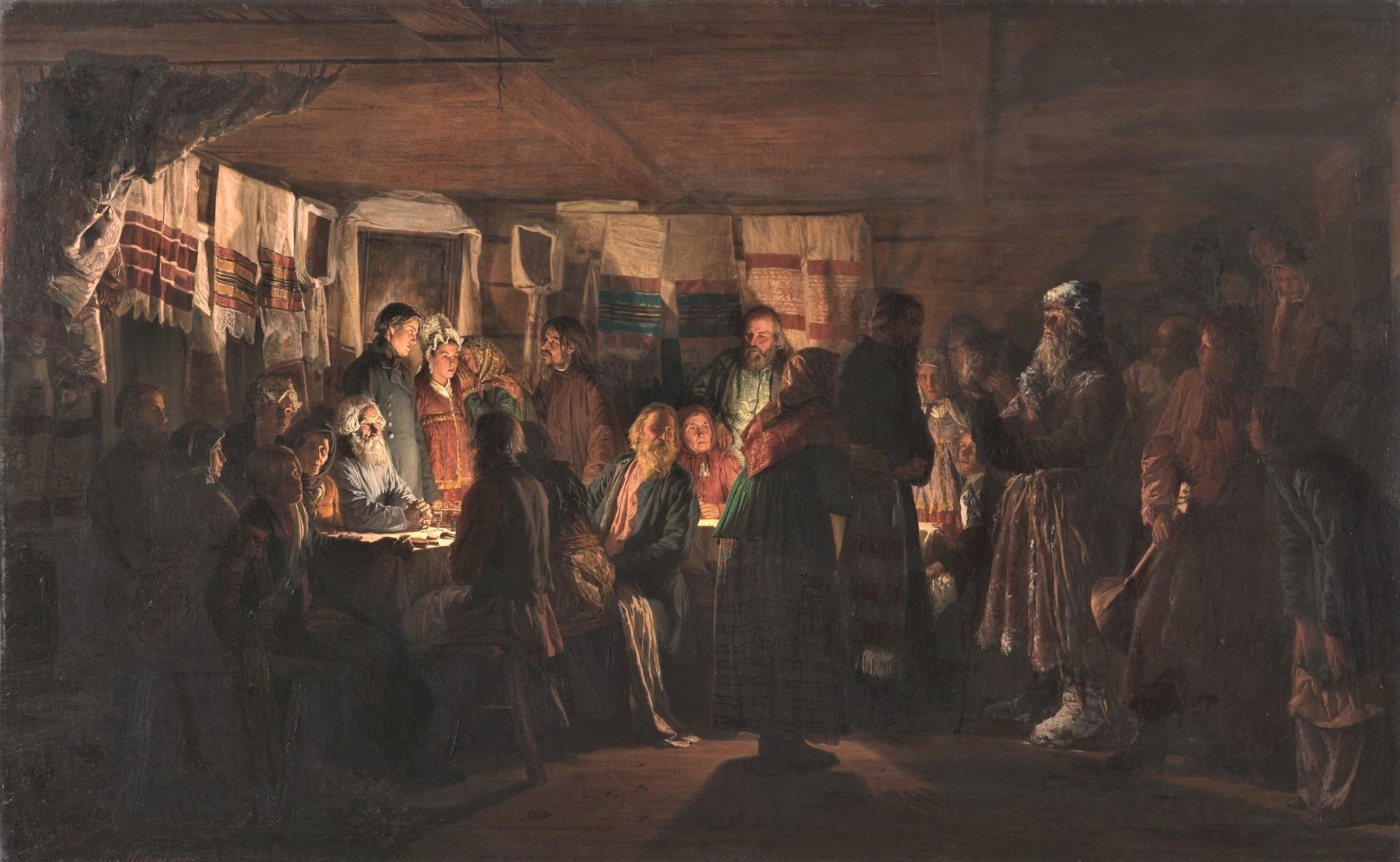
Vassily Maximov. A Sorcerer Comes to a Peasant Wedding (1875, State Tretyakov Gallery)

In his monograph on Maksimov's work, art historian Alexei Leonov posited that the construction of the painting Grandma's Fairy Tales "is characterised by great thoughtfulness and betrays the academic school through which the master went." According to Leonov, each figure in the painting is "strictly considered from the point of view of the relationship of the figure to the whole group and to the whole space as a whole, and from the point of view of the expressiveness of its silhouette." This "skilful compositional construction" results in a painting that is "a typical village scene," wherein all the characters appear true and convincing. Concurrently, Leonov posits that the elderly female narrator and the old male peasant "represent typical, living faces," while the others, including the breastfeeding woman and the listening children, "are distinguished by features of certain idealisation." Leonov observed that at the exhibition of the Society for the Encouragement of Artists, where Maximov's work was initially showcased, it enjoyed well-deserved success "as a thing that truthfully conveys one of the attractive scenes of village life, warmly and intimately outlining the types and characters of peasants."

According to the art historian Dmitry Sarabianov, the "premonitions" of the success that would accompany Maximov's paintings in the 1870s were already noticeable in the second half of the 1860s, especially in Grandma's Fairy Tales. According to Sarabianov, in this work "the poetic note" that "will be particularly audible" in Maximov's later painting A Sorcerer Comes to a Peasant Wedding (1875) "sounded for the first time." Sarabianov wrote that in the painting Grandma's Fairy Tales "the scene as a whole focuses on a motif that is traditional, patriarchal and therefore beautiful."

Art historian Frieda Roginskaya observed that the painting Grandma's Fairy Tales, created in 1867, brought Maximov his first success. According to her, "despite the immaturity of this canvas, it contains many new, original features that will be developed in the subsequent work of the artist." She noted that the painting Grandma's Fairy Tales gives the viewer an opportunity to feel the spiritual and emotional effect that the legends and tales of the folk imagination have on the souls of the peasants. In addition, according to Roginskaya, Maximov "can rightly be called the creator of peasant interiors," and this applies not only to Grandma's Fairy Tales but also to a number of later paintings in the artist's peasant cycle. Roginskaya credits Maximov with the fact that, unlike other artists who worked on the peasant theme, he "brings his characters inside the hut, taking off fur coats and homespun coats from their shoulders."

== Bibliography ==
- Aldonina, Rimma (2007). Vasily Maksimov Василий Максимов [Vassily Maximov]. Mastera zhivopisi (in Russian). Moscow: Bely Gorod.
- Altaev, Al (1914). "Khudozhnik-narodnik" Художник-народник [Folk artist] (PDF). Golos Minuvshego (in Russian) (6): 41–69.
- Altaev, Al (1957). Pamyatnye vstrechi Памятные встречи [Memorable meetings]. Seriya literaturnykh memuarov (in Russian). Moscow: State Publishing House of Fiction.
- Botkina, A.P. (1960). Pavel Mikhaylovich Tretyakov v zhizni i iskusstve Павел Михайлович Третьяков в жизни и искусстве [Pavel Mikhailovich Tretyakov in life and art] (in Russian). Leningrad: Iskusstvo.
- Gomberg-Verzhbinskaya, E.P. (1970). Peredvizhniki Передвижники [Peredvizhniki] (in Russian). Leningrad: Iskusstvo.
- Dalkevich, M.M. (1912). "Akademik V. M. Maksimov" Академик В. М. Максимов [Academician V. M. Maksimov] (PDF). Niva (in Russian) (8): 154–156.
- Zamoshkin, A.I. (1950). V. M. Maximov В. М. Максимов [V. M. Maximov]. Ocherki po istorii russkoy zhivopisi vtoroy poloviny XIX veka (in Russian). Moscow: State Tretyakov Gallery Publishing House.
- Lazuko, A.K. (1982). Vassily Maximov Василий Максимов [Vassily Maximov]. Massovaya biblioteka po iskusstvu (in Russian). Leningrad: Khudozhnik RSFSR.
- Leonov, A.I. (1951). Vasily Maksimov. Zhizn i tvorchestvo Василий Максимов. Жизнь и творчество [Vassily Maximov. Life and work] (in Russian). Moscow: Islusstvo.
- Leonov, A.I. (1962). "Vassily Maximovich Maximov" Василий Максимович Максимов [Vassily Maximovich Maximov]. Russian Art: Essays on the Life and Work of Artists. The Second Half of the XIX Century, part I (in Russian). Moscow: Iskusstvo: 227–264.
- Maximov, Vassily (1913). "Avtobiograficheskiye zapiski (okonchaniye)" Автобиографические записки (окончание) [Autobiographical Notes (ending)] (PDF). Golos minuvshego (in Russian) (7): 86–122.
- Metelkina, А.G. (2008). "Maximov Vassily Maximovich" Максимов Василий Максимович [Maximov Vassily Maximovich]. Russkiye zhivopistsy XVIII—XIX veka. Biografichesky slovar Русские живописцы XVIII—XIX века. Биографический словарь [Russian painters of the 18th-19th centuries. Biographical dictionary] (in Russian). Е.F. Petinova. Saint Petersburg: Azbuka-Klassika. pp. 404–406. ISBN 978-5-91181-923-1.
- Repin, Ilya (1913). "Khudozhnik-narodnik" Художник-народник [Folk artist] (PDF). Golos minuvshego (in Russian) (4): 145–146.
- Roginskaya, F.S. (1989). Tovarishchestvo peredvizhnykh khudozhestvennykh vystavok Товарищество передвижных художественных выставок [Society for Travelling Art Exhibitions] (in Russian). Moscow: Iskusstvo.
- Sarabianov, D.V. (1989). Istoriya russkogo iskusstva vtoroy poloviny XIX veka История русского искусства второй половины XIX века [History of Russian art of the second half of the 19th century] (in Russian). Moscow: Moscow University Press.
- Sidorov, А.A. (1960). Risunok russkikh masterov. Vtoraya polovina XIX v Рисунок русских мастеров. Вторая половина XIX в [Drawing of Russian masters. The second half of the 19th century] (in Russian). Moscow: USSR Academy of Sciences Publishing.
- Chizhmak, М.S. (2015). "Divnaya povest o minuvshem. Kartina V. M. Maksimova «Vsyo v proshlom»" Дивная повесть о минувшем. Картина В. М. Максимова «Всё в прошлом» [A marvellous tale of the past. V. M. Maximov's painting "Everything in the Past"]. Russkoye iskusstvo (in Russian) (2): 72–75.
- V. Maximov В. Максимов [V. Maximov]. 50 khudozhnikov — shedevry russkoy zhivopisi (in Russian). Vol. 47. Moscow: De Agostini. 2011.
- Gosudarstvennaya Tretyakovskaya galereya — katalog sobraniya Государственная Третьяковская галерея — каталог собрания [State Tretyakov Gallery - catalogue of the collection] (in Russian). Vol. 4: Painting of the Second Half of the 19th Century, Book 1, A–M. Y.V. Bruk, L.I. Iovleva. Moscow: Krasnaya ploshchad. 2001. ISBN 5-900743-56-X.
- Gosudarstvenny Russky muzey — Zhivopis, XVIII — nachalo XX veka (katalog) Государственный Русский музей — Живопись, XVIII — начало XX века (каталог) [State Russian Museum - Painting, 18th - early 20th century (catalogue)] (in Russian). А.V. Gubarev, N.N. Novouspensky, V.A. Pushkaryov, G.V. Smirnov. Leningrad: Aurora and Iskusstvo. 1980.
- Gosudarstvenny Russky muzey — katalog sobraniya Государственный Русский музей — каталог собрания [State Russian Museum - catalogue of the collection] (in Russian). Vol. 6: Painting of the second half of the 19th century (K-M). G.N. Goldovsky, V.A. Lenyashin. Saint Petersburg: Palace Editions. 2016. ISBN 978-5-93332-565-9.
- Gorkin, А.P., ed. (2007). Iskusstvo. Sovremennaya illyustrirovannaya entsiklopediya Искусство. Современная иллюстрированная энциклопедия [Art. Modern Illustrated Encyclopaedia] (in Russian). Vol. 3 (L-P). Moscow: Rosman. ISBN 978-5-353-02798-0.
- Pisma khudozhnikov Pavlu Mikhaylovichu Tretyakovu: 1856—1869 Письма художников Павлу Михайловичу Третьякову: 1856—1869 [Letters from artists to Pavel Mikhailovich Tretyakov: 1856-1869] (in Russian). N.G. Galkina, М.N. Grigorieva. Moscow: Iskusstvo. 1960.
- Pisma khudozhnikov Pavlu Mikhaylovichu Tretyakovu: 1870—1879 Письма художников Павлу Михайловичу Третьякову: 1870—1879 [Letters from artists to Pavel Mikhailovich Tretyakov: 1870-1879] (in Russian). N.G. Galkina, М.N. Grigorieva, N.L. Pryimak. Moscow: Iskusstvo. 1968.
