= Erna Pomerantseva =

Russian folklorist (1899-1980

Erna Vasilievna Pomerantseva (Russian: Эрна Васильевна Померанцева; 19 April (NS) 1899 – 11 August 1980, née Hoffman) was a Russian folklorist.

== Biography ==
Pomerantseva was born on 7 (OS)/19 April (NS) 1899. She graduated in 1922 from the department of history and philology of the Moscow State University. She was an associate professor at the Moscow State University department of folklore from its establishment in 1938 until 1958, and acting head of department from 1957 to 1958.

Pomerantseva's research focused on Russian fairy tales, the connections between literature and folklore, and the role of folklore today. She led many expeditions to collect folklore. In 1964 the earned the degree of Doctor of Historical Sciences at the Institute of Anthropology and Ethnography with the thesis Судьбы русской сказки в XVIII-XX вв. (The fate of the Russian fairy tale in the 17th-20th centuries).

Her work Русские народные сказки (Russian Folk Tales, 1957) was translated into German as Russische Volksmärchen (Akademie Verlag, 1966) and was in its 13th edition in 2021.

Writing in 2009 in the journal Féeries on the study of Russian fairy tales, Marina Guister (Марина Гистер) wrote that Pomerantseva was a "remarkable folklorist", praising her collection of songs and urban legends and her writings on folk tales.

For some time she signed her articles with double surname "Gofman-Pomerantseva" (Гофман-Померанцева).

Pomerantseva died on 11 August 1980, aged 81.

== Books ==
- Сказки И. Ф. Ковалева (recording and commentary by Э. Гофман and С. Минц (Софья Исааковна Минц (1899—1964))) Moscow, 1941
- Русские народные сказки (Russian Folk Tales, 1957), translated as: Burde-Schneidewind, Gisela; Pomeranzewa, Erna (1964). Russische Volksmärchen (13. Aufl. Reprint 2021 ed.). Berlin: De Gruyter. ISBN 9783112526682.
- Русская народная сказка. М., 1963
- Судьбы русской сказки. М., 1965
- Мифологические персонажи в русском фольклоре. М.: Наука, 1975
