= Novoladozhsky Uyezd =

Novoladozhsky Uyezd (Новоладожский уезд) was one of the subdivisions of the Saint Petersburg Governorate of the Russian Empire. It was situated in the northeastern part of the governorate. Its administrative centre was Novaya Ladoga.

== Demographics ==
At the time of the Russian Empire Census of 1897, Novoladozhsky Uyezd had a population of 87,841. Of these, 99.1% spoke Russian, 0.3% Latvian, 0.1% Finnish, 0.1% Yiddish, 0.1% Estonian, 0.1% German and 0.1% Polish as their native language. In terms of present-day administrative borders, Novoladozhsky Uyezd is divided between the Volkhovsky, Kirovsky, Kirishsky and Lodeynopolsky districts of Leningrad Oblast.
