= Curtis O. Dedeaux =

American law enforcement officer

- Born: 6 October 1919; Harrison County, Mississippi, U.S.
- Died: 10 September 1966; Biloxi, Mississippi, U.S.
- Resting place: Evergreen Cemetery
- Education: University of Chicago
- Known for: Sheriff of Harrison County, Mississippi

Curtis O. Dedeaux (October 6, 1919 – September 10, 1966) was an American law enforcement officer who served as the Sheriff of Harrison County, Mississippi from 1960 to 1964.

== Early life ==
Curtis O. Dedeaux was born on October 6, 1919, in Harrison County, Mississippi, United States. He was educated in Mississippi schools and then obtained a master's degree in political science from the University of Chicago. He thereafter worked at a packing plant. He married and had a stepdaughter.

== Shrieval career ==
Dedeaux ran for the office of Sheriff of Harrison County in 1955 and lost. He sought office again in 1959 and defeated Edward McDonald in the second Democratic primary in August, eventually beginning his term in 1960. Dedeaux was keen to keep racial relations in Harrison County orderly, and relied on black civic leader Felix Henry Dunn to achieve this. Dunn was a businessman who supplied jukeboxes and cigarettes' vending machines to various establishments around Gulfport, and Dedeaux forced other businessmen to withdraw their machines in favor of Dunn's in exchange for the black leader's cooperation on race matters. He also ignored rumors of Dunn's operation of illegal slot machines for the same purpose. Following pushes by other black residents led by Gilbert R. Mason to integrate the beaches in Biloxi, Dedeaux instructed Dunn to try and stop any possible protests or unrest. When Dunn said he was powerless to do this, Dedeaux threatened him. When an attempt by 100 black citizens to integrate the beaches in Biloxi on April 24, 1960, was met with violence from a white mob, the sheriff ordered his deputies to not arrest anyone. As violence spread throughout the city, Dedeaux ordered his deputies to protect Mason's home from a bomb threat. He later accused Dunn of responsibility for the riot for failing to stop the black protesters.

On the night of June 10/11, 1961, Dedeaux received three anonymous phone calls at his home requesting that he personally investigate claims of illegal gambling at clubs along U.S. Route 90. Dedeaux dispatched his deputies to investigate the complaints and remained at home. The deputies found no evidence of criminal activity, but at about 2 a.m. on June 11 a dynamite charge blew up Dedeaux's private car, damaging his home. He believed that this was an assassination attempt in revenge for some of his policing activity.

Mississippi was officially a dry state at the time Dedeaux was in office, but Harrison County was home to numerous bars and an active tourist industry, and he rarely enforced prohibition laws. When asked why, he stated, "If I tried to enforce the liquor laws, I'd bankrupt hundreds of businesses here. I'd cut the tourist trade by half, maybe by three quarters." In June 1962 Mississippi Governor Ross Barnett ordered a crackdown on liquor sales in the Gulf coast region and dispatched the National Guard to raid nightclubs. Dedeaux requested that all establishments which sold liquor "remained closed until further notice". He criticized Barnett's crackdown as a publicity stunt, saying "He's not going to change anything on the coast and he knows it." Dedeaux left office in 1964.

== Later life ==
In 1962 bar and brothel owner Joseph A. Garriga was arrested for violating the Mann Act. He testified in his own trial that he had paid Dedeaux protection money to allow his business to remain open. Garriga was convicted, but his testimony led the federal government to investigate Dedeaux for failure to report taxable income. He was subsequently indicted and found guilty in court of falsifying information on tax forms. The judge sentenced him to two years incarceration and ordered him to pay a fine of $15,000. Before he was to report to prison, Dedeaux was found dead at his home in Biloxi on September 10, 1966. An autopsy ruled that he had died from barbiturate poisoning. A funeral was held at Our Lady of Fatima Catholic Church in Biloxi and he was buried at Evergreen Cemetery in Gulfport.

== Works cited ==
- Butler, J. Michael (February 2002). "The Mississippi State Sovereignty Commission and Beach Integration, 1959-1963: A Cotton-Patch Gestapo?". The Journal of Southern History. 68 (1): 107–148. doi:10.2307/3069692. JSTOR 3069692.
- Tracy, Janice Branch (2015). Mississippi Moonshine Politics: How Bootleggers & the Law Kept a Dry State Soaked. Arcadia Publishing. ISBN 9781626197602.
