= Biloxi wade-ins =

Protests in Mississippi between 1959 and 1963

Mississippi state historical marker on Biloxi Beach commemorating the wade-ins

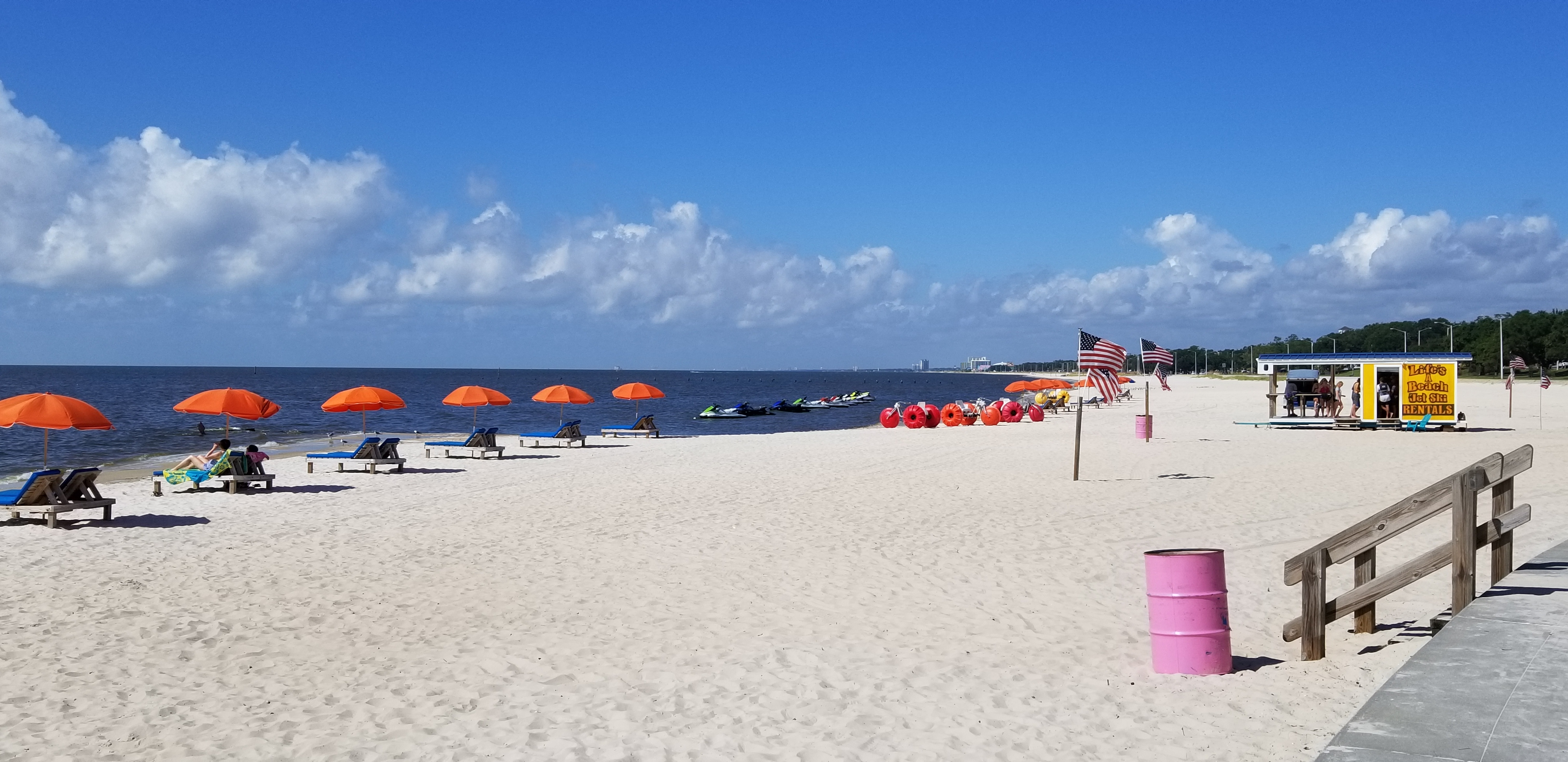
The beach near the location of the wade-ins.

The Biloxi wade-ins were three protests that were conducted by local African Americans on the beaches of Biloxi, Mississippi between 1959 and 1963, during the civil rights movement. The demonstrations were led by Dr. Gilbert R. Mason Sr. in an effort to desegregate the city's 26 mi (42 km) of beaches on the Mississippi Gulf Coast. This was a local effort, without involvement from the state or national NAACP.

Before the beaches were desegregated, adjacent homeowners claimed the beaches as private property. However, Mason and his supporters noted that the beaches had been built in a major project completed in 1953 by the Army Corps of Engineers using taxpayer funds, and so thought they should be public and available to all. The new beaches had increased tourist traffic to the Biloxi area, strengthening the local economy. The effort by local authorities to maintain segregation was supported by actions of the Mississippi State Sovereignty Commission, a state agency founded in 1956. It used its extensive investigative powers to spy on citizens and plan economic retaliation against those who were civil rights activists or suspected of being so. These activities were secret for many decades; the commission's records were sealed until 1998.

The police stood by in Biloxi at the beach on April 24, 1960, as white mobs attacked black beachgoers, including elderly men, as well as women and children, while whites attacked blacks throughout the city into the evening. Ten times as many blacks were arrested than whites during the day, including an injured Mason. The mayor imposed a curfew and finally ordered officers to suppress the violence.

In response, African Americans in Biloxi formed a local chapter of the NAACP that week. That year they also conducted an extensive voter registration drive, seeking to get past the state-established barriers of poll taxes and subjective literacy tests. They conducted another wade-in in 1963, which was protected this time by the police, as state delays had prevented a court hearing at that point. In 1967, the federal court of appeals ruled in the black residents favor, determining that the beaches were public and therefore accessible by all.

== First wade-in ==
On May 14, 1959, Gilbert R. Mason Sr., a black physician in Biloxi, went swimming at a local beach with friends and their children. This has been called the first wade-in. A city policeman ordered them to leave, telling them that "Negroes don't come to the sand beach." Mason and his compatriot, Murray J. Saucier Jr., went to the police station to discover what law they had broken. They were told that the police could not show them the law until the next day but that "only the public could use the beach". When they returned to the station the following day, Biloxi mayor Laz Quave told them, "If you go back down there we're going to arrest you. That's all there is to it." Mason's 1959 demonstration has been called "Mississippi's first public assault on racial barriers in its 15-year civil rights struggle."

In June 1959, Mason's friend Dr. Felix H. Dunn, the first black doctor in the county, wrote to the Harrison County Board of Supervisors, asking "What laws, if any, prohibit the use of the beach facilities by Negro citizens?" The Board president's response was that property owners along the beach owned both "the beach and water from the shore line extending out 1500 feet".

In October 1959, Mason, Dunn, and two other black residents petitioned the board to allow "unrestrained use of the beach". A supervisor asked the group whether they would be satisfied with the use of a segregated portion of the beach. Mason said that they would be happy only with access to "every damn inch of it".

The Mississippi State Sovereignty Commission was later found to have worked secretly to investigate the signers of the petition to see how they could be pressured to drop their action. They investigated their jobs, credit histories, associates, and other matters. One signer was fired from his job for the city of Gulfport; another man and his wife were fired by the local white family they worked for. These two men withdrew from the petition, hoping to regain work. As Mason and Dunn were relatively independent of white economic ties, they continued their efforts. During this period, however, documents that were later unsealed revealed that Dunn had worked with Sheriff Curtis O. Dedeaux and reported on his activities with Mason. He was rewarded by getting new sites in black businesses for his side business of slot machines and jukeboxes.

The next spring, on April 17, 1960, Mason returned to the beach, where he was arrested as a "repeat offender". Dunn was also taken to the station but not charged. As word got out about his arrest, Mason learned that more people from the African-American community were declaring support for his actions.

== "Bloody Wade-in" ==
Mason led a second and larger formal protest a week later, on April 24, 1960, where 125 black men, women and children gathered on the beach. Violence led by whites erupted in what has become known as "Bloody Sunday" or "The Bloody Wade-in". Biloxi police recruited a mob of white citizens and therefore took no action to prevent their violence against protesters.

The New York Times described this event as "The worst racial riot in Mississippi history." Shots were fired, and rocks were thrown by whites, and there was fighting in the streets over the entire weekend. Two white men and eight black men suffered gunshot wounds. Numerous people were injured in fights, four seriously. Gilbert Mason was arrested and convicted of disturbing the peace for his role in the protest.

On May 17, 1960, the U.S. Justice Department sued the city of Biloxi for denying African Americans free access to the nationally funded beaches. The city repeatedly delayed the court hearing to such an extent that in 1963, Biloxi black leaders decided to stage another protest in order to allow them to file suit in the Harrison County courts and potentially gain an earlier resolution.

== Final protest ==
The final protest related to the beach access was held on June 23, 1963, two weeks after the assassination of Medgar Evers, the NAACP field secretary in the state. He had supported planning for the Biloxi Wade-Ins and had written a letter to Mason, saying "if we are to receive a beating, let's receive it because we have done something, not because we have done nothing". The protest had been postponed to allow participants time to mourn Evers's murder. Protesters placed black flags in the sand in his memory during the demonstration. Dozens of blacks were assaulted during the protest, including Wilmer B. McDaniel, owner of a local funeral home, whose wife shielded his body as he was beaten with chains causing blood to stain the beach sand. Biloxi police arrested 71 protesters, 68 of whom were black. More than 2000 white residents held a counterprotest, during which they vandalized and overturned Mason's car, but the police restrained them from physical violence against the blacks.

It was not until 1967 that the beach access case was settled, with a ruling in favor of the US Justice Department's position that these were public beaches, to be accessible by all residents. In the 1968 season, the entire 26-mile long beachfront was opened to all races for the first time.

== Legacy ==
After "Bloody Sunday", Mason and other local activists organized during the week of April 25, 1960, to form the first branch in Biloxi of the NAACP. In addition, they continued their grassroots efforts and in 1960 conducted a voter registration drive among African Americans, seeking to overcome their long exclusion from politics since the turn of the 20th century through such barriers as poll taxes and subjective application of literacy tests.

== Commemorations ==
In May 2009, the state of Mississippi dedicated a historical marker commemorating the 50th anniversary of the first wade-in. Former Mississippi governor William Winter apologized for having stood aside during those years of segregation, saying:

You didn't see this white face [on the beach with Mason] because white people, like me and many others, were intimidated by the massive forces of racial segregation. I have to admit I could not stand up to the pressure for being in public life in Mississippi and come out four-square for the elimination of segregation and for that I apologize today.

As part of the commemoration a section of U.S. Route 90 near Biloxi was renamed the "Dr. Gilbert Mason Sr. Memorial Highway".

In April 2010, a historical marker was placed at the Biloxi Lighthouse, site of one of the wade-ins, commemorating the 50th anniversary of the protests.
