= John McKim Jr. =

American merchant and early railroad executive

John McKim Jr. (March 28, 1766, in Baltimore, Maryland-January 16, 1842) was an American merchant and early railroad executive based in Baltimore, Maryland.

On February 28, 1814, McKim and seven other gentlemen of Baltimore hosted a dinner for General William H. Winder.

In 1827, McKim was one of the state-appointed commissioners who helped incorporate the Baltimore and Ohio Railroad.

In 1838, McKim was a director of the Philadelphia, Wilmington and Baltimore Railroad, a company formed by the merger of four railroads that created the first rail link from Philadelphia to Baltimore. (This main line survives today as part of Amtrak's Northeast Corridor.) McKim's service as a railroad executive is noted on the 1839 Newkirk Viaduct Monument in Philadelphia.

== Personal life ==
On July 11, 1793, McKim married Margaret Telfair. The couple had at least one child, David Telfair McKim (May 22, 1794, in Baltimore-July 17, 1847), who married Mary Malvina Hawkins.

A granddaughter, Emilie McKim Reed (1840–1924), helped found the National Society of the Colonial Dames of America and was appointed by the governor of Maryland as the state's commissioner to the World's Columbian Exposition in 1893. Another granddaughter, Elizabeth Virginia McKim Hazlehurst (January 26, 1828 – July 31, 1887 in Ellicott City, Maryland), married one of the other men memorialized on the Newkirk Monument, Henry Richard Hazlehurst (March 2, 1815, in Abingdon, Oxfordshire, England-February 21, 1900, in Baltimore), on October 4, 1852, at St. Paul's Church in Baltimore. They had six children.
