= Henry R. Hazlehurst =

American civil engineer

Henry R. Hazlehurst (1815-1900) was an American civil engineer. Long employed by the Baltimore and Ohio Railroad, he also helped build the first rail link between Philadelphia, Pennsylvania, and points south.

Hazlehurst was born in Abingdon, Oxfordshire, England, on March 2, 1815, a son of Richard Hunter Hazlehurst of Mount Holly, New Jersey, and Maria Eleanor Blagden of London, England. In 1819, the family moved to Salem, New Jersey.

In the late 1820s, Hazlehurst served as one of the assistants to Benjamin H. Latrobe, a civil engineer who helped survey the Baltimore and Ohio's routes to Harper's Ferry, West Virginia; and Washington, D.C. Latrobe was let go after the work was completed, and in 1835 became chief engineer of the Baltimore and Port Deposit Railroad, with Hazlehurst again among his assistants. In the late 1830s, the B&PD was merged into the Philadelphia, Wilmington, and Baltimore Railroad, forming the first rail link from Philadelphia to Baltimore. (This main line survives today as part of Amtrak's Northeast Corridor.) Hazlehurst's service as a railroad builder is noted on the 1839 Newkirk Viaduct Monument in Philadelphia, although his name is misspelled.

Hazlehurst married Elizabeth McKim, granddaughter of PW&B executive John McKim Jr.; their children included George Blagden Hazlehurst (1855-1919), an engineer who went to work for the B&O and ultimately rose to the position of General Superintendent of Motive Power.

In mid-century, Hazlehurst and James Murray, another former assistant of Latrobe's, took over the Vulcan Works machine shop in Baltimore and founded Murray & Hazlehurst, a mechanical engineering and fabrication firm. Among other things, the firm built engines for steamships, including the two oscillating engines of the wooden side-wheel screw steamer SS Republic, built in 1849 for Baltimore Steam Packet Company. In the 1850s, the firm cast several 65-foot lighthouses of cast iron for the U.S. Treasury Department, which then had charge of navigational aids, including Biloxi Light, Matagorda Island Light, and the first Point Bolivar Light.

Hazlehurst died on February 21, 1900, in Baltimore.
