= Tullis-Toledano Manor =

Historic house in Mississippi, United States

- Toledano-Philbrick-Tullis House
- Formerly listed on the U.S. National Register of Historic Places
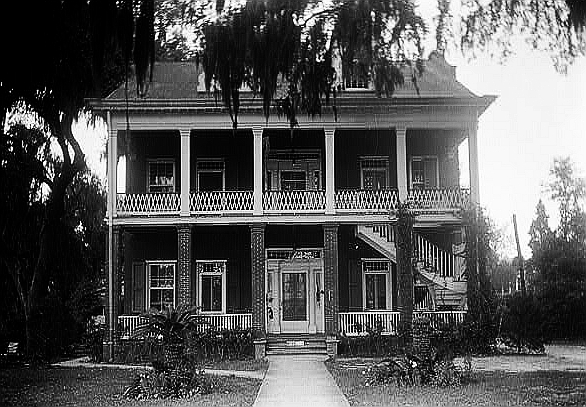
- Toledano-Philbrick-Tullis House 1936

- Location within Mississippi Location within the United States
- Location: 360 E. Beach Boulevard, Biloxi, Mississippi
- Coordinates: 30°23′35″N 88°52′18″W
- Built: circa 1856
- Architect: Christoval Toledano
- Architectural style: Greek Revival
- NRHP reference No.: 76001095

Significant dates
- Destroyed: 2005
- Added to NRHP: November 05, 1976
- Removed from NRHP: July 16, 2008

Tullis-Toledano Manor, also known as the Toledano-Philbrick-Tullis House, was a red-clay brick mansion on the Mississippi Gulf Coast in Biloxi. It was considered an example of Greek Revival architecture. The mansion was added to the National Register of Historic Places in 1976 and was destroyed by Hurricane Katrina in 2005.

== History ==
Christoval Sebastian Toledano, a sugar and cotton broker of Spanish descent from New Orleans, built the house in 1856 for his second wife, Matilda Pradat. The home was a 2 1/2-story, five-bay structure built of red-clay bricks that were manufactured in a Biloxi brickyard. The upper floors were accessed by a semi-spiraled, wooden staircase.

Another structure on the property was a two-story brick kitchen with servant's quarters located approximately 50 yards (46 meters) behind the main house. In the 20th century, the structure was remodeled to serve as a guest house.

After Matilda Toledano sold the house in 1886, there was a succession of owners until 1939, when it was purchased as a summer home by Garner H. Tullis of New Orleans who was President of the New Orleans Cotton Exchange. In 1969, the home sustained considerable damage from Hurricane Camille, and was sealed and vacated. In 1975, the Tullis family sold the house and property to the city of Biloxi. The city restored the house and used it for the next 30 years as a museum and community center.

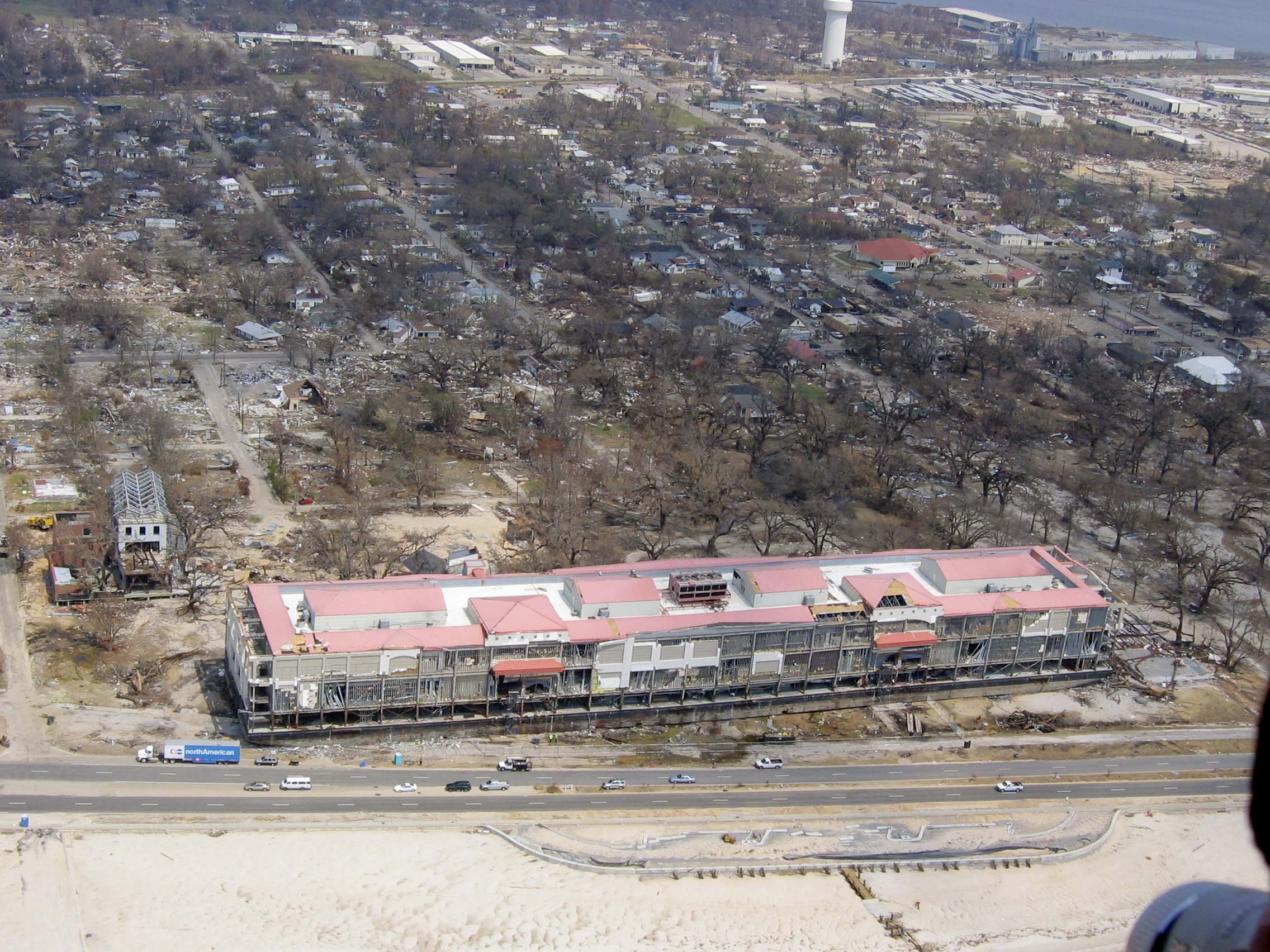
Casino barge that destroyed Tullis-Toledano Manor in 2005

After weathering 150 years of storms from the Gulf, Tullis-Toledano Manor was completely destroyed during Hurricane Katrina on August 29, 2005. A barge from Grand Casino Biloxi washed ashore during the hurricane and crushed the house. Nothing was left of Tullis-Toledano Manor except rubble.

== Councilor oak ==
Located on the east side of Tullis-Toledano Manor was a centuries-old southern live oak (Quercus virginiana) which had the designation of Councilor Oak. The name was derived from local legend that native Indian tribes and French colonials signed treaties under the oak's branches. The tree had a trunk circumference of 21 feet (6.4 meters) and a crown spread of greater than 100 feet (30 meters). Councilor Oak (Crawford-Tullis Oak) was the 45th tree to be registered with the Live Oak Society. The oak was destroyed by the same barge that demolished Tullis-Toledano Manor in August 2005.
