= First Baptist Church of Biloxi =

Coordinates: 30°23′49″N 88°53′37″W

First Baptist Church is a Baptist church located in Biloxi, Mississippi. It is affiliated with the Southern Baptist Convention.

== History ==
The church was founded in 1845, and in 1846 a church was constituted. Rev. J.B. Hamberlin reorganized the church in May 1875 with eleven members. Dr. J.B. Searcy was pastor from 1899 to 1906. On Thanksgiving Day 1900, with the membership growing to 100, a newly red brick building was erected at the corner of Washington and Lameuse Streets. From 1906 to 1908, Rev. Henry C. Roberts was the pastor. Under his leadership, the church was debt free. In August 1924, The church moved to a much larger new building at 917 West Howard Avenue. Rev. Grover C. Hodge was the next pastor of First Baptist Biloxi from 1931 until May 1955, when he retired after 24 years. Dr Joe H Tuten served as pastor from 1955 to 1961. For the past 29 years, Dr. Frank Gunn served as pastor of the church from 1972 until becoming Pastor Emeritus in 2001 then returned as interim pastor in 2007.

The church moved to its present location in December 2000. In addition to a worship center, the campus has office space and numerous classrooms. It also hosts a full service kitchen in the fellowship hall.

The campus also has a youth center that consists of a lounge housing several 42" LCD televisions with various game consoles, an internet cafe a refreshment area, an auditorium, and several additional classrooms.

The church streams its sermons on its website and broadcasts on the local television station WLOX. All ministers occasionally visit schools for student counseling and fellowship. First Baptist has a tradition of a 120-person singing Christmas tree every December. The estimated membership of First Baptist Biloxi is 200
