= Michael Janus =

American politician (1966–2022)

Michael Weston Janus (July 27, 1966 – February 22, 2022) was an American politician.

== Background ==
Janus was born in Charleston, South Carolina, and was born into a military family. The Janus family returned to Biloxi, Mississippi. Janus graduated from Biloxi High School. He received his bachelor's degree from the University of South Alabama and his master's degree in public administration from University of Mississippi.

== Political career ==
Janus served in the Mississippi House of Representatives from 1996 to 2009 and was a Republican. He served as city manager of D'lberville, Mississippi, from 2009 to 2013. He was convicted in federal court of program fraud. Janus died from cancer on February 22, 2022, at the age of 55.
