= Gilbert R. Mason =

American physician (1928–2006)

Dr. Gilbert R. Mason Sr.
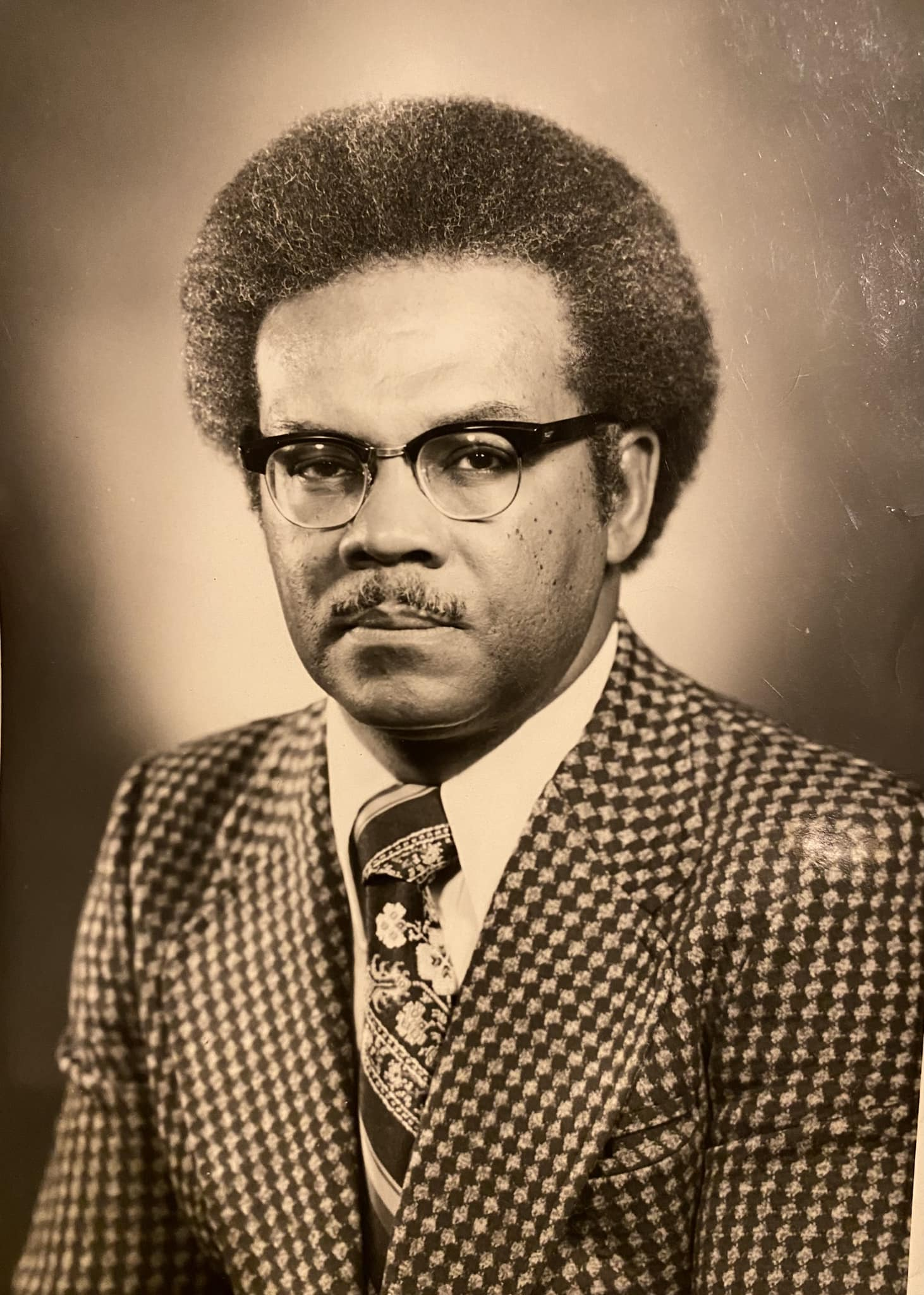
- Born: Gilbert Rutledge Mason; October 7, 1928; Jackson, Mississippi, US
- Died: July 8, 2006 (aged 77); Ocean Springs, Mississippi, US
- Education: Tennessee State University (1949), Howard University (1954)
- Spouse(s): Natalie Lorraine Hamlar (m. 1950–1999) (her death); Gwendolyn Lewis Anderson (m. 2004)
- Children: 8

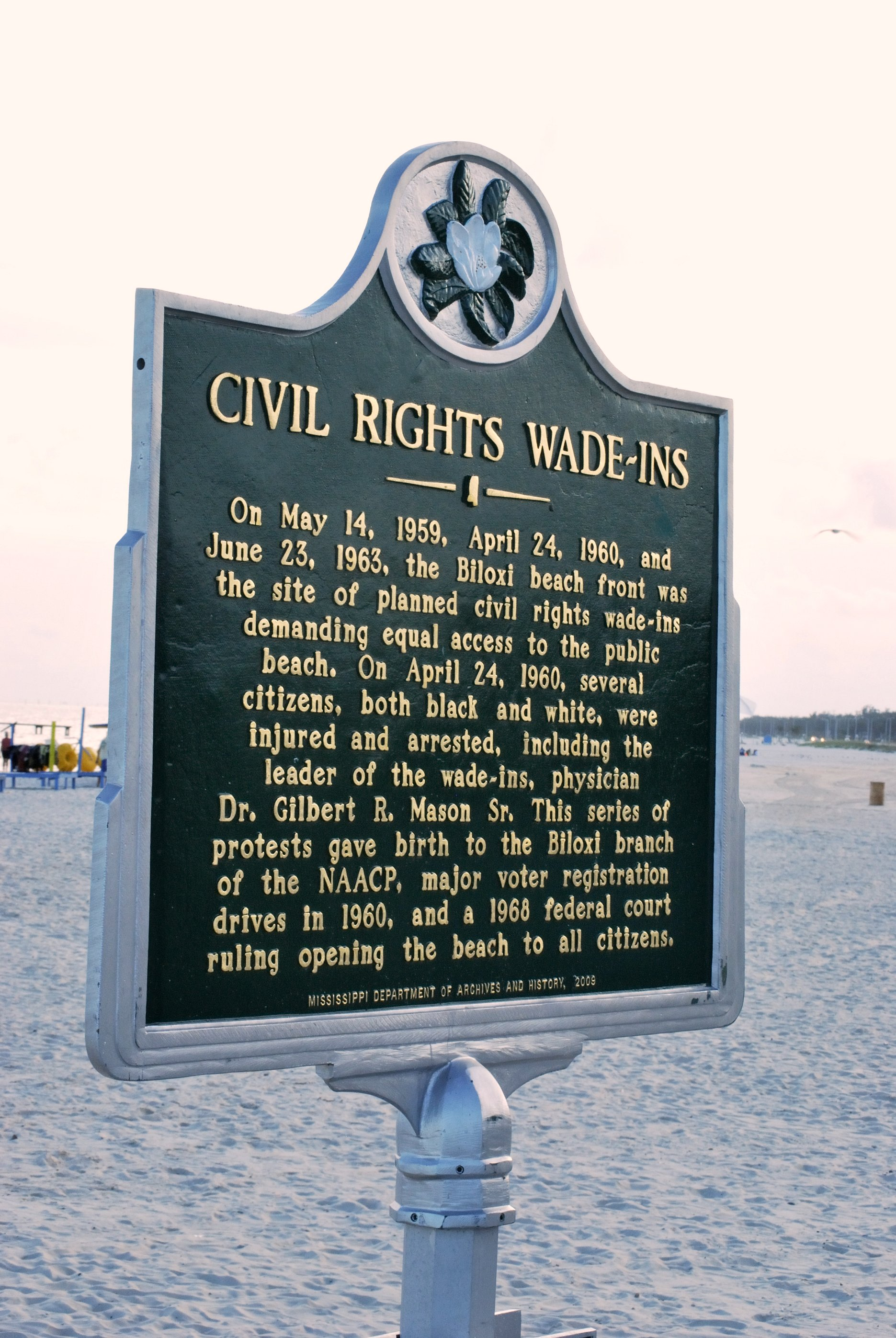
Commemorates wade-ins led by Gilbert Mason which ultimately led to the desegregation of public beaches in Biloxi

Dr. Gilbert R. Mason Sr. (October 7, 1928 – July 8, 2006), was a physician with a family practice, a civil rights leader, and author in Biloxi, Mississippi. He organized three wade-ins from 1959 to 1963 to desegregate the city's federally funded public beaches. This was the first nonviolent civil disobedience action conducted in Mississippi in the 1950s.

After conducting the second protest on April 24, 1960, which was attacked by white mobs, Mason helped found the Biloxi chapter of the NAACP, and was elected president. He served in that position for more than 30 years, as well as head of the Mississippi state NAACP.

In addition to his practice, Mason gained full privileges at Biloxi Regional Hospital and later served as chairman of family practice there. Late in life he wrote a memoir about his early political activities, called Beaches, Blood, and Ballots: A Black Doctor's Civil Rights Struggle (2000).

== Biography ==
Gilbert Mason was born in Jackson, Mississippi, the state capital, to Willie Atwood Mason and Adeline (Jackson) Mason. He received his secondary education at Lanier High School in Jackson, graduating in 1945. In 1949, Mason graduated from Tennessee State University with a BS degree and received an MD degree in 1954 from Howard University, a historically black college. He served his internship in St. Louis, Missouri.

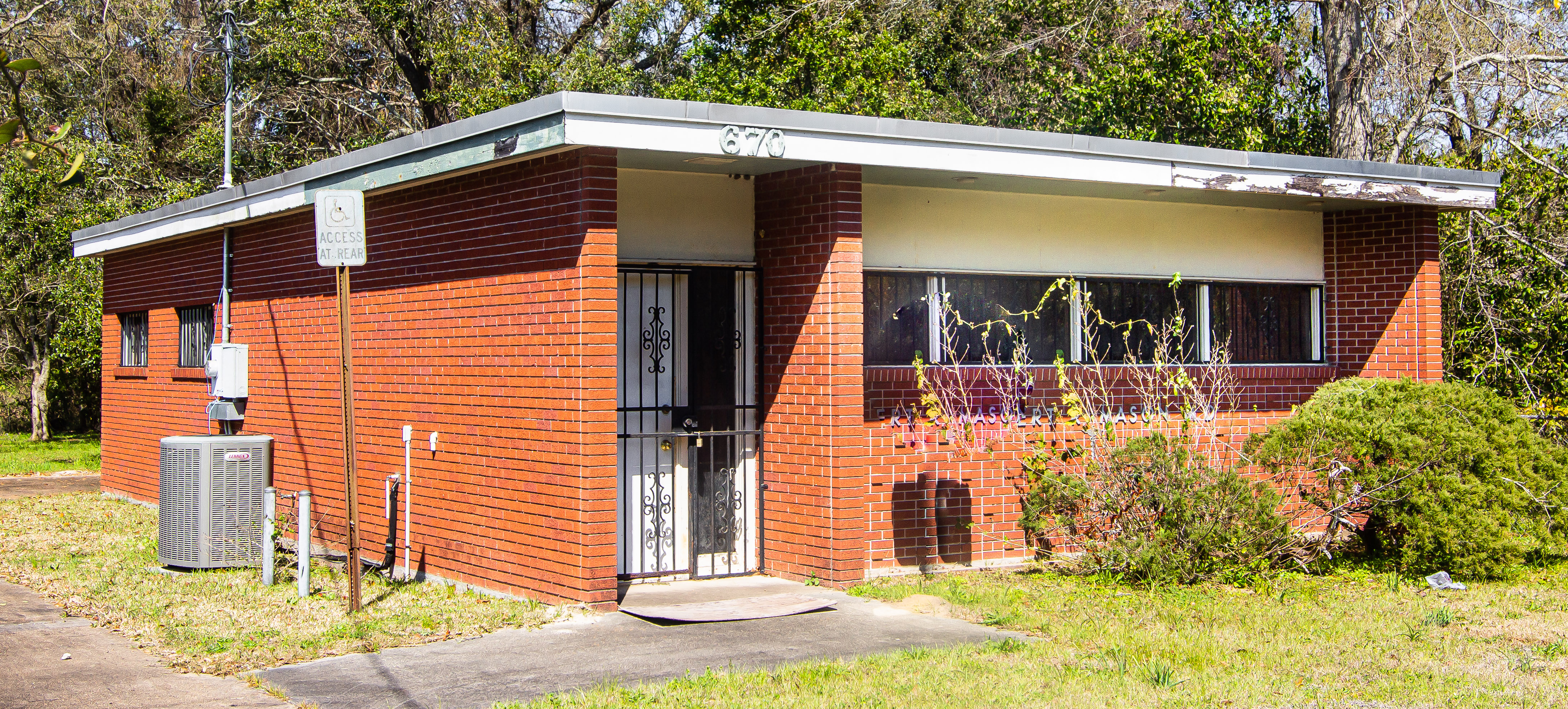
Dr. Mason's medical office in Biloxi

In 1955, Dr. Mason moved to the Gulf Coast and established a family medical practice in Biloxi, Mississippi. He was the second African-American doctor in Harrison County, after Dr. Felix Dunn from Biloxi. Dunn had established his practice in Gulfport, where he also led the local NAACP branch. The two doctors became colleagues.

Mason had married Natalie Hamlar in 1950. They had children together, including a son, Gilbert Mason Jr., who became a doctor like his father. Dr. Mason also had two other sons, David Antony Mason and Adam Atwood Mason in 1977 and 1978 respectively. During his medical career, Mason quickly gained respect, but due to local racial conditions, he did not have full privileges at Biloxi Hospital for 15 years. He eventually became chairman of the family practice section at Biloxi Regional Hospital.

In 1997, Mason suffered a stroke, and his wife Natalie died in 1999. Mason retired from his medical practice in 2002. In 2004 he married again, to Gwendolyn Lewis Anderson.

=== Civil rights leader ===
Dr. Mason is most notable for organizing and participating in Mississippi's first nonviolent civil disobedience action, known as the Biloxi wade-ins, which took place from 1959 to 1963. He and some other men concerned about local conditions set up a Citizens Action Committee, hoping to lessen discrimination. In 1959 he and Dr. Felix Dunn and their families, including children, went swimming at the Biloxi beach to protest the racial segregation of the 26-mile long public waterfront. He and Dunn were taken to the police station and told they could not use the sand beaches, that these were claimed as private property by adjacent homeowners.

In April 1960, Mason returned to the beach and was arrested. When other African Americans learned of this, they expressed their support of him. A week later on April 24, 1960, he and others gathered at the beach in a second wade-in to assert their rights to use the public lands. The group of 125 people included elderly men and women, as well as younger adults, teenagers and children. They were attacked by groups of whites across the beaches, in what became known as "Bloody Sunday". The Biloxi police stood by without taking action.

Mason led a third wade-in protest at the beach in the spring 1963, two weeks after the funeral for Medgar Evers, who was assassinated. The protesters faced a much larger group of nearly 2000 white protesters, but this time the police prevented violence against them. A legal challenge to the segregation had been initiated by the US Department of Justice in May 1960, but had been delayed in getting a court hearing. It was not decided until 1968, when the 5th U.S. Circuit Court of Appeals ruled that Mississippi beaches were public (private homeowners had claimed territory on the beach and into the water) and had to be desegregated by federal law. The state decided against appealing the decision to the US Supreme Court.

== Next actions ==
In 1960, Mason and other activists organized a grassroots effort for a voter registration drive. African Americans had been largely disenfranchised since the turn of the century by the 1890 constitution that imposed poll taxes and literacy tests as barriers. Administration by white officials meant that rulings were subjectively decided against African Americans.

After the wade-in protests, Mason and other activists formed the first chapter in Biloxi of the NAACP; he was chosen as president and served in that position for the next 34 years. Mason also served as president of the Mississippi state NAACP for 33 years.

In 2000, Mason published a memoir about the wade-ins, entitled Beaches, Blood, and Ballots: A Black Doctor's Civil Rights Struggle. It was written with James Patterson Smith and published by University Press of Mississippi.

=== Death and legacy ===
Mason died on July 8, 2006, in Ocean Springs, Mississippi. He was interred in Biloxi City Cemetery, Biloxi, Mississippi.

Mason's contributions to the civil rights movement were honored posthumously in May 2009 and 2010. The state of Mississippi designated a section of U.S. Highway 90 near Biloxi as the "Dr. Gilbert Mason Sr. Memorial Highway." In addition, the state installed historic markers commemorating these civil rights events on the beach in 2009 and at the Biloxi Light in 2010, to mark the 50th anniversaries of two of the wade-in events. The current marker was replaced in 2022 after the original marker was destroyed by storms.

A Head Start center in Biloxi was named for him in 2010.

In 2019, the National Science Foundation announced that its third Regional Class Research Vessel would be named in Mason's honor. The Research Vessel Gilbert R. Mason will have dual homeports at the Port of Gulfport and Houma, LA, and will be operated by the Gulf – Caribbean Oceanographic Consortium, led by the University of Southern Mississippi (USM) and the Louisiana Universities Marine Consortium (LUMCON).
