= Chad Netherland =

American strongman, martial artist and businessman

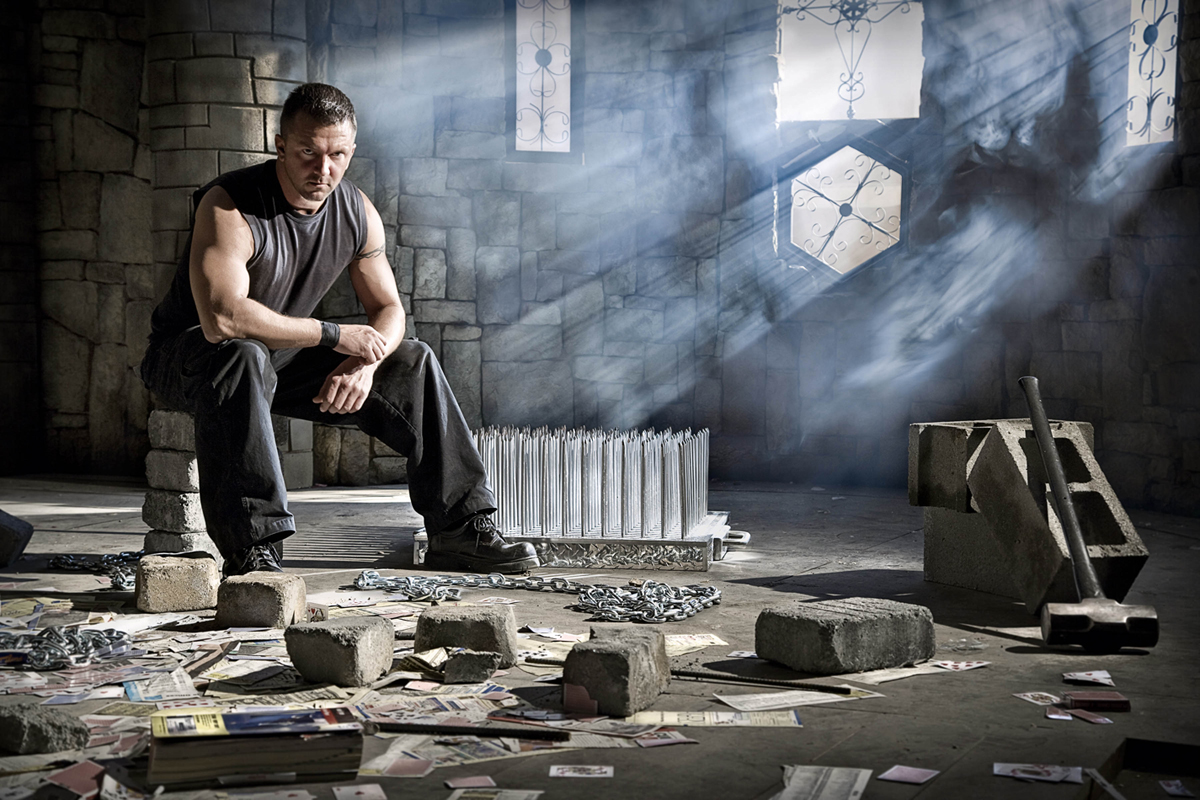
- Netherland in 2009 in Myrtle Beach, SC
- Occupations: Strongman businessman
- Known for: holding the most number of strength-based world records

Chad Netherland is an American strongman, martial artist and businessman. His feats of strength include escaping from a set of handcuffs in 1.59 seconds, holding two planes from takeoff for a little over a minute and breaking 50 blocks of ice in 19.26 seconds.

== Selected world records ==
Below is a list of selected Guinness World Records achieved by Chad Netherland, all of which relate to martial arts and strength.

- Longest time restraining two aircraft – 1 minute 0.6 seconds (Superior, Wisconsin, July 7, 2007)
- Fastest time to escape from a pair of handcuffs (double locked) – 1.59 seconds (Las Vegas, Nevada, January 8, 2011)
- Fastest time to bend 10 nails – 21.13 seconds (St. Louis, Missouri, July 14, 2006)
- Fastest time breaking 50 blocks of ice – 19.26 seconds
- Fastest time to rip ten packs of cards – 46 seconds

== Early life ==
Netherland grew up in Biloxi, Mississippi. His father Dan ran a martial arts studio, and his mother taught at the studio as well.

== Strength ==
Netherland claims to have a "limitless" grip strength. On the set for the episode Unbreakable of the documentary Stan Lee's Superhumans, in which Netherland was featured, biomechanics professor John Mercer of the University of Nevada measured how strong Netherlands grip was using a handgrip dynamometer. Test results showed that Netherland's grip strength was around 20 to 30 pounds stronger than the average human.

He holds ten Guinness World Records.

== Career ==
=== Martial arts ===
Netherland has trained in martial arts since he was a child, and holds an 8th Dan in Aiki-jujutsu, 5th Dan in Kempo, and 5th Dan in Judo.

=== Reality television ===
He has appeared on many reality television programs, such as the documentary Stan Lee's Superhumans, The Rachael Ray Show, and Ripley's Believe It or Not!.

=== Television commercials ===
Guinness World Records: The Videogame (Nintendo Wii and DS)

=== Movies ===
2012 – Vandroid the Movie
