= Order of Mithras Carnival Association =

The Order of Mithras Carnival Association, the oldest men's Carnival organization on the Mississippi Gulf Coast, was organized in Biloxi, Mississippi in 1924, and has held masked balls every year since, except for 1943-1945 (World War II) and 2006 (Hurricane Katrina). The order currently has 150 members. Its masked ball is held on the Friday preceding Mardi Gras every year.
