= Biloxi, Mississippi =

City in Mississippi, United States

Biloxi
- City
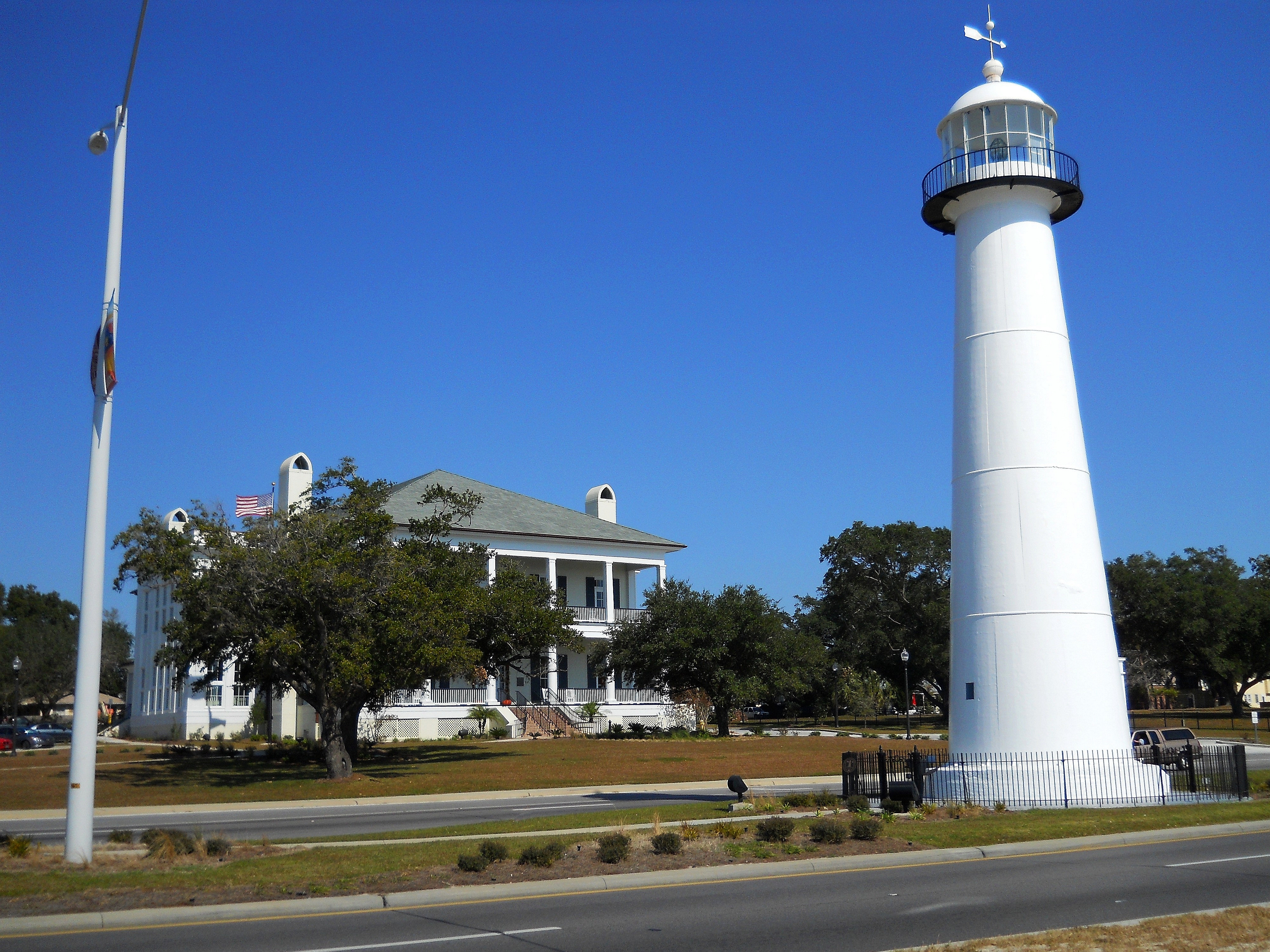
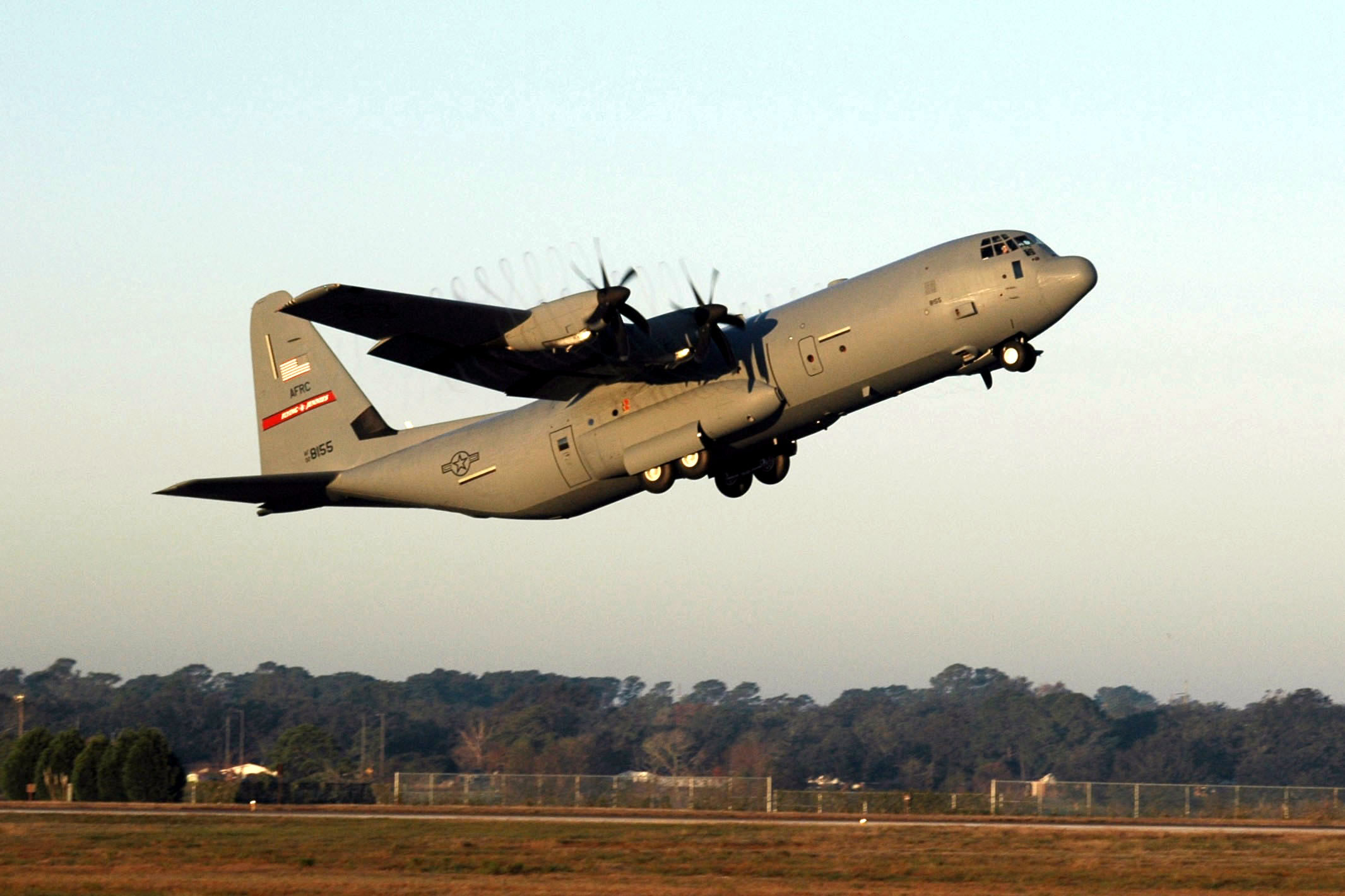
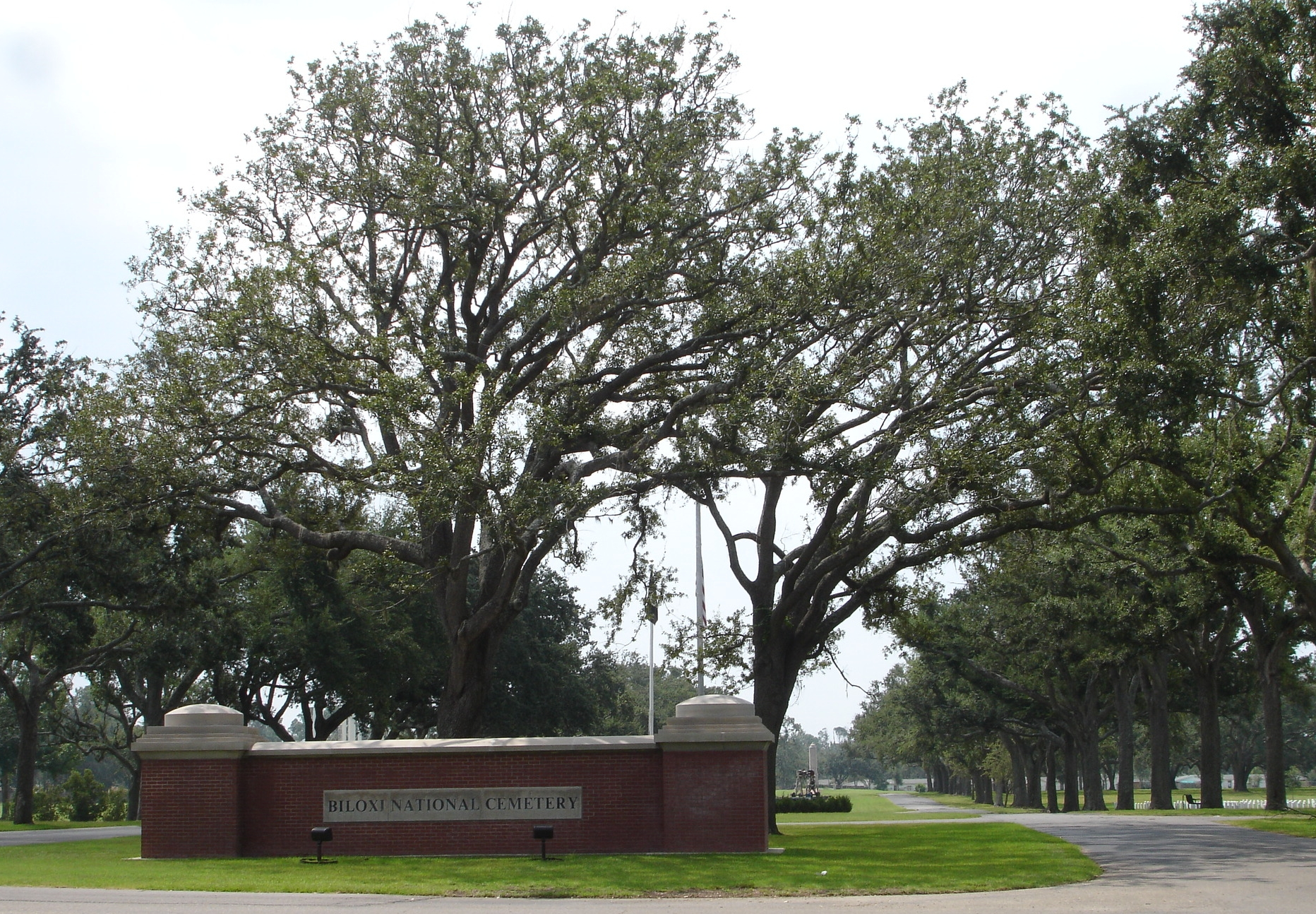
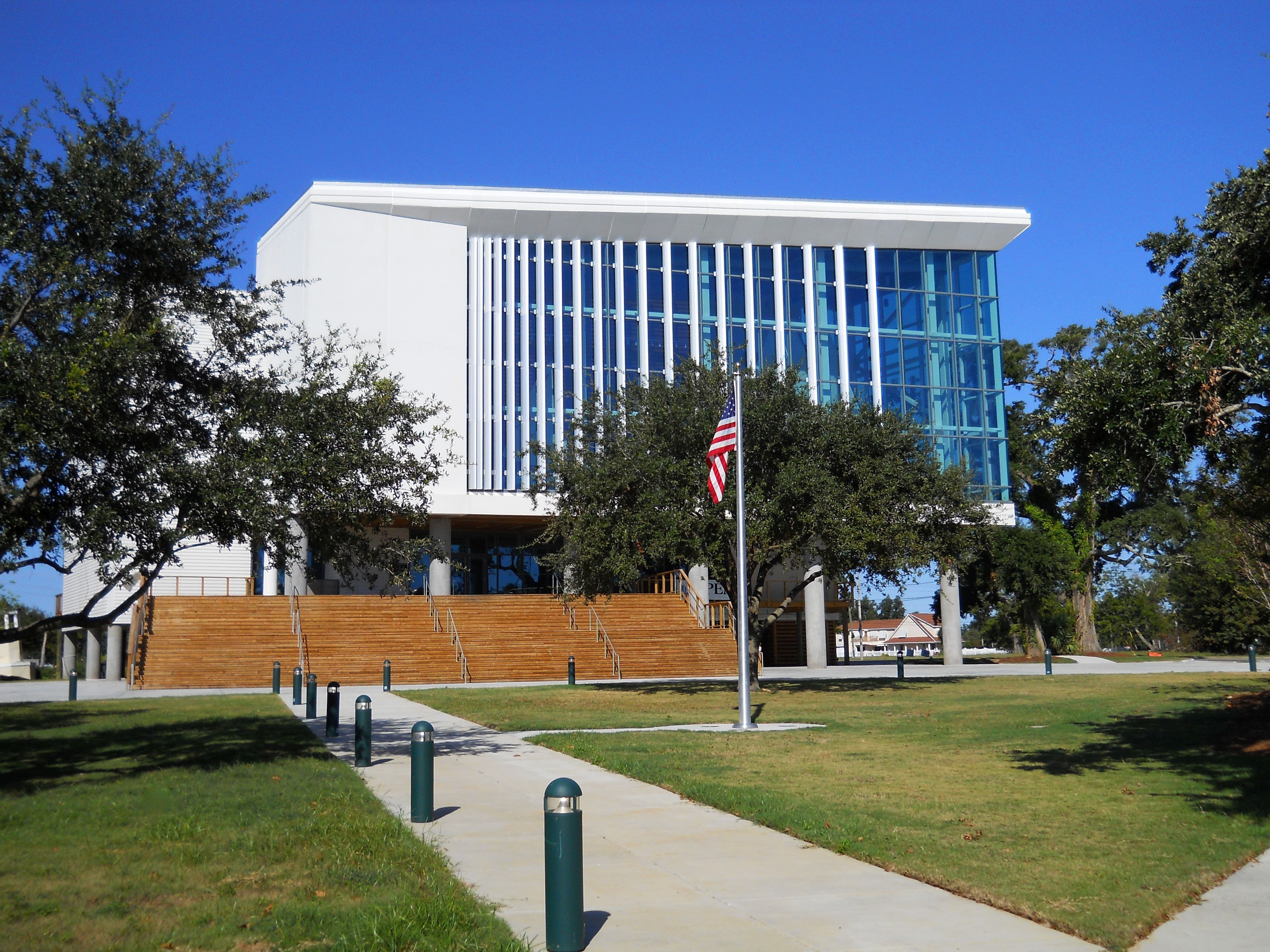
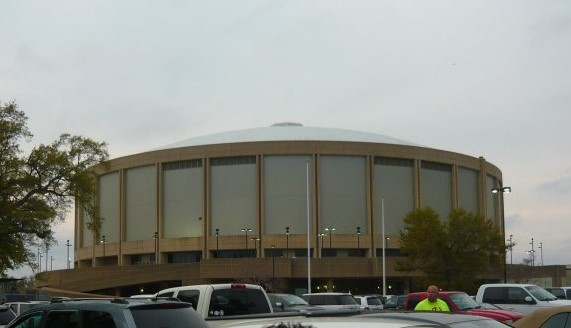
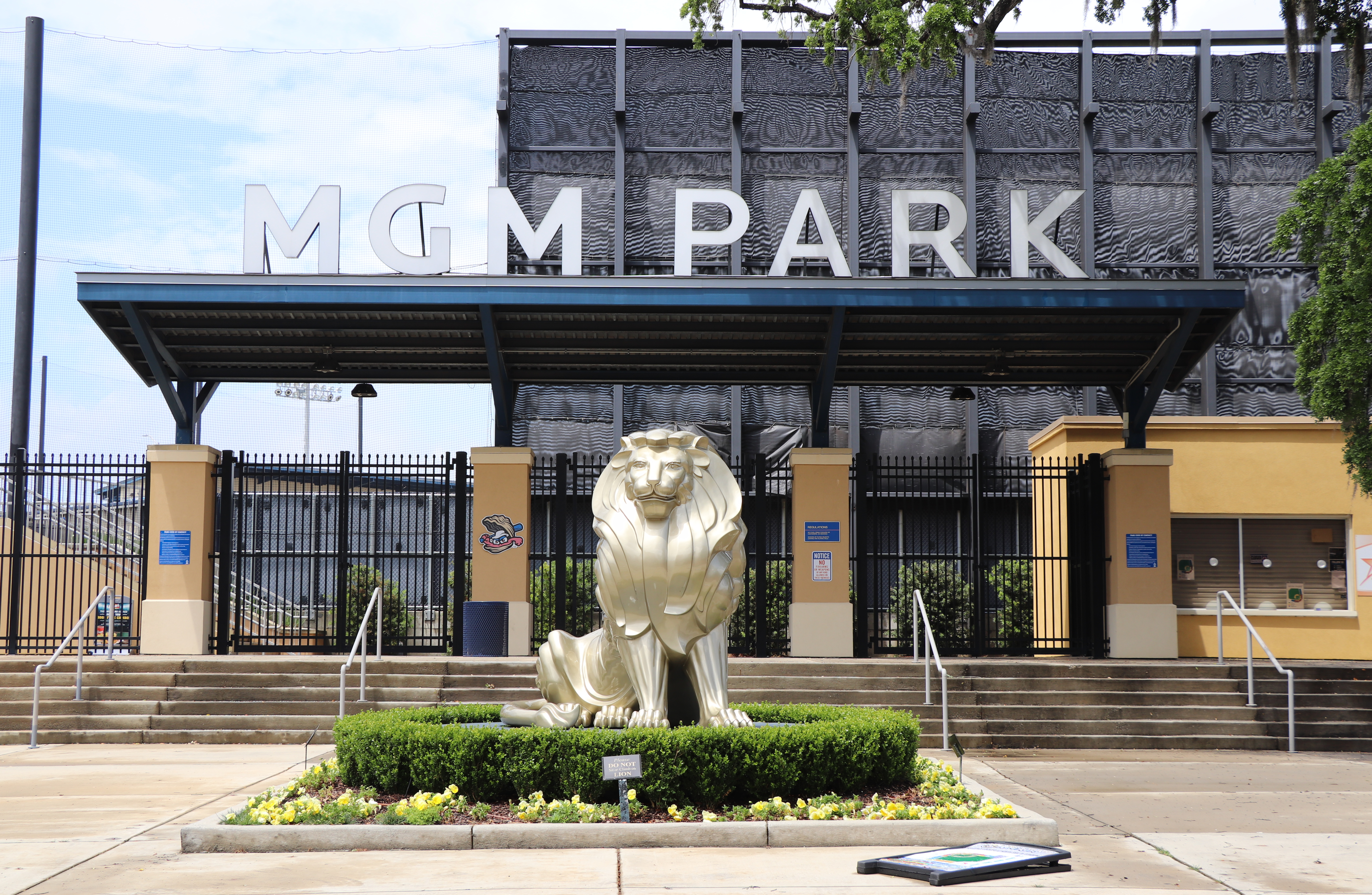
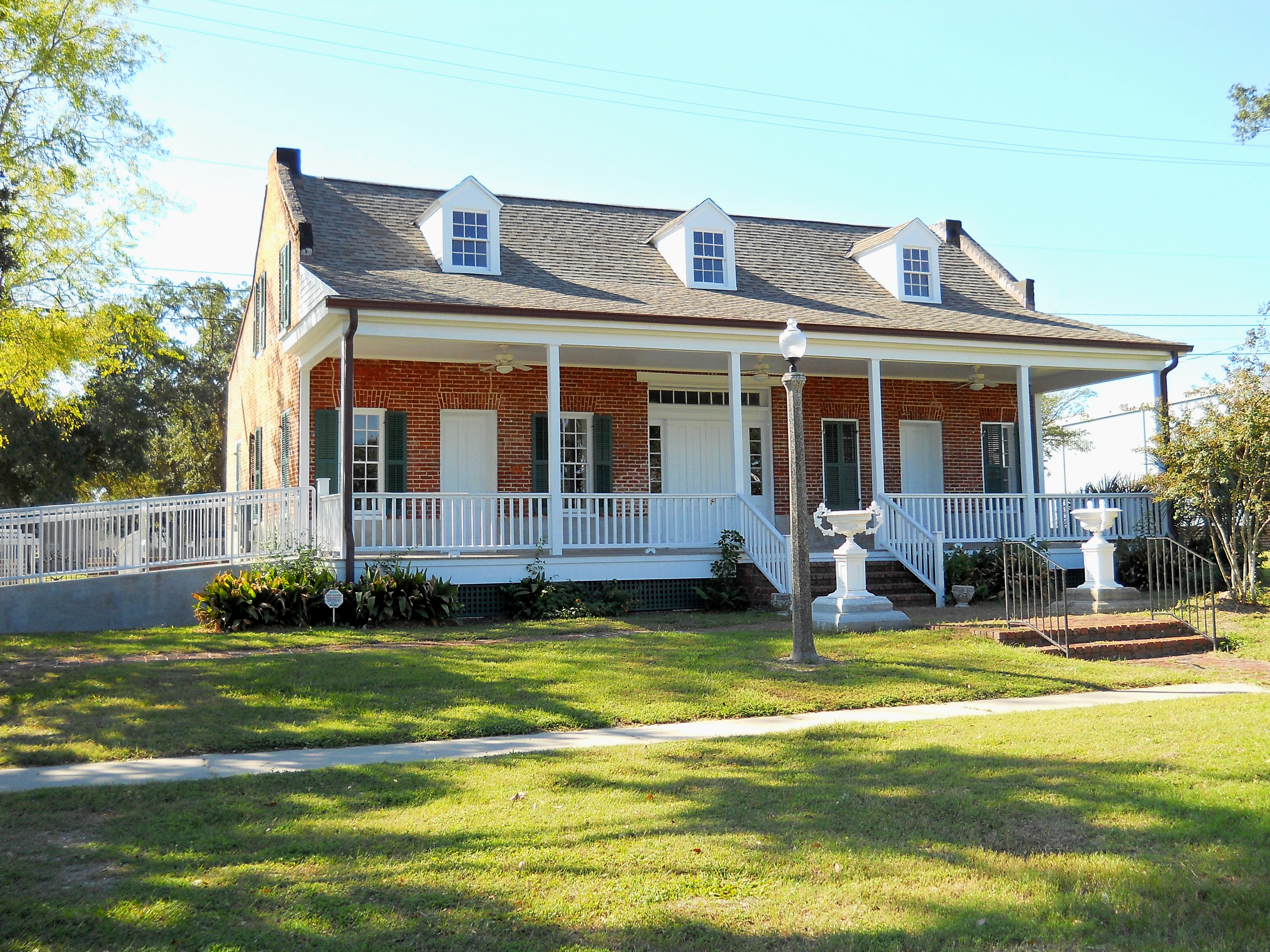
- Biloxi Lighthouse Keesler Air Force Base Biloxi National Cemetery Maritime & Seafood Industry Museum Mississippi Coast Coliseum Keesler Federal Park Old Brick House

- Flag Logo
- Nicknames: “The Playground of the South” "Buck City"
- Motto: "We have a great deal to offer!"
- Interactive map of Biloxi
- Location within Mississippi Location within the United States
- Coordinates: 30°24′43″N 88°55′40″W
- Country: United States
- State: Mississippi
- County: Harrison
- Incorporated: 1838 (as a township)

Government
  - Mayor: Andrew Gilich (R)

Area
  - City: 67.71 sq mi (175.36 km^{2})
  - Land: 42.93 sq mi (111.20 km^{2})
  - Water: 24.77 sq mi (64.16 km^{2})
- Elevation: 20 ft (6 m)

Population (2020)
  - City: 49,449
  - Density: 1,151.7/sq mi (444.67/km^{2})
  - Metro: 416,259 (US: 133rd)
- Demonym: Biloxian
- Time zone: UTC−6 (CST)
  - Summer (DST): UTC−5 (CDT)
- ZIP Codes: 39530–39535, 39540
- Area code: 228
- FIPS code: 28-06220
- GNIS feature ID: 0667173
- Website: www.biloxi.ms.us

Biloxi (/bɪˈlʌksi/ bih-LUK-see; French: [bilusi]) is a city in Harrison County, Mississippi, United States. It lies on the Gulf Coast in southern Mississippi, bordering the city of Gulfport to its west. The adjacent cities are both designated as seats of Harrison County. The population of Biloxi was 49,449 at the 2020 census, making it the state's fourth-most populous city. It is a principal city of the Gulfport–Biloxi metropolitan area, home to 416,259 residents in 2020. The area's first European settlers were French colonists.

The beachfront of Biloxi lies directly on the Mississippi Sound, with barrier islands scattered off the coast and into the Gulf of Mexico. Keesler Air Force Base lies within the city and is home to the 81st Training Wing and the 403rd Wing of the U.S. Air Force Reserve.

== History ==
=== Colonial era ===
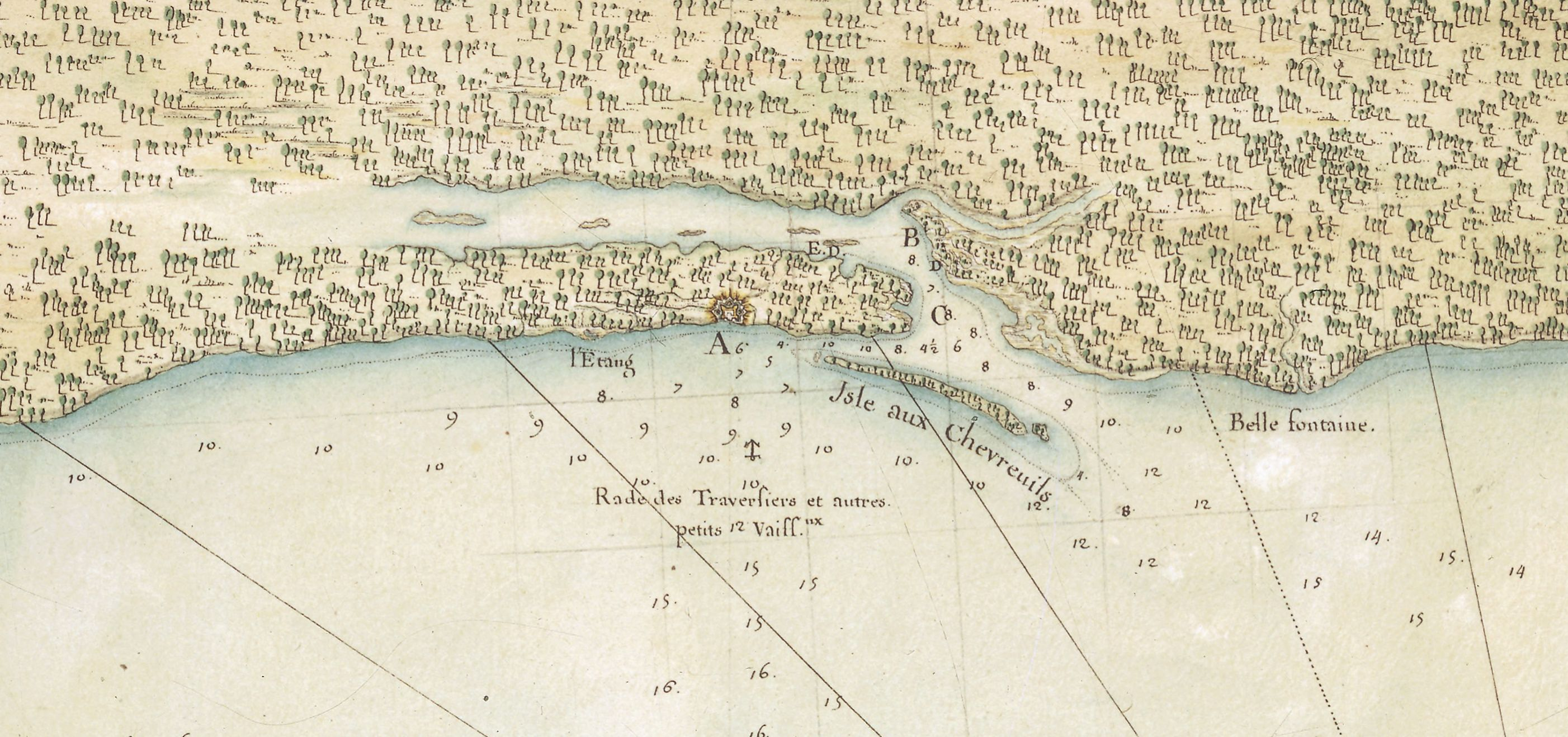
Old Biloxi (site B) and New Biloxi (site A), French map, beginning of 18th century

In 1699, French colonists formed the first permanent, European settlement in French Louisiana, at Fort Maurepas, now in Ocean Springs, Mississippi, and referred to as "Old Biloxi". The settlement was under the direction of Pierre Le Moyne d'Iberville.

The name of Biloxi in French was Bilocci, a transliteration of the term for the local Native American tribe in their language. Labeled along with "Fort Maurepas" on maps dated circa year 1710/1725, the name was sometimes used in English as "Fort Bilocci".

In 1720, the area of today's city of Biloxi was settled for the first time around Fort Louis, and the administrative capital of French Louisiana was moved to Biloxi from Mobile. French Louisiana, part of New France, was known in French as La Louisiane in colonial times. Following the Louisiana Purchase, it has been called La Louisiane française to distinguish it from the modern state of Louisiana.

Due to fears of tides and hurricanes, colonial governor Bienville moved the capital of French Louisiana in 1722 from Biloxi to a new inland harbor town named La Nouvelle-Orléans (New Orleans), built for this purpose in 1718–1720.

In 1763, following Britain's victory in the Seven Years' War/French and Indian War, France had to cede their colonies east of the Mississippi River, except for New Orleans, to Great Britain, as part of the Treaty of Paris. At the same time, the French colony west of the Mississippi, plus New Orleans, was ceded to Spain as part of the Treaty of Fontainebleau.

=== Subsequent history ===
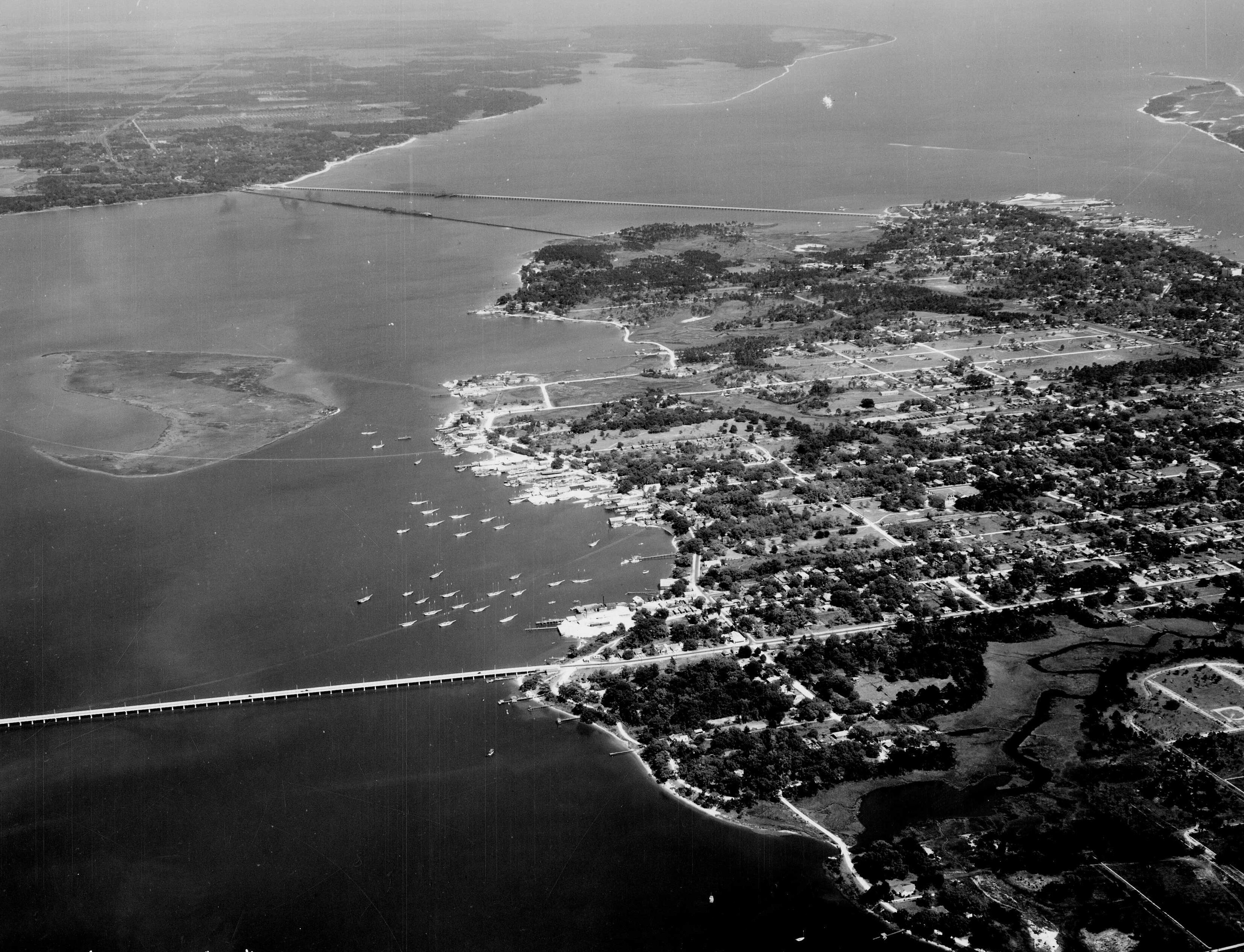
Aerial view, 1932

British rule lasted from 1763 to 1779, followed by Spanish rule from 1779 to 1810. Despite this, the character of Biloxi remained mostly French, as their descendants made up the majority of the population. In 1811, the U.S. traded with Spain to take over Biloxi and the related area, making it part of their Mississippi Territory. Mississippi, and Biloxi with it, was admitted as a state to the union in 1817.

Biloxi began to grow. In the antebellum period of the 19th century, it became known as a summer resort due to its proximity to the breezes and beaches of the coast. It also had the advantages of proximity to New Orleans and ease of access via water. Summer homes were built by wealthy slave-owners and commercial figures, and hotels and rental cottages were developed to serve those who could not afford their own homes.

The Biloxi Lighthouse was built in Baltimore, Maryland, and shipped south, where it was completed at the site in May 1848. (It is one of two surviving lighthouses on the Mississippi Gulf Coast, which at one time had twelve.)

In the early stages of the Civil War, Ship Island was captured by Union forces, enabling them to take control of Biloxi. No major battles were fought in the area, and Biloxi did not suffer direct damage from the war. Some local Union sentiment could be discerned following the war's conclusion.

In the postbellum period, Biloxi again emerged as a vacation spot. Its popularity as a destination increased with railroad access. In 1881, the first cannery was built in the town to process seafood, leading others to join the location. This stimulated development in the city and attracted new immigrants from Europe and various ethnic groups who worked in the seafood factories. They processed shrimp and other local seafood. These changes gave Biloxi a more heterogeneous population.

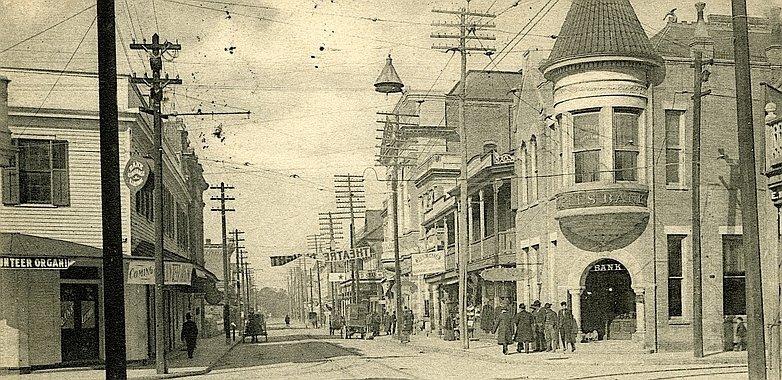
Looking West down Howard Avenue at Lameuse Street, 1906

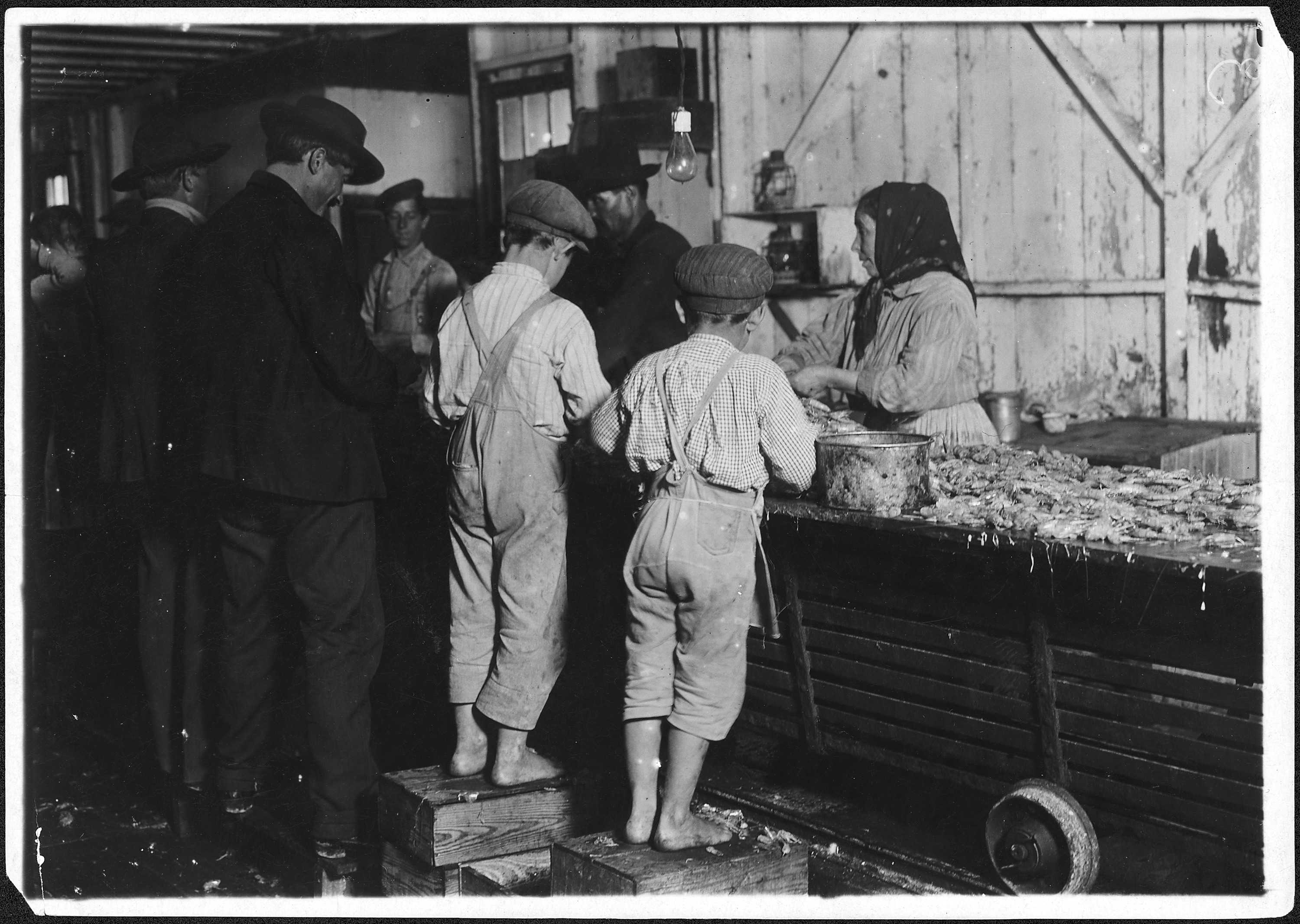
Child laborers picking shrimp in Biloxi, 1911. Photo by Lewis Hine.

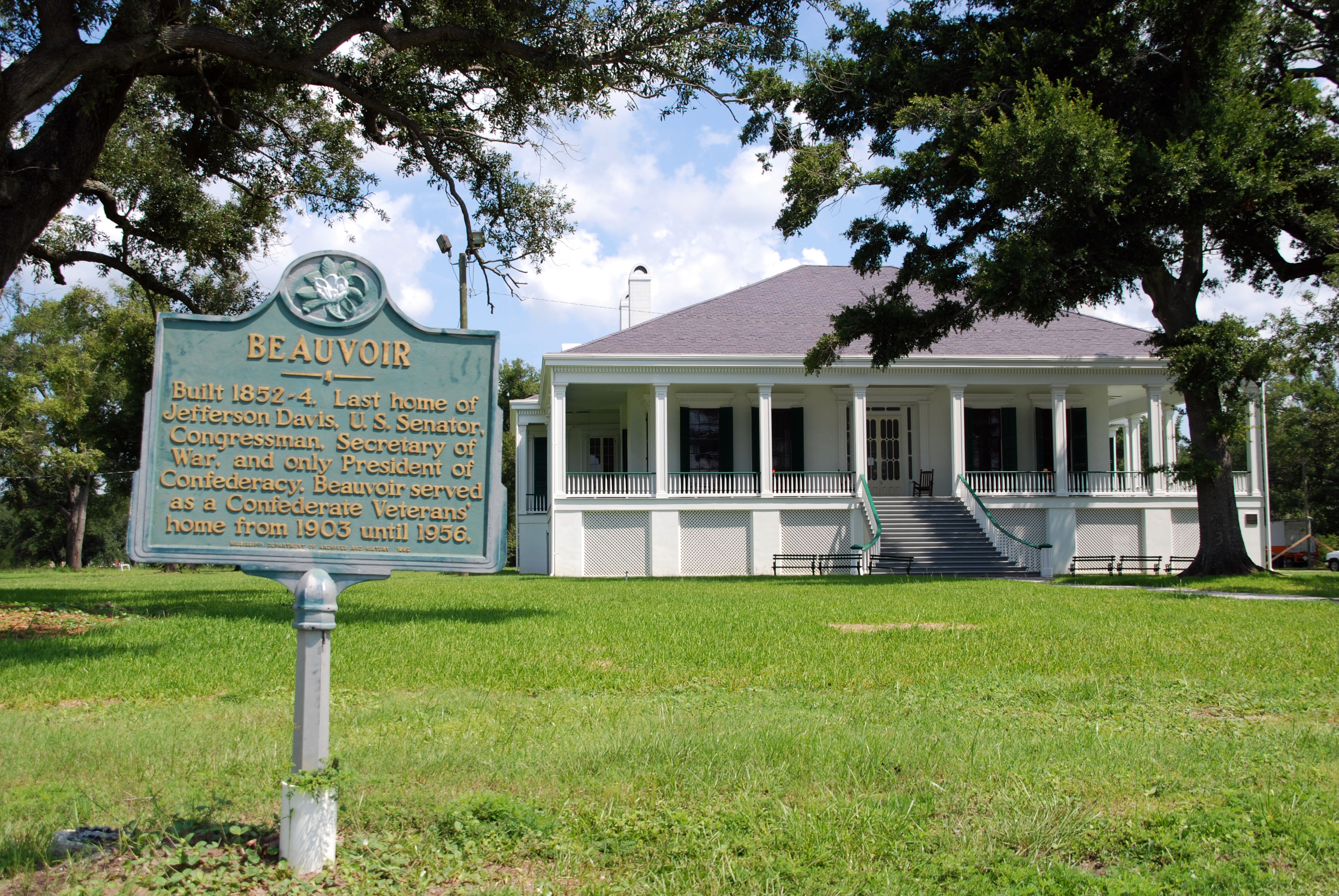
Beauvoir, the post-war home of Confederate States President Jefferson Davis

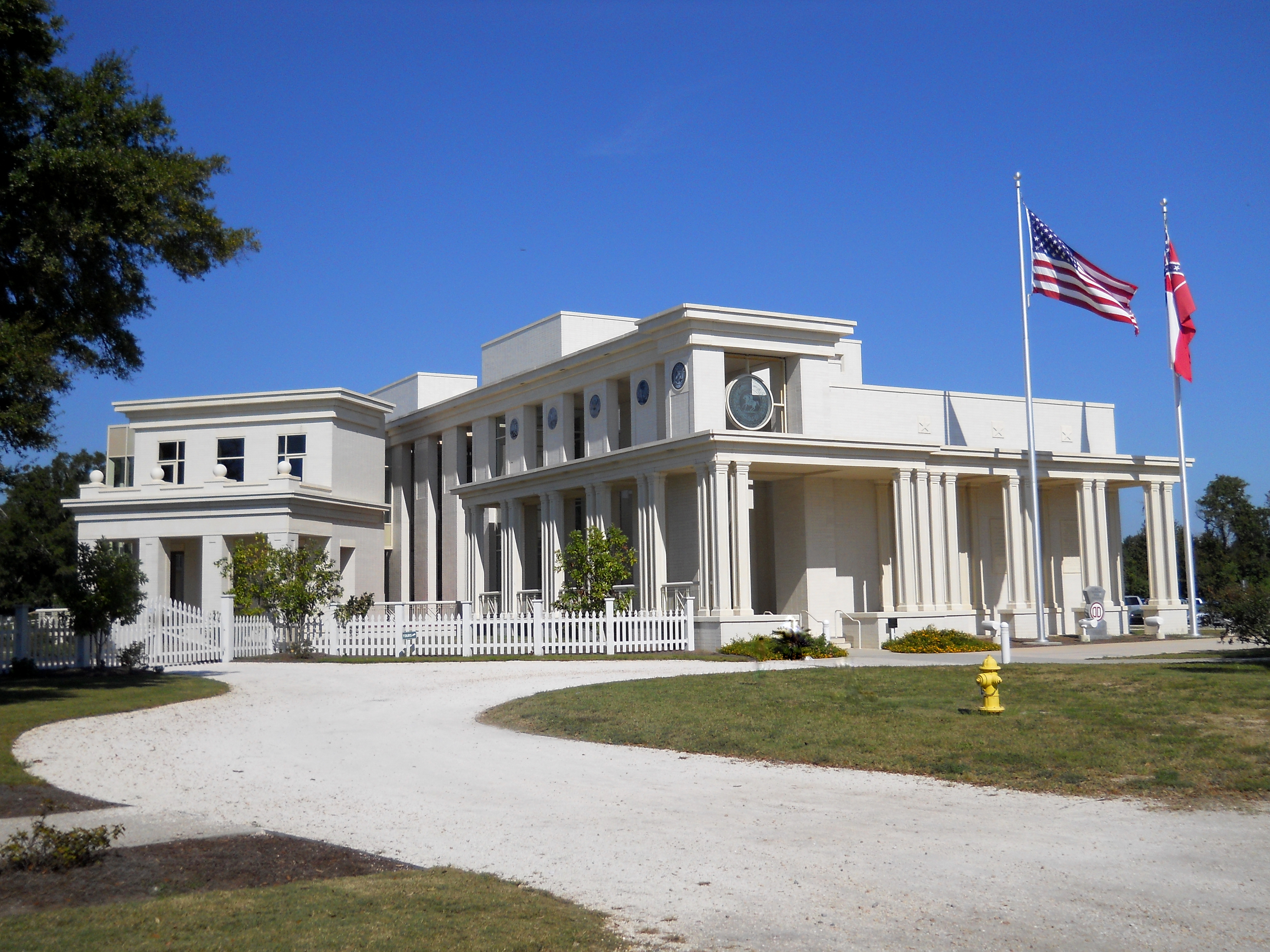
Jefferson Davis Presidential Library and Museum at Beauvoir

During World War II, the United States Army Air Forces built Keesler Field, now Keesler Air Force Base, which became a major basic training site and site for aircraft maintenance. The Biloxi economy boomed as a result, attracting new residents and businesses. By 1958, the first Jewish synagogue had been built in the town.

Biloxi's casino history dates to a period in the 1940s. At the time, open, if technically illegal, gambling took place in a casino within the Broadwater Beach Resort. Open gambling ended during the 1950s. The Mississippi Gulf Coast became known as the "Poor Man's Riviera", and was frequented by Southern families interested in fishing expeditions during the summer. Commercially, Biloxi was dominated by shrimp boats and oyster luggers. The tradition of blessing fishing boats in the US seems to have first taken place in Biloxi in 1929 and has been practiced ever since.

In 1959, Biloxi was the site of "Mississippi's first public assault on racial barriers in its 15-year civil rights struggle." Gilbert R. Mason, a black physician in Biloxi, went swimming at a local beach with seven black friends. They were ordered to leave by a city policeman, who told them that "Negroes don't come to the sand beach". Mason reacted by leading a series of protests, known as the Biloxi Wade-Ins. The protests were followed in 1960 by the worst racial riot in Mississippi history, during which ten people died. Ultimately, the protests led to the desegregation of the beaches of Biloxi.

In the early 1960s, the Gulf Coast again emerged as a prime alternative to Florida as a southern vacation destination among Northerners, with Biloxi a favored destination. Biloxi hotels upgraded their amenities and hired chefs from France and Switzerland in an effort to provide some of the best seafood cuisine in the country. Edgewater Mall was built in 1963. The Biloxi Dragway hosted drag races between 1957 and 1967.

With the introduction of legal gambling in Mississippi in the 1990s, Biloxi was again transformed. It became an important center in the resort casino industry. The new hotels and gambling complexes brought millions of dollars in tourism revenue to the city. The more famous casino complexes were the Beau Rivage casino resort, the Hard Rock Hotel and Casino, Casino Magic, Grand Casino, Isle of Capri Casino Resort Biloxi, Boomtown Casino, President Casino Broadwater Resort, and Imperial Palace. Like Tunica County in the northern part of the state, Biloxi and the surrounding Gulf Coast region were considered a leading gambling center in the Southern United States.

To celebrate the area's tricentennial in 1998/99, the city's tourism promotion agency invited the nationally syndicated Travel World Radio Show to broadcast live from Biloxi, with co-host Willem Bagchus in attendance

=== Hurricanes ===
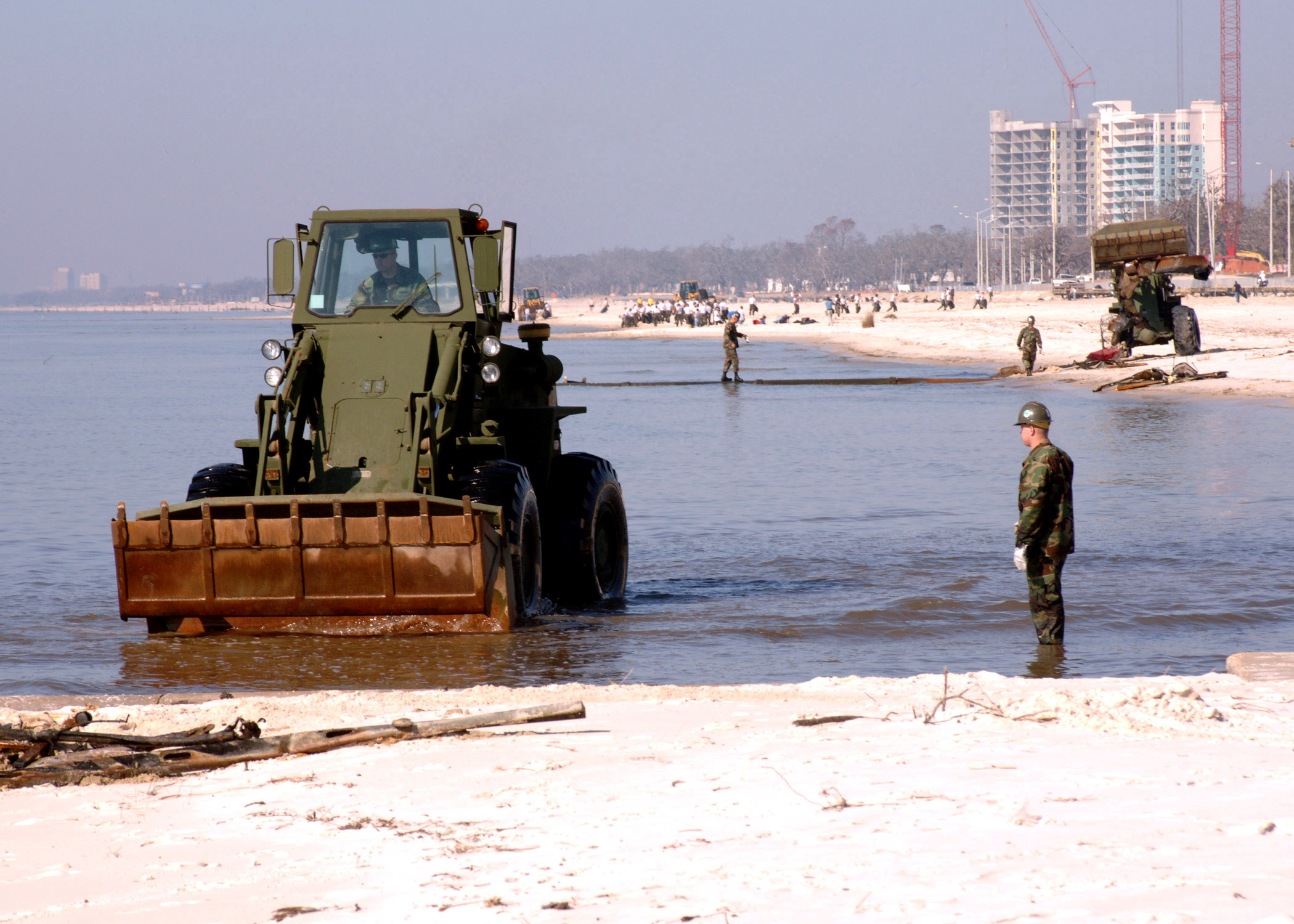
Biloxi beach during cleanup of storm debris

Scores of hurricanes have hit the Mississippi Gulf Coast, but the most destructive, as measured by storm surge levels in the Biloxi Lighthouse, occurred in 1855, 1906, 1909, 1947, 1969 (Hurricane Camille), and 2005 (Hurricane Katrina).

On August 29, 2005, Hurricane Katrina hit the Mississippi Gulf Coast with high winds, heavy rains and a 30-foot (9.1 m) storm surge, causing massive damage to the area. Katrina came ashore during the high tide of 6:56 am, +2.3 feet more. Commenting on the power of the storm and the damage, Mayor A. J. Holloway said, "This is our tsunami." Mississippi Governor Haley Barbour was quoted as saying the destruction of the Mississippi coastline by Hurricane Katrina looked like an American Hiroshima.

Hurricane Katrina damaged over 40 Mississippi libraries beyond repair, breaking windows and flooding several feet in the Biloxi Public Library, requiring a total rebuild.

Biloxi is the site of a memorial to Katrina victims, created by a team of local artists with assistance from the crew and volunteers of Extreme Makeover: Home Edition.

Multiple plans were laid out to rebuild the waterfront areas of Biloxi, and in 2007 the federal government announced it was considering buying out up to 17,000 Mississippi coast homeowners to form a hurricane protection zone. Meanwhile, the city of Biloxi is rapidly implementing plans to allow the redevelopment of commercial properties south of Highway 90.

== Geography ==
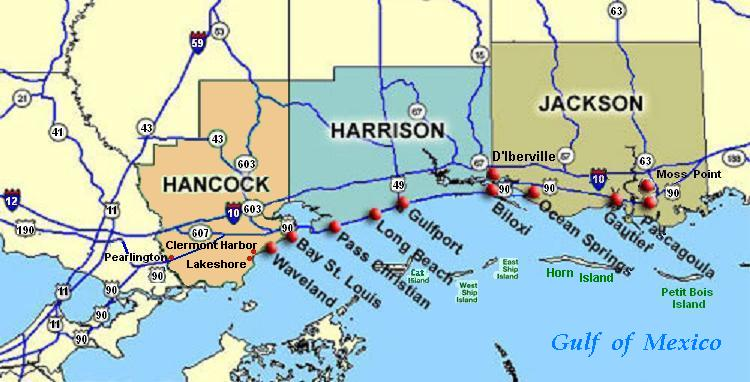
Location of Biloxi, east of Gulfport (center), on Gulf of Mexico

Biloxi is located in southeastern Harrison County, bordered to the south by Mississippi Sound (part of the Gulf of Mexico) and to the northeast partially by Biloxi Bay, which forms part of the Jackson County line. To the northeast, across Biloxi Bay, are the Jackson County city of Ocean Springs and the unincorporated community of St. Martin. The Back Bay of Biloxi continues west from the Jackson County line, crossing the city of Biloxi to Big Lake on the city's western boundary, where the Biloxi and Tchoutacabouffa rivers join. The Tchoutacbouffa flows from east to west across the city and forms part of the city's eastern boundary. Biloxi is bordered to the north and east by the city of D'Iberville and to the west by the city of Gulfport.

According to the United States Census Bureau, Biloxi has a total area of 46.7 square miles (120.9 km^{2}), of which 38.2 square miles (99.0 km^{2}) are land and 8.5 square miles (21.9 km^{2}), or 18.14%, are water.

Biloxi has a humid subtropical climate (Köppen: Cfa) that is heavily influenced by the Gulf of Mexico. Winter days are mild and wet. Snow is extremely rare in Biloxi. Summers are hot and humid, bearing the brunt of tropical storms during the late summer to fall. Biloxi's record low of 1 °F (−17.2 °C) was recorded on February 12, 1899, and the record high of 104 °F (40 °C) was recorded on August 29, 2000, and tied again on August 26, 2023.

Climate data for Biloxi, Mississippi (1991–2020 normals, extremes 1893–present)
Month	Jan	Feb	Mar	Apr	May	Jun	Jul	Aug	Sep	Oct	Nov	Dec	Year
Record high °F (°C)	82 (28)	87 (31)	89 (32)	91 (33)	98 (37)	102 (39)	103 (39)	104 (40)	101 (38)	98 (37)	88 (31)	83 (28)	104 (40)
Mean daily maximum °F (°C)	59.8 (15.4)	63.2 (17.3)	69.3 (20.7)	75.8 (24.3)	82.8 (28.2)	88.0 (31.1)	89.7 (32.1)	89.9 (32.2)	86.9 (30.5)	79.1 (26.2)	69.2 (20.7)	62.2 (16.8)	76.3 (24.6)
Daily mean °F (°C)	51.7 (10.9)	55.2 (12.9)	61.3 (16.3)	68.1 (20.1)	75.6 (24.2)	80.9 (27.2)	82.5 (28.1)	82.5 (28.1)	79.2 (26.2)	70.5 (21.4)	60.2 (15.7)	54.0 (12.2)	68.5 (20.3)
Mean daily minimum °F (°C)	43.6 (6.4)	47.3 (8.5)	53.4 (11.9)	60.4 (15.8)	68.3 (20.2)	73.8 (23.2)	75.3 (24.1)	75.1 (23.9)	71.5 (21.9)	61.9 (16.6)	51.2 (10.7)	45.9 (7.7)	60.6 (15.9)
Record low °F (°C)	10 (−12)	1 (−17)	22 (−6)	30 (−1)	42 (6)	54 (12)	60 (16)	61 (16)	44 (7)	32 (0)	24 (−4)	9 (−13)	1 (−17)
Average precipitation inches (mm)	5.37 (136)	4.37 (111)	5.72 (145)	5.65 (144)	5.25 (133)	7.13 (181)	8.09 (205)	6.93 (176)	5.24 (133)	3.68 (93)	4.36 (111)	5.03 (128)	66.80 (1,697)
Average snowfall inches (cm)	0.0 (0.0)	0.0 (0.0)	0.1 (0.25)	0.0 (0.0)	0.0 (0.0)	0.0 (0.0)	0.0 (0.0)	0.0 (0.0)	0.0 (0.0)	0.0 (0.0)	0.0 (0.0)	0.0 (0.0)	0.1 (0.25)
Average precipitation days (≥ 0.01 in)	9.5	8.9	8.0	7.0	7.1	11.9	13.9	12.7	8.6	6.5	7.3	9.2	110.6
Source: NOAA

== Demographics ==
Historical population
Census	Pop.	Note	%±
1870	954		—
1880	1,540		61.4%
1890	3,234		110.0%
1900	5,457		68.7%
1910	8,049		47.5%
1920	10,937		35.9%
1930	14,850		35.8%
1940	17,475		17.7%
1950	37,425		114.2%
1960	44,035		17.7%
1970	48,486		10.1%
1980	49,311		1.7%
1990	46,319		−6.1%
2000	50,644		9.3%
2010	44,054		−13.0%
2020	49,449		12.2%
U.S. Decennial Census; 2018 Estimate

Biloxi is the smaller of two principal cities of the Gulfport-Biloxi, Mississippi Metropolitan Statistical Area, which is included in the Gulfport-Biloxi-Pascagoula Combined Statistical Area.

=== Racial and ethnic composition ===
Historical racial composition	1970	1990	2000	2010	2019 est.
White	85.6%	74.6%	60.0%	58.0%	62.3%
Black	13.6%	18.6%	35.8%	34.9%	19.9%
Asian	0.4%	5.7%	1.6%	2.0%	3.7%
Native	0.1%	0.3%	0.3%	0.4%	0.5%
Native Hawaiian and other Pacific Islander	-	-	0.1%	0.1%	0.1%
Other race	0.3%	0.7%	1.0%	2.8%	1.0%
Two or more races	-	–	1.3%	1.9%	9.6%

Biloxi city, Mississippi – Racial and ethnic composition Note: the US Census treats Hispanic/Latino as an ethnic category. This table excludes Latinos from the racial categories and assigns them to a separate category. Hispanics/Latinos may be of any race.
Race / Ethnicity (NH = Non-Hispanic)	Pop 2000	Pop 2010	Pop 2020	% 2000	% 2010	% 2020
White alone (NH)	35,292	28,402	28,771	69.69%	64.47%	58.18%
Black or African American alone (NH)	9,569	8,491	10,779	18.90%	19.27%	21.80%
Native American or Alaska Native alone (NH)	232	160	148	0.46%	0.36%	0.30%
Asian alone (NH)	2,558	1,923	2,123	5.05%	4.37%	4.29%
Native Hawaiian or Pacific Islander alone (NH)	50	84	67	0.10%	0.19%	0.14%
Other race alone (NH)	75	68	208	0.15%	0.15%	0.42%
Mixed race or Multiracial (NH)	1,020	1,079	2,668	2.01%	2.45%	5.40%
Hispanic or Latino (any race)	1,848	3,847	4,685	3.65%	8.73%	9.47%
Total	50,644	44,054	49,449	100.00%	100.00%	100.00%

=== 2020 census ===
As of the 2020 census, Biloxi had a population of 49,449. The median age was 37.1 years. 22.6% of residents were under the age of 18 and 16.4% of residents were 65 years of age or older. For every 100 females there were 96.7 males, and for every 100 females age 18 and over there were 95.3 males age 18 and over.

There were 20,052 households, including 10,922 families; 29.9% had children under the age of 18 living in them. Of all households, 37.7% were married-couple households, 22.1% were households with a male householder and no spouse or partner present, and 33.4% were households with a female householder and no spouse or partner present. About 32.7% of all households were made up of individuals and 12.4% had someone living alone who was 65 years of age or older.

There were 22,936 housing units, of which 12.6% were vacant. The homeowner vacancy rate was 2.1% and the rental vacancy rate was 11.2%.

96.4% of residents lived in urban areas, while 3.6% lived in rural areas.

Racial composition as of the 2020 census
Race	Number	Percent
White	29,753	60.2%
Black or African American	10,956	22.2%
American Indian and Alaska Native	261	0.5%
Asian	2,157	4.4%
Native Hawaiian and Other Pacific Islander	75	0.2%
Some other race	2,192	4.4%
Two or more races	4,055	8.2%

=== Religion ===
Places of worship in Biloxi include Cathedral of the Nativity of the Blessed Virgin Mary and the First Baptist Church of Biloxi.

== Economy ==
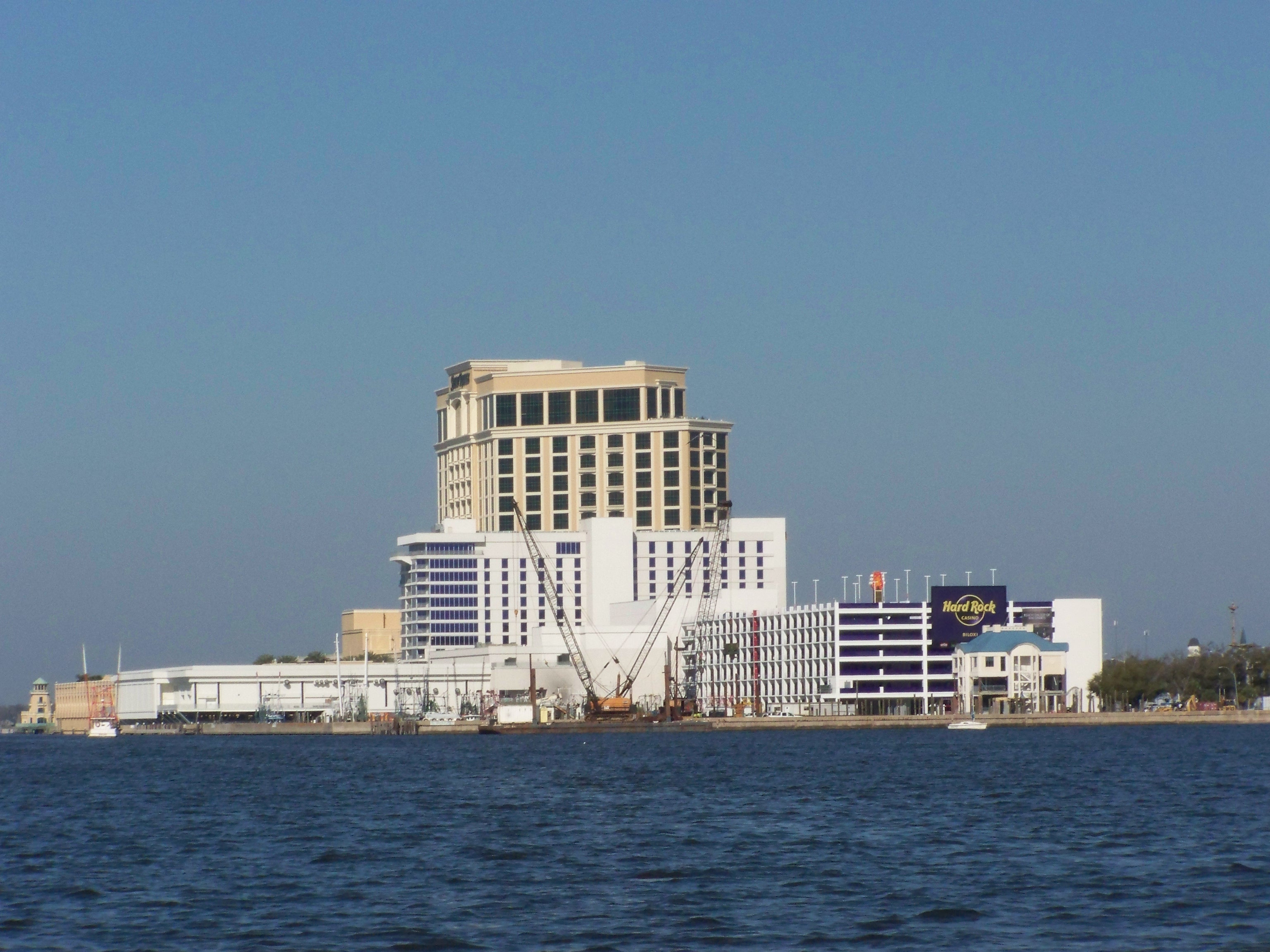
Biloxi casinos

Eight casinos are located in Biloxi. Many casinos were damaged or destroyed by Hurricane Katrina, but reopened. Casinos in Biloxi include:

- Beau Rivage
- Golden Nugget Biloxi
- Hard Rock Hotel and Casino
- Harrah's Gulf Coast
- IP Casino Resort Spa
- Palace Casino Resort
- Boomtown Casino
- Treasure Bay Casino

== Arts and culture ==
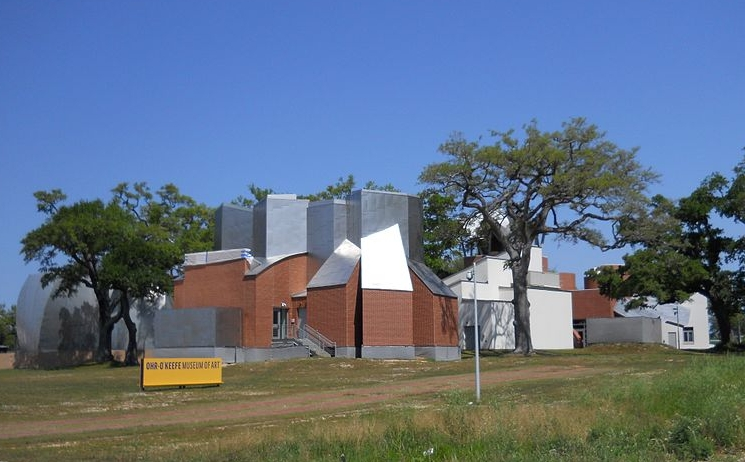
Ohr-O'Keefe Museum Of Art

- Ohr-O'Keefe Museum Of Art, designed by Frank Gehry, opened in 2010.
- Order of Mithras Carnival Association was organized in Biloxi in 1924.
- The Blessing of the Fleet started in 1929, and occurs annually prior to shrimp season to promote safe and prosperous fishing. The event is associated with the Shrimp Festival, as well as ceremonial dropping of a wreath in remembrance of fishermen who have died.
- From 1990 to 1994, the Miss Teen USA Pageant took place in Biloxi.

=== Historic districts ===
Biloxi has six historic districts that are listed on the National Register of Historic Places. The Biloxi Downtown Historic District is a combination of two older districts, the East Howard Avenue Historic District and the Lameuse Street Historic District. Many architectural styles are present in the districts, most from the late 19th and early 20th centuries, including Queen Anne, Colonial Revival, Italianate, Art Deco, Late Victorian, and bungalow.

== Sports ==
Club	League	Sport	Venue	Founded	Affiliate
Biloxi Shuckers	SL	Baseball	Keesler Federal Park	2015	Milwaukee Brewers
Biloxi Breakers	FPHL	Ice Hockey	Mississippi Coast Coliseum	2022	

The Biloxi Shuckers, the Double-A Southern League affiliate of the Milwaukee Brewers play at Keesler Federal Park.

The Biloxi Breakers of the Federal Prospects Hockey League have played at the Mississippi Coast Coliseum since 2022. Biloxi was previously home to the original Sea Wolves team of the ECHL, and the Mississippi Surge of the Southern Professional Hockey League.

Biloxi was the host city of the 2009 Women's World Military Cup.

Biloxi City Futbol Club joined the Louisiana Premier League for the fall of 2016.

== Government ==
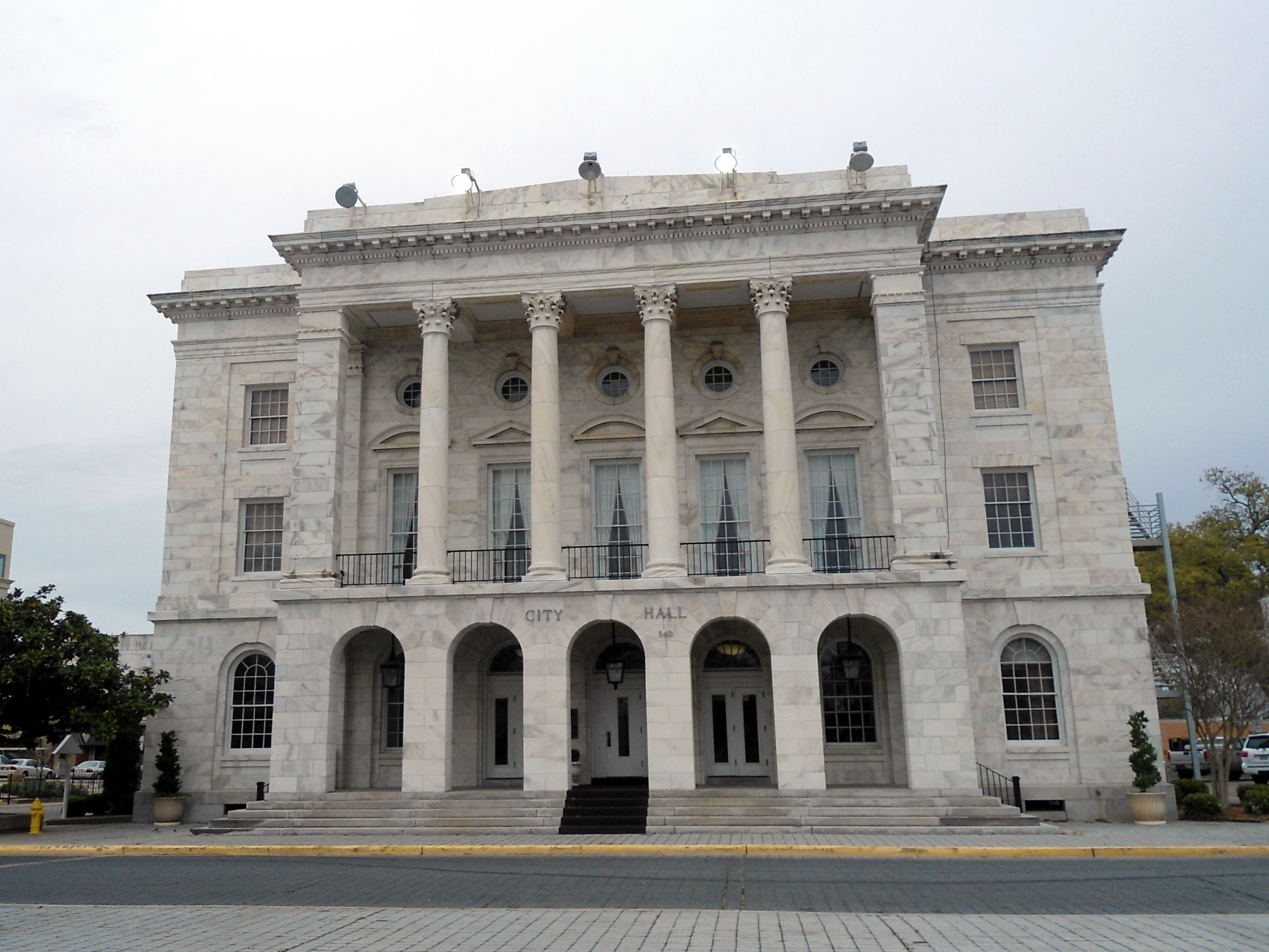
Biloxi City Hall

=== Local government ===
In 1978, Biloxi voters opted to replace the three-person mayor-commissioner system with a city council and mayor. This electoral system enables a wider representation of residents on the city council. The mayor is elected at large citywide. The city council consists of seven members who are each elected from one of seven wards, known as single-member districts.

Various powers rest according to the City charter and the Mayor-Council Form of government outline directed by Mississippi law in the city of Biloxi. The mayor can appoint heads of city municipal agencies, with approval from the city council, create new agencies if their orders are not vetoed or overturned by the city council, and can hire and fire city contractors. The city council is responsible for approving city policy and setting the annual budget.

City Hall, which has been listed on the National Register of Historic Places, is located at 140 Lameuse Street.

Biloxi's current mayor is Andrew "FoFo" Gilich of the Republican Party, who was elected in May 2015 to finish A. J. Holloway's term and elected in June 2017 for a full term.

=== State government ===
Biloxi is represented on the state level within the Mississippi Legislature. In the Mississippi Senate districts, the map divides the city into two sections. The western side of the city is in the 49th State Senate District and seats Billy Hewes, the President pro Tempore (Republican Party). The eastern side of the city comprises the 50th State Senate district and seats Tommy Gollott (Republican Party). In the Mississippi House of Representatives map, the city is divided into three districts. The southeastern side of the city reside in House District 115 and is represented by Randall Patterson (Democratic Party). The northeastern portion of the city makes up the entirety of House District 116 and is represented by Steven Palazzo (Republican Party). The southwestern portion of the city lies within House District 117 and is represented by Michael Janus (Republican Party). The Bolton State Office Building in Biloxi includes the headquarters of the Mississippi Department of Marine Resources and the South Regional Office of the Mississippi Department of Environmental Quality.

=== Federal government ===
The entire city of Biloxi is part of Mississippi's 4th congressional district. U.S. Representative Mike Ezell, a Republican, has served since 2023. He has been Chairman of the Subcommittee on Coast Guard and Maritime Transportation and a member of the Committee on Transportation and Infrastructure since 2023.

The United States Postal Service operates the Biloxi, West Biloxi, CPU Triangle, and Keesler Air Force Base post offices.

== Education ==
The city is served by the Biloxi Public School District and the Harrison County School District. The Gulf Coast has a large Catholic school system, 15 of which are in Biloxi. Mississippi State University also operates a campus in the city. As of the Fall 2008 semester, 763 students from 33 counties throughout the state and several in Alabama attended the college.

== Media ==
Biloxi has one daily newspaper, the Sun Herald, which is headquartered in nearby Gulfport.

20 FM and 7 AM radio stations operate in and/or serve the Biloxi area.

According to Nielsen Media Research, the Biloxi market, as of the 2015–2016 season, is the third largest of five television markets in Mississippi, and the 158th largest in the country. Three major television stations serve the Biloxi area. ABC and CBS affiliate WLOX 13 and PBS/MPB member station WMAH-TV 19 are located in Biloxi, while Fox/MyNetworkTV affiliate WXXV-TV 25 is located in Gulfport. In addition to the stations' main programming, WLOX and WXXV-TV broadcast programming from other networks on digital subchannels. WLOX-DT2 serves as the market's CBS affiliate, while WXXV-TV operates the market's respective NBC and CW affiliates on DT2 and DT3.

=== Filming location ===
Several films have been produced in Biloxi, including:

- Stone Cold, 1991 film starring Brian Bosworth.
- Mississippi Masala, 1992 film starring Denzel Washington.
- Arsenal, 2017 film starring Adrian Grenier, John Cusack, and Nicolas Cage.
- Vanquish, 2021 film starring Morgan Freeman and Ruby Rose.

== Infrastructure ==
=== Transportation ===
Biloxi is served by the Gulfport-Biloxi International Airport in Gulfport. Amtrak service also began serving the city when the Mardi Gras Service debuted on August 18, 2025.

The Coast Transit Authority provides bus service to the region with fixed-route and paratransit services.

Biloxi's main highway is U.S. Highway 90 (Beach Boulevard), which runs along the beach and by the casinos. It connects the city to Gulfport and points westward and to Ocean Springs and Pascagoula to the east. The Biloxi Bay Bridge, connecting Biloxi and Ocean Springs, was rebuilt after Hurricane Katrina, and was fully reopened in April 2008.

Interstate 10 passes through the northern sections of the city, leading west 85 miles (137 km) to New Orleans and east 60 miles (97 km) to Mobile, Alabama. Interstate 110 splits off from I-10 at D'Iberville and heads south across the Back Bay of Biloxi to U.S. 90 near Beau Rivage, providing the city with an important hurricane evacuation route.

North–south highways serving the area include:

- Mississippi Highway 15 (runs concurrently with I-110 for the first few miles)
- Mississippi Highway 67

== Notable people ==
- Jessica Alba, model and actress, lived in Biloxi while her father was stationed at Keesler Air Force Base
- Lionel Antoine, Chicago Bears third overall pick in 1972 NFL Draft
- Laura Bailey, voice actress and the wife of Travis Willingham
- Matt Barlow, heavy metal singer
- Alan Belcher, MMA fighter with UFC
- Belladonna, retired pornographic actress, director, producer, and model
- Jimmy Bertrand, jazz drummer
- Malcolm Brown, NFL running back for Los Angeles Rams
- Hector Camacho, world champion boxer
- Isaiah Canaan, NBA point guard, KK Crvena zvezda
- Chris Carson, NFL running back for Seattle Seahawks
- Gary Collins, actor and television personality
- Jefferson Davis, U.S. Army general and West Point graduate; U.S. Secretary of War (Defense); only president of Confederate States of America
- Gwen Dickey, singer best known as the front-woman of the R&B band Rose Royce
- Ronald Dupree, professional basketball player
- Leonard Fairley, football player
- Damion Fletcher, University of Southern Mississippi running back
- Jeff Gann, professional wrestler known as "The Gambler"
- Mary S. Graham, academic administrator
- Fred Haise, Apollo 13 and Space Shuttle Enterprise astronaut
- Ted Hawkins, singer-songwriter
- Michael Janus, Mississippi state legislator
- Tim Jones (American football), wide receiver NFL player for Jacksonville Jaguars
- Chris LeDoux, country singer
- Barry Lyons, catcher for New York Mets
- James Millhollin, character actor, died in Biloxi in 1993
- Mark Miloscia, former Washington State Senator
- Mary Ann Mobley, actress and Miss America
- Russell D. Moore, President of the Ethics & Religious Liberty Commission (ERLC)
- Francis D. Moran, third director of NOAA Commissioned Officer Corps
- Jack Nelson, Pulitzer Prize-winning journalist who began career at Biloxi Daily Herald
- Chad Netherland, strongman and Gunness World Record holder
- George E. Ohr, groundbreaking potter and father of American Abstract-Expressionism movement
- Mathieu Olivier, ice hockey player
- Chuck Pfarrer, former Navy SEAL, Hollywood screenwriter, New York Times best selling author, novelist
- Eric Roberts, Oscar-nominated actor, brother of Oscar-winning actress Julia Roberts, and father of actress Emma Roberts
- Wes Shivers, NFL player for Tennessee Titans and mixed martial artist
- John Kennedy Toole, author of A Confederacy of Dunces, committed suicide in Biloxi in 1969
- Brenda Venus, model and actress

== In popular culture ==
- Biloxi is the setting of Neil Simon's play and film Biloxi Blues.
- Biloxi is the setting for the John Grisham novels The Runaway Jury (1996), The Partner (1997) and The Boys from Biloxi (2022).
- In 1995, Jimmy Buffett released the album Biloxi.

== See also ==
- Dixie Mafia
- Historic Grand Hotels on the Mississippi Gulf Coast
- Pete Halat
- Pleasant Reed House
- Seashore Campground School
- Tullis-Toledano Manor
- USS Biloxi
