= Biloxi Lighthouse =

Lighthouse in Mississippi, United States

Biloxi Light
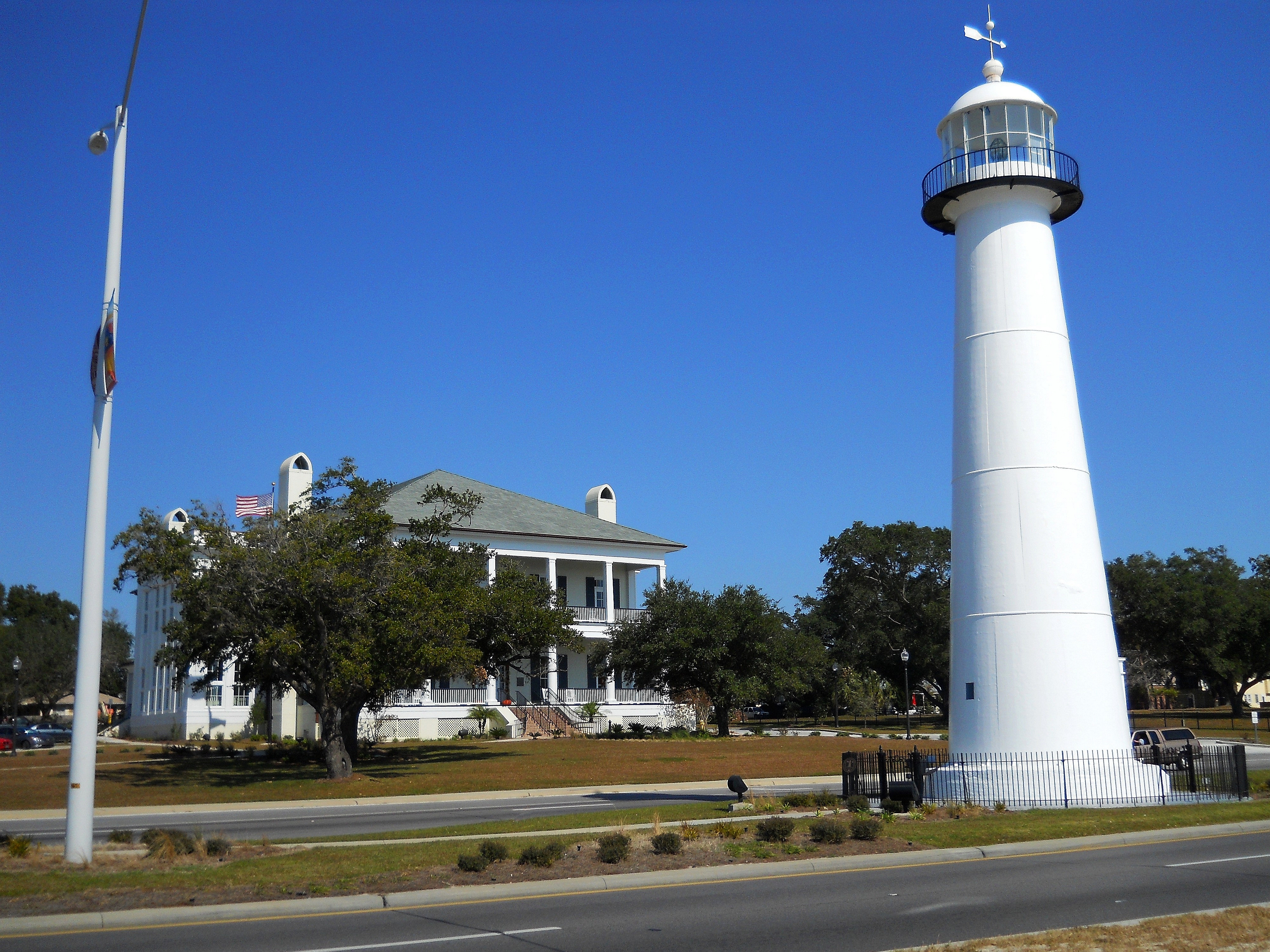
- Location: Biloxi, United States
- Coordinates: 30°23′41″N 88°54′05″W

Tower
- Construction: brick (foundation), brick (backing), cast iron (tower)
- Automated: 1941
- Height: 18.5 m (61 ft)
- Shape: truncated cone
- Markings: White (tower), black (balustrade)
- Heritage: National Register of Historic Places listed place, Mississippi Landmark

Light
- First lit: 1848
- Focal height: 18.5 m (61 ft)
- Lens: fourth order Fresnel lens (1848–), fifth order Fresnel lens (1926–)
- Characteristic: Oc W 4s
- Biloxi Lighthouse
- U.S. National Register of Historic Places
- Mississippi Landmark
- Architect: Murray & Hazlehurst
- NRHP reference No.: 73001012
- USMS No.: 047-BLX-1175-NR-ML

Significant dates
- Added to NRHP: October 3, 1973
- Designated USMS: June 10, 1987

Biloxi Lighthouse is a lighthouse in Biloxi, Mississippi, adjacent to the Mississippi Sound of the Gulf of Mexico. The lighthouse has been maintained by female keepers for more years than any other lighthouse in the United States. It was listed on the National Register of Historic Places in 1973 and declared a Mississippi Landmark in 1987.

== Authorization and construction ==
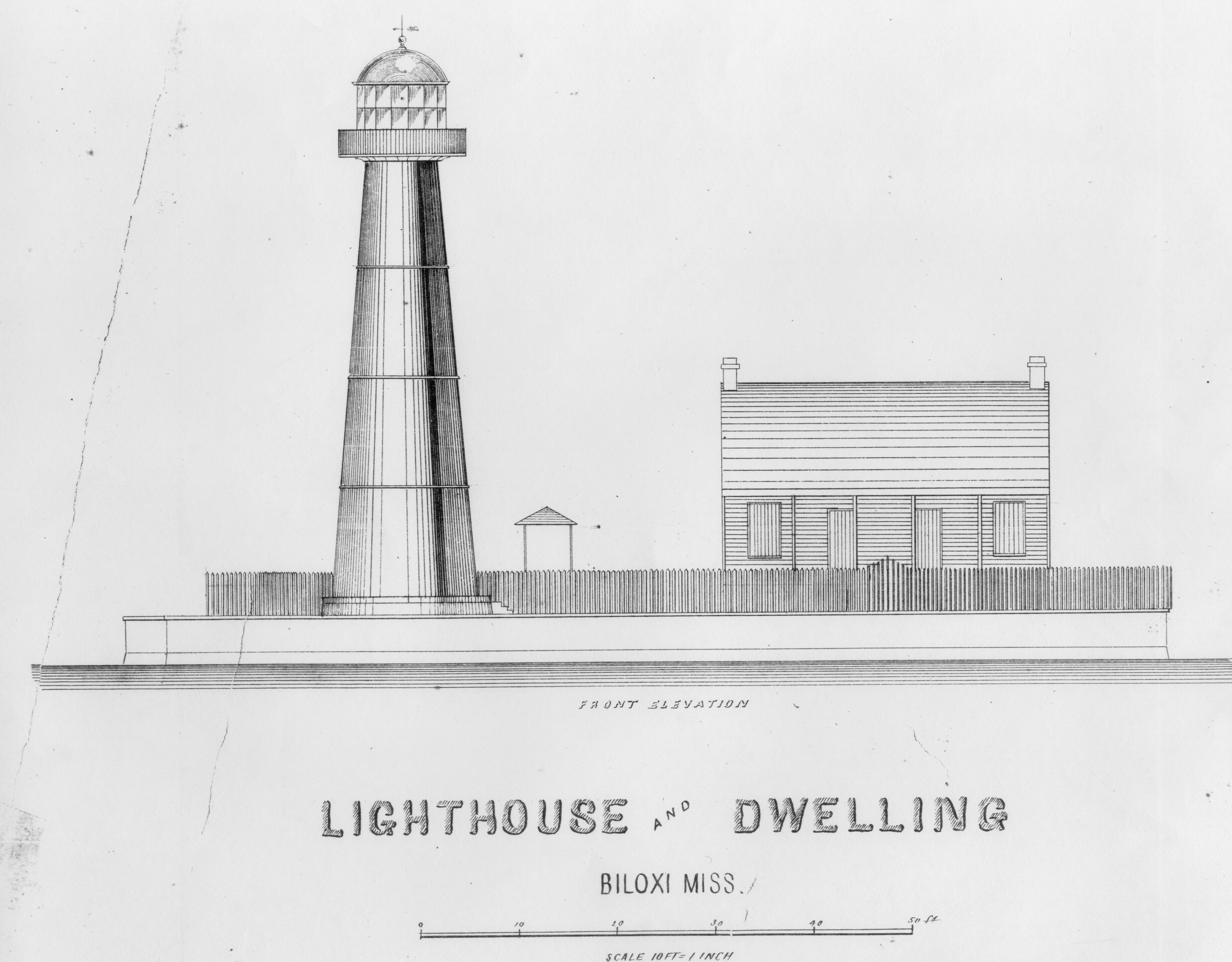
Original architectural drawing

On March 3, 1847, the United States Congress authorized $12,000 for the construction of a lighthouse at Biloxi. The United States Department of the Treasury structured a contract, dated October 15, 1847, to the Baltimore foundry of Murray and Hazlehurst to build an iron lighthouse for $6,347. The keeper's house was contracted separately. The Collector at Mobile, Alabama, purchased the site. The tower was completed and placed in operation in 1848. The tower was 45 feet (14 m) from the base to the lantern room and displayed nine lamps. The first keeper for the lighthouse was Marcellus J. Howard.

== In service ==
Mary Reynolds, with a "large family of orphan children" was appointed keeper on April 11, 1854. She remained in service until the U.S. Civil War. She owed her appointment to Governor Albert Gallatin Brown. In 1856 the light was "refitted."

In 1860 a hurricane swept the coast and destroyed many lighthouses, but the Biloxi Lighthouse remained undamaged. Keeper Reynolds reported that she kept the light burning through the storm and "faithfully performed the duties of Light Keeper in storm and sunshine attending it. "I ascended the Tower during and after the last destructive storm when man stood appalled at the danger I encountered." During a storm in 1860, a portion of the sand under the lighthouse eroded, causing the structure to lean. Later more sand was removed from the opposite side to correct this. Local authorities ordered that the light be extinguished on June 18, 1861. The light was repaired and returned to service by November 15, 1866. At that time the tower was reported to have been painted with coal tar to protect it from rust, not, as has been reported, to mourn the assassination of President Abraham Lincoln.

Perry Younghans was appointed keeper on November 14, 1866, but fell ill soon thereafter. His wife, Maria Younghans, took over and tended the light. When Mr. Younghans died, Mrs. Younghans was appointed keeper December 6, 1867. In 1868 the tower was painted white and almost fell during a hurricane that year. In 1880 the old keeper's house was razed and rebuilt. The seawall was washed away and the tower was threatened during a hurricane on October 1, 1893. The New Orleans Daily Picayune of October 21, 1893, noted that "At Biloxi Mrs. Younghans, the plucky woman who was in charge of the light, kept a light going all through the storm notwithstanding the fact that there were several feet of water in the room where she lived."

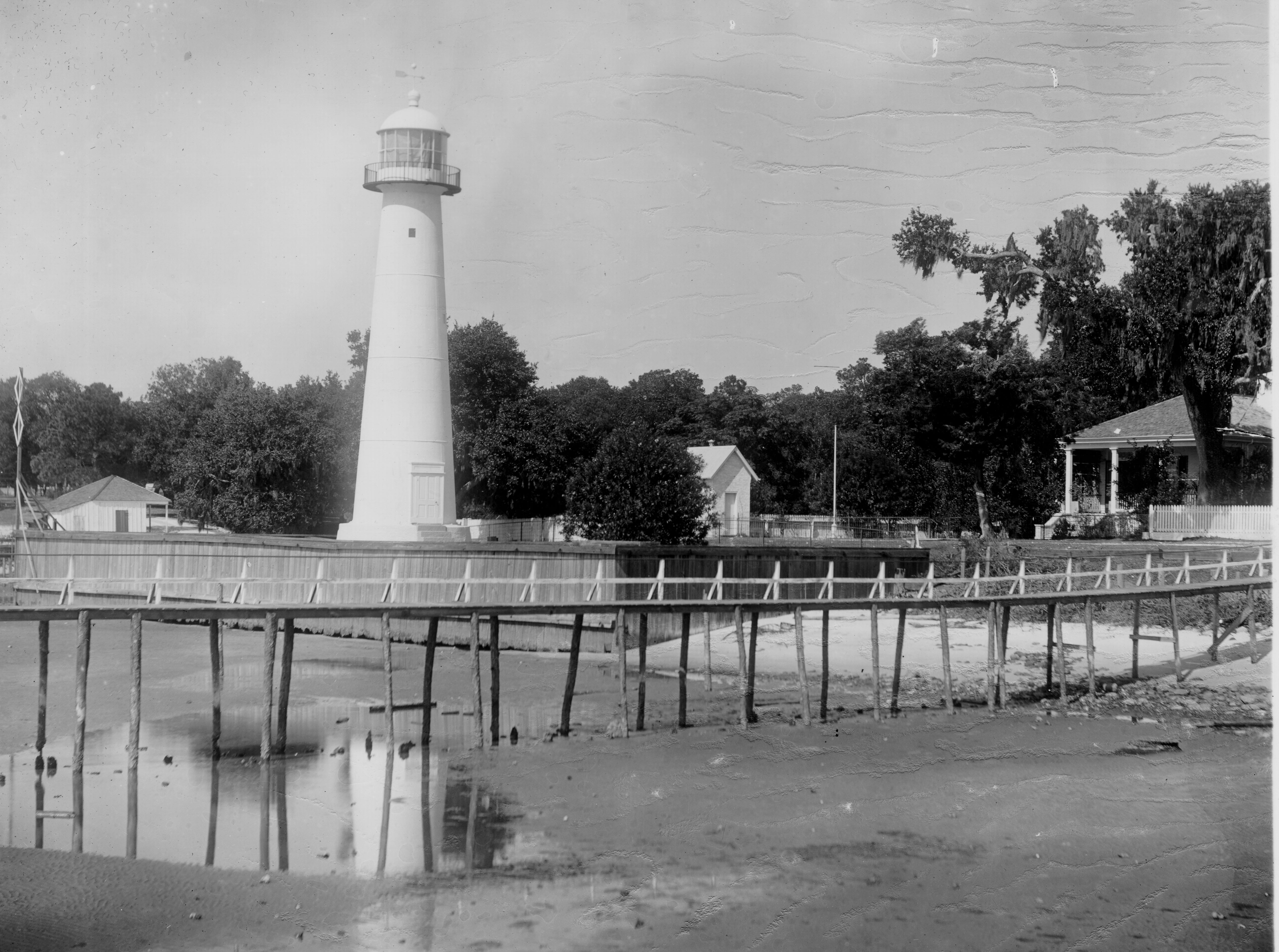
Coast Guard archive photo: October 1892

In 1898, a telephone cable was laid by Reese Hutchinson between the Biloxi and the Ship Island lighthouses at the start of the Spanish–American War.

In 1916, the light was again damaged by a hurricane, and the wharf and boathouse were destroyed by a storm the following year. Maria Younghans retired on December 31, 1918, and was replaced by her daughter, Miranda, who remained as keeper until 1929. The Younghans family had maintained the light for a total of 63 years. W. B. Thompson then took over as keeper.

In 1926, the station was electrified.

In April 1960, the beach near the light was the site of a "wade-in" to protest the segregation of Mississippi's beaches. In 2010, a civil rights historical marker was placed at the light to commemorate the demonstration.

In 1969, the keeper's house was destroyed by Hurricane Camille.

The tower is now owned by the City of Biloxi and is operated as a private aid to navigation.

In 2005, the lighthouse was damaged by Hurricane Katrina. Restoration was completed with a re-lighting ceremony on February 19, 2010. The restoration amounted to over $400,000; repairs included a rewiring, the interior bricks being redone, an installation of exterior lights, and restoration of the surrounding decorative fence.

== In popular culture ==
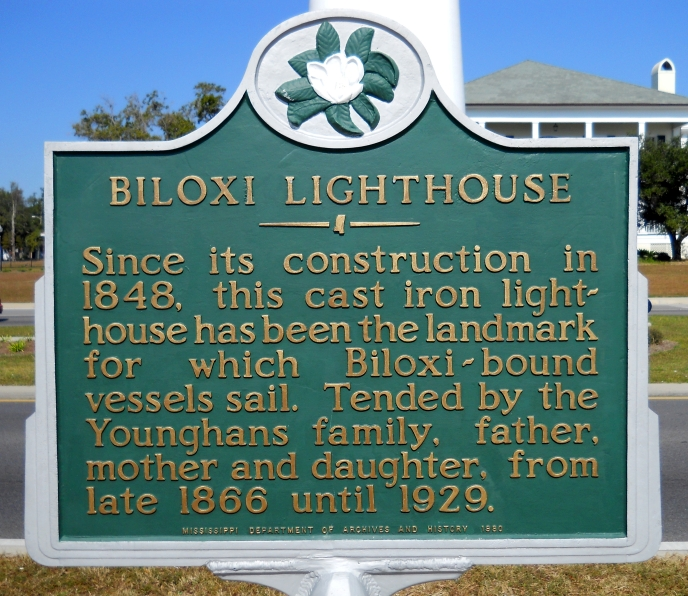
Historical Marker

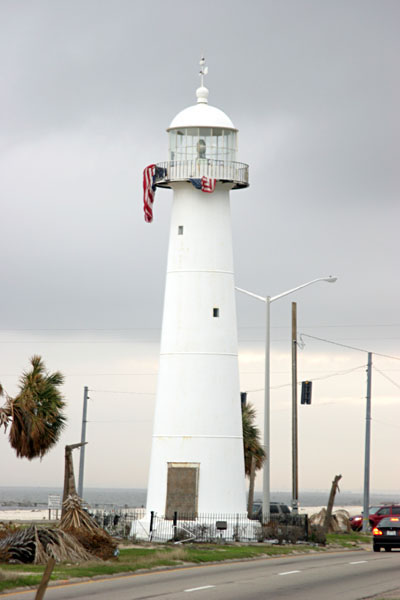
Biloxi Lighthouse in January 2006, five months after Hurricane Katrina

The lighthouse was featured on Mississippi's automobile license plates from October 2007 to October 2012. A press release from the Mississippi State Tax Commission, which designed and issued the plates, acknowledged the Light as "a building of historical importance" that "has long been recognized as a landmark of the Mississippi Gulf Coast".

Throughout its history, the lighthouse has survived a score of hurricanes, including the great storms of 1947 and 1969. On August 29, 2005, it stood against the wind and storm surge of Katrina. Inside the lighthouse, blue lines were painted on the wall to mark historic storm surges above 'mean sea level' (msl). Hurricanes of 1855 and 1906 reached 14.0 feet above msl, a 1909 hurricane crested at 15.0 feet msl, and Hurricane Camille's record of 17.5 feet was broken by Hurricane Katrina, which crested at 21.5 feet msl.

The City of Biloxi has live footage of a view from inside the lighthouse posted to their website. It shows some of the Biloxi coastline and the intersection of Beach Blvd and Porter Ave.
