= Gulf and Ship Island Railroad =

American railroad in Mississippi, 1882–1925

Overview
- Headquarters: Gulfport, Mississippi
- Reporting mark: GSI
- Locale: Mississippi
- Dates of operation: 1882–1925
- Successor: Illinois Central Railroad

Technical
- Track gauge: 4 ft 8 1/2 in (1,435 mm) standard gauge
- Length: 308 miles (496 km)

The Gulf and Ship Island Railroad (G&SI) was constructed in the American state of Mississippi in the late 19th century to open a vast expanse of southern yellow pine to commercial forestry. Initially chartered in 1850, construction was delayed until after the American Civil War. In spite of economic uncertainty, entrepreneurs William H. Hardy and Joseph T. Jones successfully completed construction in 1896, with much of the early phases of the work done by convict labor. The railroad resulted in the development of a new man-made seaport (Gulfport, Mississippi) and the expansion of cities along its route.

== History ==
=== Planning and narrow-gauge line ===
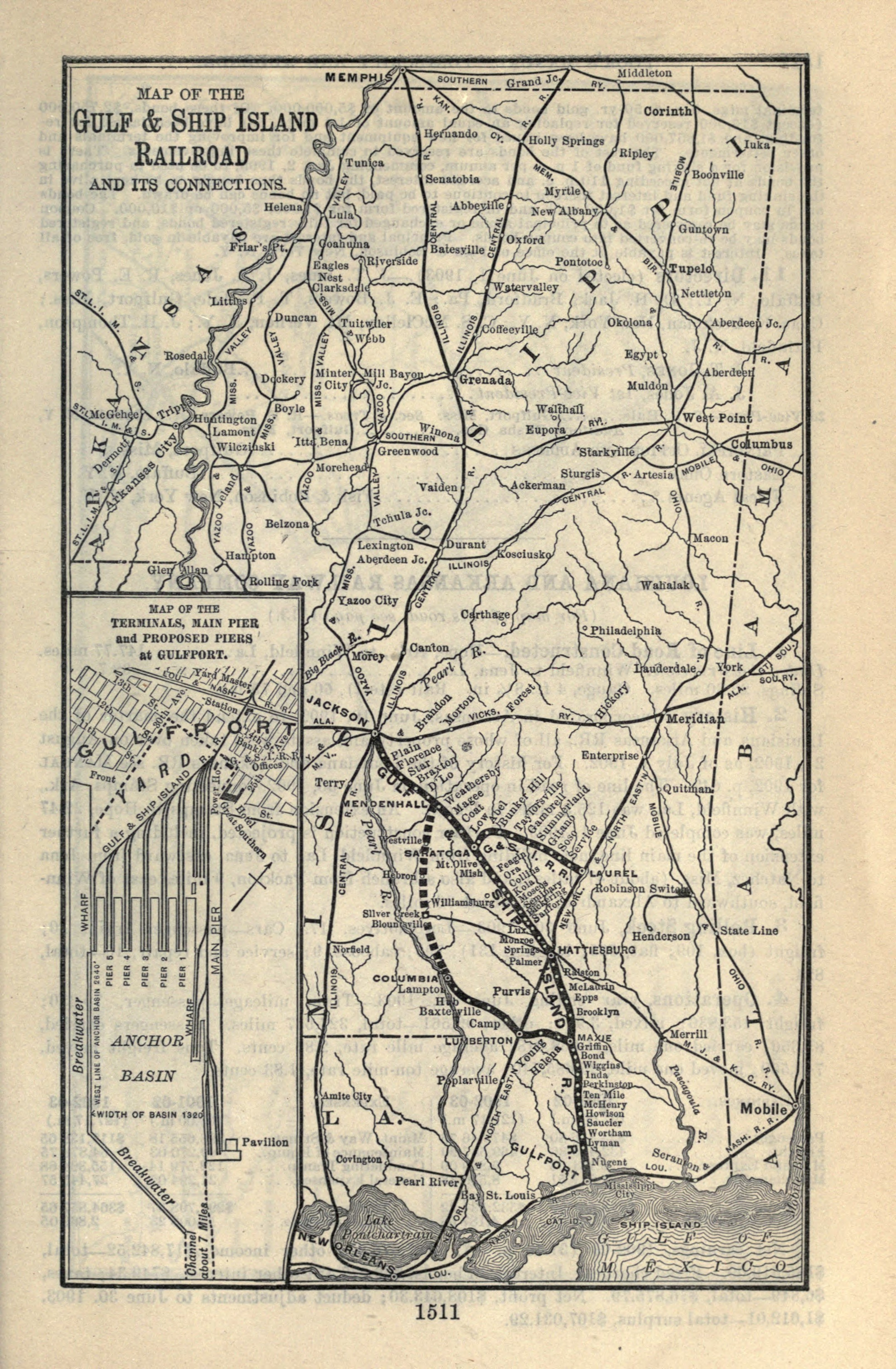
1903 map of the Gulf and Ship Island Railroad

The Gulf and Ship Island Railroad (G&SI) was developed under three charters provided by the Mississippi State Legislature. The first charter was given in 1850, followed by a second in 1856. The second charter expired and lapsed because of the American Civil War and Reconstruction.

In 1871, financier William Clark Falkner (great grandfather of the novelist William Faulkner) chartered the Ripley Railroad to build a narrow gauge line in northeast Mississippi. It opened between Ripley, Mississippi, and Middleton, Tennessee, on August 30, 1872. Falkner aimed to extend the line to the Gulf Coast and the Ohio River; in 1878, he changed the name to the Ship Island, Ripley, and Kentucky Railroad. Falkner and William Wirt Adams rechartered the G&SI in 1882; two years later, they were granted the rights given to the previous iterations of the company.

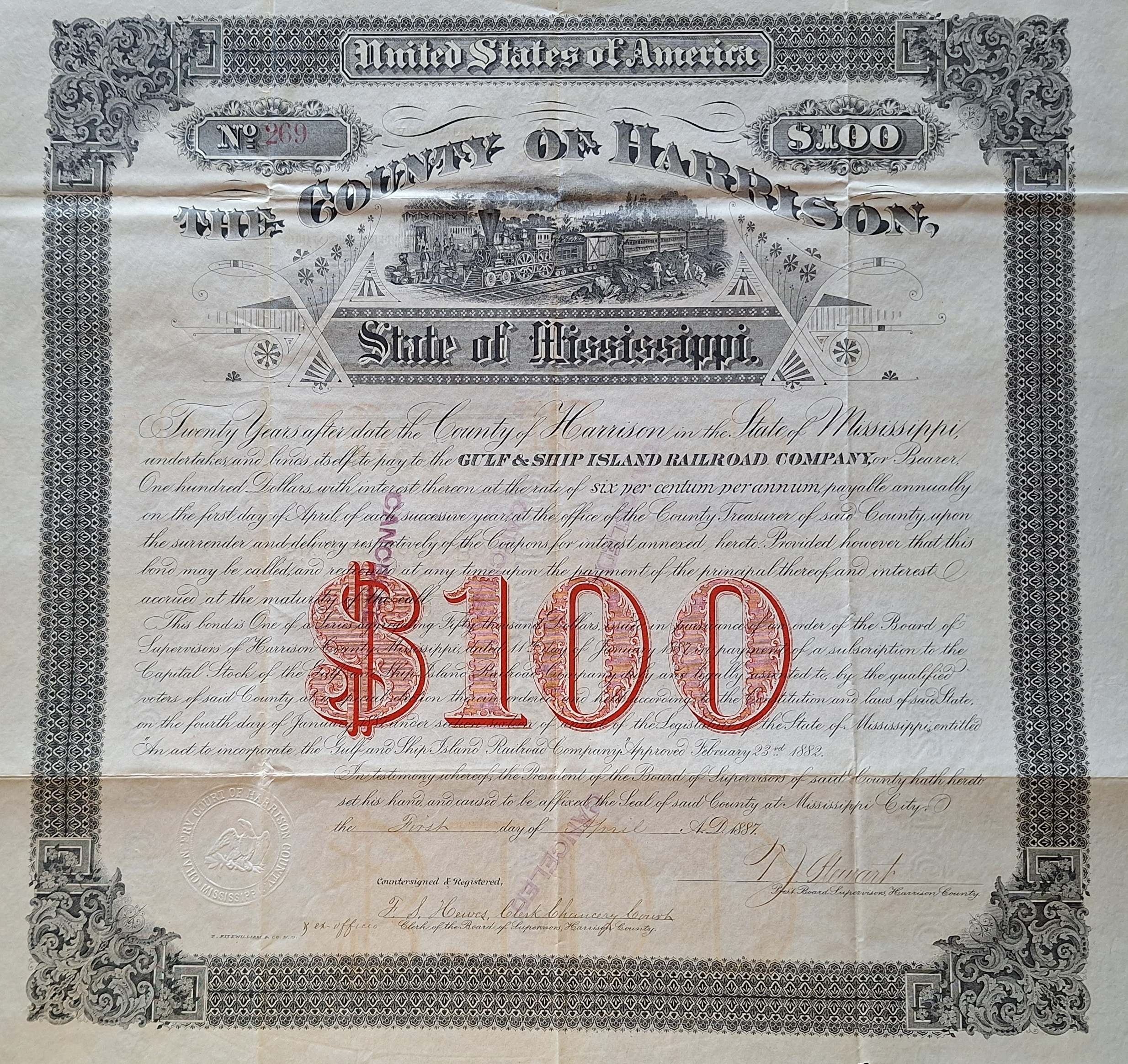
Bond of the County of Harrison, issued 1 April 1887 for supporting the Gulf and Ship Island Railroad Company.

The company stopped operation in 1885 due to lack of money. After an 1886 reorganization, the presidency was offered to William H. Hardy. In 1887, Hardy agreed to construct the line from his New Orleans and Northeastern Railroad at Hattiesburg (named in honor of his wife Hattie Lott Hardy) to the Gulf. He chose the natural deep-water harbor protected by Ship Island and proposed a new city, Gulfport, as the railroad terminal.

The company completed about 20 miles (32 km) of narrow gauge line between Ripley and Pontotoc, Mississippi, in June 1887 and leased it to the Ship Island, Ripley, and Kentucky. Adams was killed in 1888; after his death, Falkner purchased the Ripley–Pontotac line on August 1, 1889, with the intention of merging it with the Ship Island, Ripley, and Kentucky. However, Falkner was murdered later that year. His heirs formed the Gulf and Chicago Railroad on February 20, 1890, to operate the narrow gauge lines.

=== Construction ===
Construction on the standard gauge section of the G&SI began in 1877 using convict labor. However, the convict lease was terminated in 1888 due to abuse of the prison workers. The initial phases of construction then continued under the supervision of The Union Investment Company, which fell into bankruptcy, and the Tobey Construction Company. But the railroad remained unfinished. Hardy worked diligently to seek out investors and financiers in the northern and western U.S., as well as in Europe, to bring new capital to the project, but Reconstruction Era economics compromised his efforts. Hardy's attempts to secure financing could not stop a widespread panic, causing the G&SI to fall into receivership in 1896.

By the late 1800s, Joseph T. Jones had made a fortune in oil wells and oil pipelines in Pennsylvania and West Virginia. He heard of the potential for investment in the bankrupt railroad being constructed in Mississippi that included 63,000 acres (25,000 hectares) of timberland, as well as another 400,000 acres (160,000 hectares) of timberland available for harvest.

Jones, along with other investors, formed the Bradford Construction Company to buy the bankrupt railroad and pursue the investment opportunity in Mississippi. The longest section of the G&SI was completed by the Bradford Construction Company of Pennsylvania, under the leadership and financing of J.T. Jones. In 1901, Jones bought out his partners, and the Bradford Construction Company merged with the Gulf and Ship Island Railroad Company. In need of a residence on the Gulf Coast, Jones had the Great Southern Hotel constructed at Gulfport. Nearby, a new office building was constructed for the Gulf and Ship Island Railroad Company.

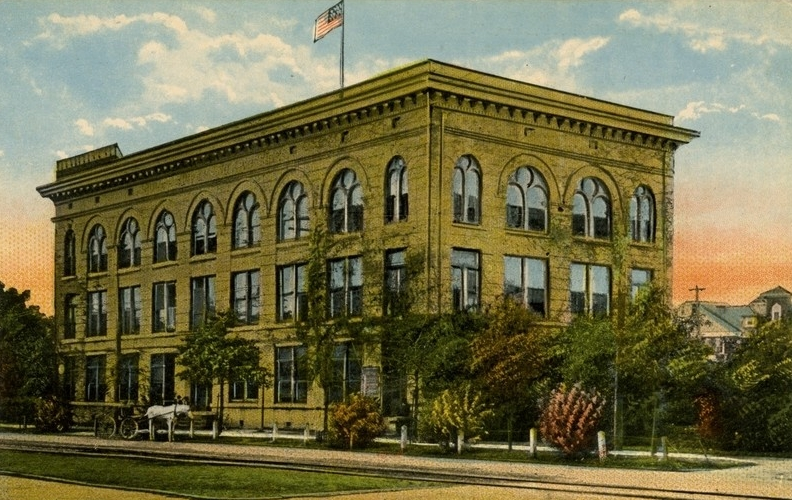
c. 1910

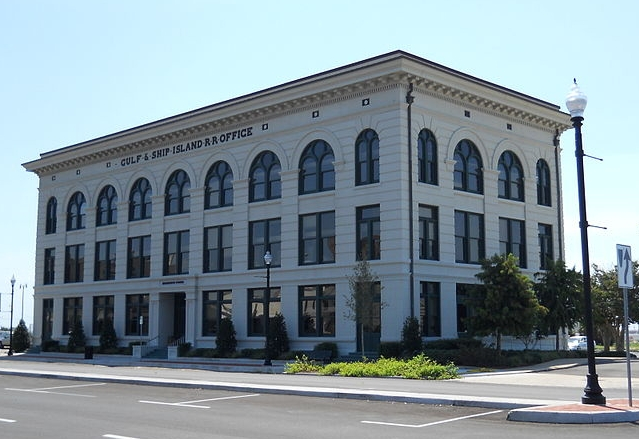
2010

Gulf & Ship Island Railroad office building, Gulfport, Mississippi

Although the G&SIRR Company changed hands to Joseph T. Jones, W.H. Hardy remained involved as a board member until 1899. In 1895, Hardy was elected to the Mississippi State Legislature which kept him at the State Capital in Jackson, precluding his involvement with the railroad.

On October 3, 1896, the railroad was completed between Gulfport and Hattiesburg. In mid-1899, work began on an extension northwards to Jackson plus a branch from Saratoga to Laurel. The eastern portion of the Laurel branch was in use by that October. Passenger service on the main line was extended north to Saratoga in April 1900. The Jackson extension opened on July 5, 1900, with passenger service added on August 1. The Laurel branch was completed to Saratoga on August 31, 1900. A branch from Maxie to Columbia opened later in 1900. It was extended in April 1906 to rejoin the main line at Mendenhall.

=== Use of convict labor ===
In 1886, the state legislature passed a law transferring all of the convicts held in the Mississippi State Penitentiary to the Gulf and Ship Island Railroad as part of a convict leasing system. Under this practice, common in the post-civil war south, prisoners could be used as a workforce by private companies, who paid a minimal fee to the state in exchange for their labor. This system was lucrative for both the state and the companies, and the passage of racially-discriminatory Black Codes after 1876 led to a quadrupling of the state's convict population (85% of whom were Black) within 2 years.

While working on the Gulf and Ship Island Railroad at least 200 convicts disappeared, both due to escapes and deaths from overwork or mistreatment. In December 1888 the railroad's convict lease was cancelled due to abuse of the prisoners, which included flogging and illegal subleasing of convicts to other businesses. At least 60 convict workers died while working for the Gulf and Ship Island Railroad in 1888, and the Mississippi state government ended the practice of leasing convicts to build railroads in 1890.

The harsh working conditions endured by Black convict laborers on the Gulf and Ship Island Railroad were memorialized in Blues music, with John Lomax recording a song called “The Gulf is a Long Railroad,” performed by Mississippi prison inmates in 1933, and blues musician Robert Johnson recording "Long Fair Deal Gone Down" about the same railroad in 1936.

=== Operation ===
The Gulf and Ship Island Railroad operated exclusively in the State of Mississippi. The company eventually owned approximately 160 miles (260 km) of standard gauge main rail line, 147 miles (237 km) of branch lines and 106 miles (171 km) of track in Gulfport. The G&SIRR opened a vast resource of southern yellow pines for harvest. Logging and lumber companies sprang up in towns along the rail line and used the railroad to transport logs to sawmills and lumber to markets. By 1902, the 74 miles (119 km) of the line between Gulfport and Hattiesburg averaged one sawmill and one turpentine distillery every 3 miles (4.8 km). In 1907 alone, about 800 million board feet of southern yellow pine lumber was transported on the G&SIRR.

The G&SIRR Company controlled a 6-mile (9.7-km) long channel in the Gulf of Mexico that connected the mainland to Ship Island. Dredging of a shipping channel was completed by the S.S. Bullis Company in 1902; it connected Ship Island and the main railroad terminal at Gulfport. The G&SIRR greatly facilitated the development of the shipping port. Between 1903 and 1907, more than a billion board feet of timber was shipped out of Gulfport. In 1908, the first shipment of cotton was exported by steamship. During the early years after port development, some of the items imported through Gulfport included phosphates, iron pyrite, creosote oil, naval stores and mahogany. From 1910 through 1913, the Port of Gulfport shipped and exported more timber than any other port in the world.

On July 1, 1903, the Gulf and Chicago was leased to the Mobile, Jackson and Kansas City Railroad. It was converted to standard gauge south of New Albany, Mississippi, on June 20, 1904, and north on June 27, 1905. Through mergers, it formed part of the mainline of the Gulf, Mobile and Northern Railroad, which merged into the Gulf, Mobile and Ohio Railroad (GM&O) in 1940.

=== Illinois Central ===
In December 1924, the Illinois Central Railroad (IC) and the G&SIRR began operating through sleepers between Gulfport, Chicago, and Memphis. The Chicago–Gulfport sleeper was carried by the Panama Limited between Chicago and Gulfport. The IC acquired the G&SIRR in 1925.

The IC discontinued Jackson–Gulfport passenger service in November 1950, defying an order the month before from the Mississippi Public Service Commission. The IC obtained an injunction against the order. The injunction was dissolved in 1954; the commission renewed its order, but the railroad obtained another injunction in August 1954. A federal court ruled in favor of the railroad in 1956. The municipalities along the line declined to fund an appeal to the Supreme Court.

== See also ==
- Wiggins Depot (Mississippi): a G&SI station
- Finkbine-Guild Lumber Company
