= Turkey Creek Community Historic District =

Historic district in Mississippi, United States

- U.S. National Register of Historic Places
- U.S. Historic district
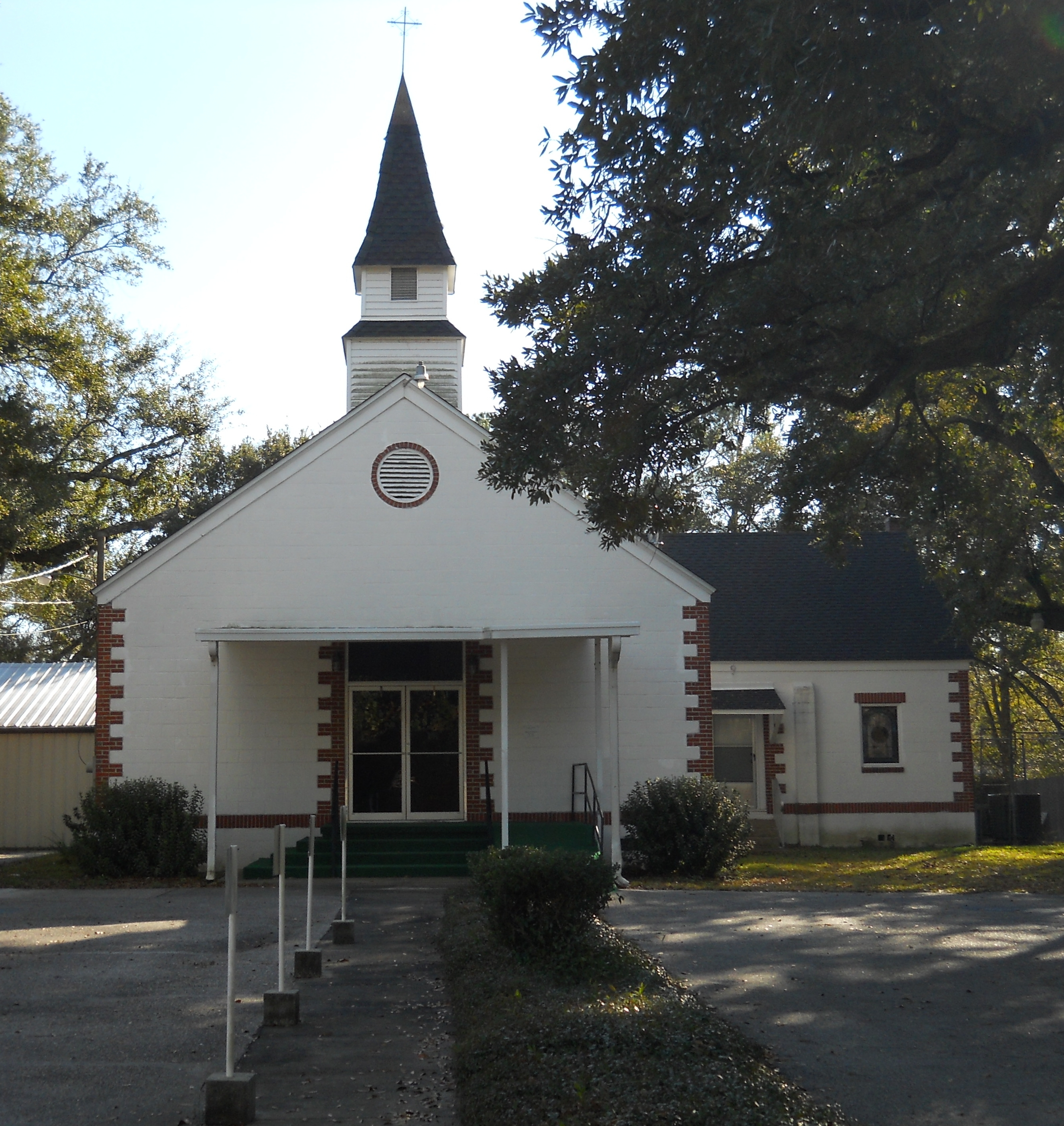
- Mount Pleasant United Methodist Church in the Turkey Creek Community Historic District

- Location within Mississippi Location within the United States
- Location: Rippy Road environs Gulfport, Mississippi
- Coordinates: 30°25′24.92″N 89°04′36.90″W
- Area: 110 acres (45 hectares)
- Built: dating from circa 1870
- Architectural style: Bungalow, Craftsman, Shotgun, Ranch
- NRHP reference No.: 07000173
- Added to NRHP: March 21, 2007

Turkey Creek Community Historic District is a settlement established by emancipated African Americans during the Reconstruction Era after the American Civil War. The community is situated in north Gulfport, Mississippi, and was added to the National Register of Historic Places in 2007.

== History ==
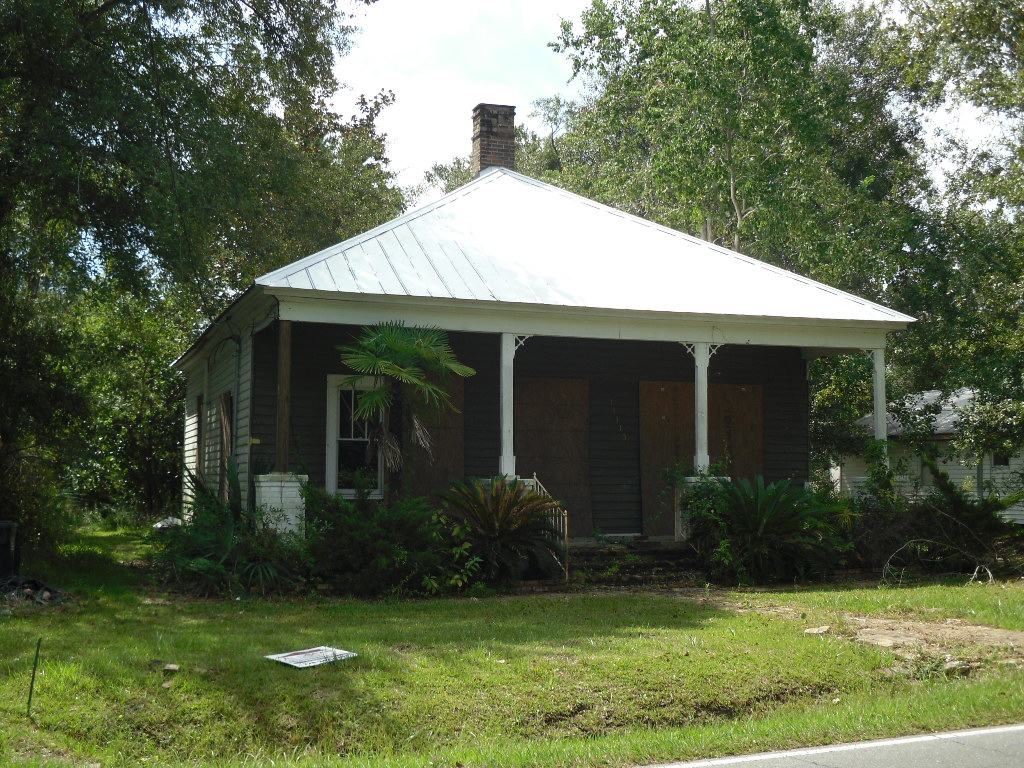
Thomas and Melinda Benton House in 2012

In 1866, a group of emancipated African Americans settled along Turkey Creek on about 320 acres (130 hectares) formerly owned by Arkansas Lumber Company. Freed slaves, Thomas and Melinda Benton, acquired enough land so that their holdings comprised 50 percent of the community. Later settlers purchased property from the Bentons. Many residential lots originally adjoined Turkey Creek, which served as a transportation route for early settlers. Residents often planted gardens, grew fruit trees, and raised livestock on their property.

== Description ==
The historic Turkey Creek community is surrounded by large urban developments that include the Gulfport-Biloxi International Airport to the south, U.S. Route 49 to the west, and an industrial seaway on the north. The Historic District is a residential area situated along Rippy Road and is associated with freshwater marsh and coastal hardwood forest. The principal forest cover type is live oak (Quercus virginiana) with common associates that include Myrica cerifera, Ilex vomitoria, Vaccinium arboreum, and Serenoa repens. Houses consist of one-story cottages typical of vernacular architecture. In addition to residential houses, the community contains religious and educational structures. The primary natural feature is Turkey Creek which meanders along 12.9 miles (20.8 kilometers) to Bayou Bernard.

By the mid-1950s, infrastructure development in the form of industries, highways, airports and housing construction, associated with the expansion of Gulfport, began to encroach on the Turkey Creek Community. Although the Turkey Creek Community predated the founding of the City of Gulfport, it was annexed by that City in 1994. After Hurricane Katrina devastated the Mississippi Gulf Coast in 2005, business expansion accelerated northward, away from the coastline, and into the Turkey Creek Community, garnering national attention. In response, the Turkey Creek Community Initiatives was formed and received assistance from the Land Trust for the Mississippi Coastal Plain and Audubon Mississippi to protect the remaining natural and cultural resources of the Turkey Creek Watershed from further degradation caused by commercial encroachment. In 2021, Turkey Creek (the river that runs adjacent to the community) was listed by American Rivers as one of America's 10 Most Endangered Rivers due to the continuing threat of development.
