= Mississippi Aquarium =

Public aquarium in Gulfport, Mississippi, United States

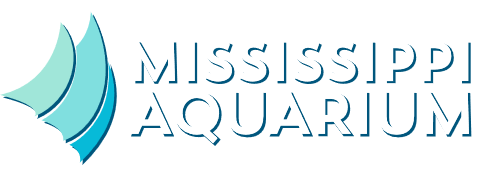

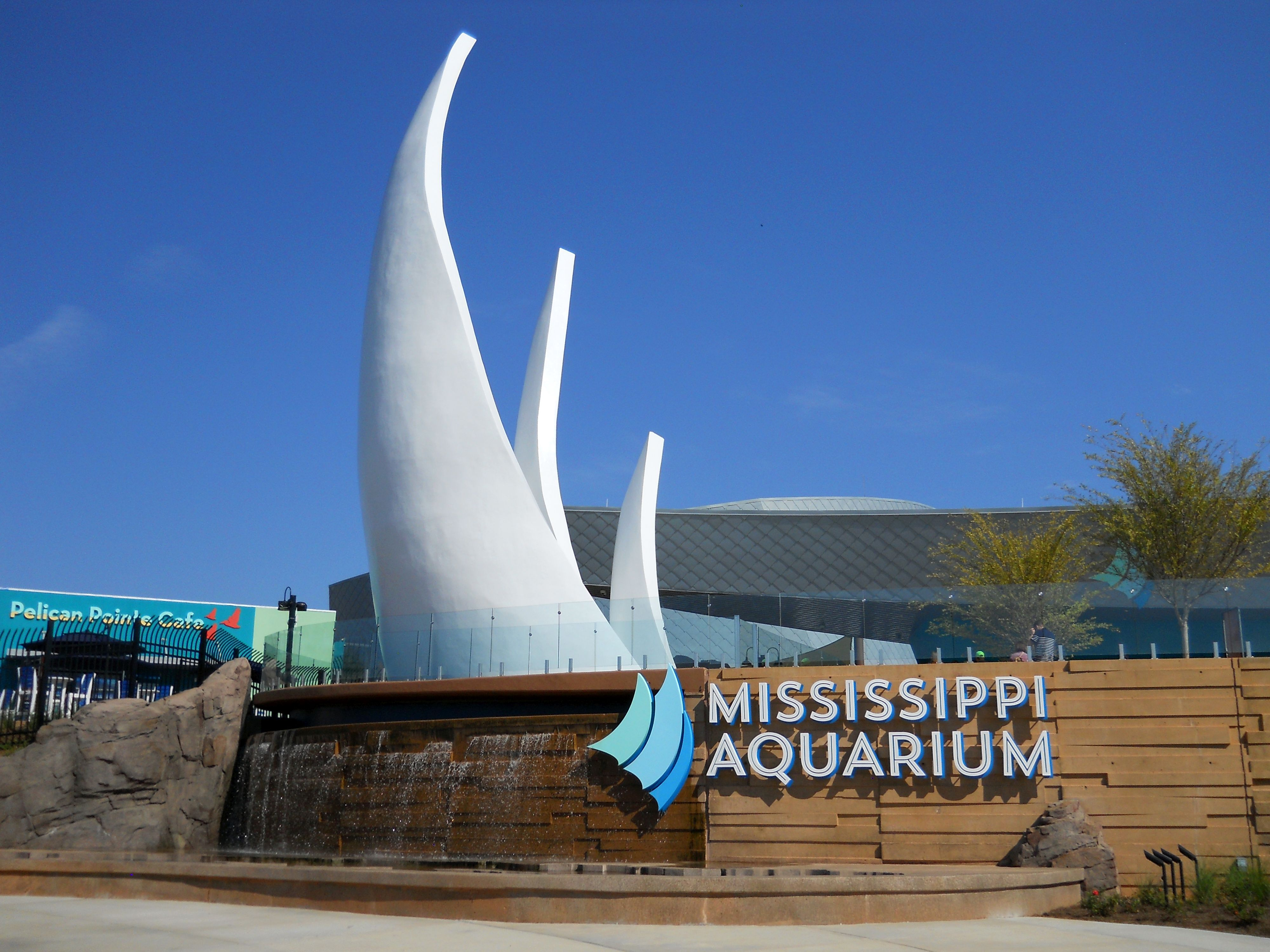
- Interactive map of Mississippi Aquarium
- 30°22′4″N 89°5′18″W
- Date opened: August 29, 2020
- Location: 2100 E. Beach Boulevard, Gulfport, Mississippi, United States of America
- Land area: 5.8 acres (2.3 ha)
- Floor space: 80,000 sq ft (7,400 m^{2})
- No. of species: >200 species of fish and other animals plus 50 species of native plants
- Total volume of tanks: over 1 million US gallons (3,800 m^{3}) of saltwater and freshwater
- Major exhibits: 12
- Website: www.msaquarium.org

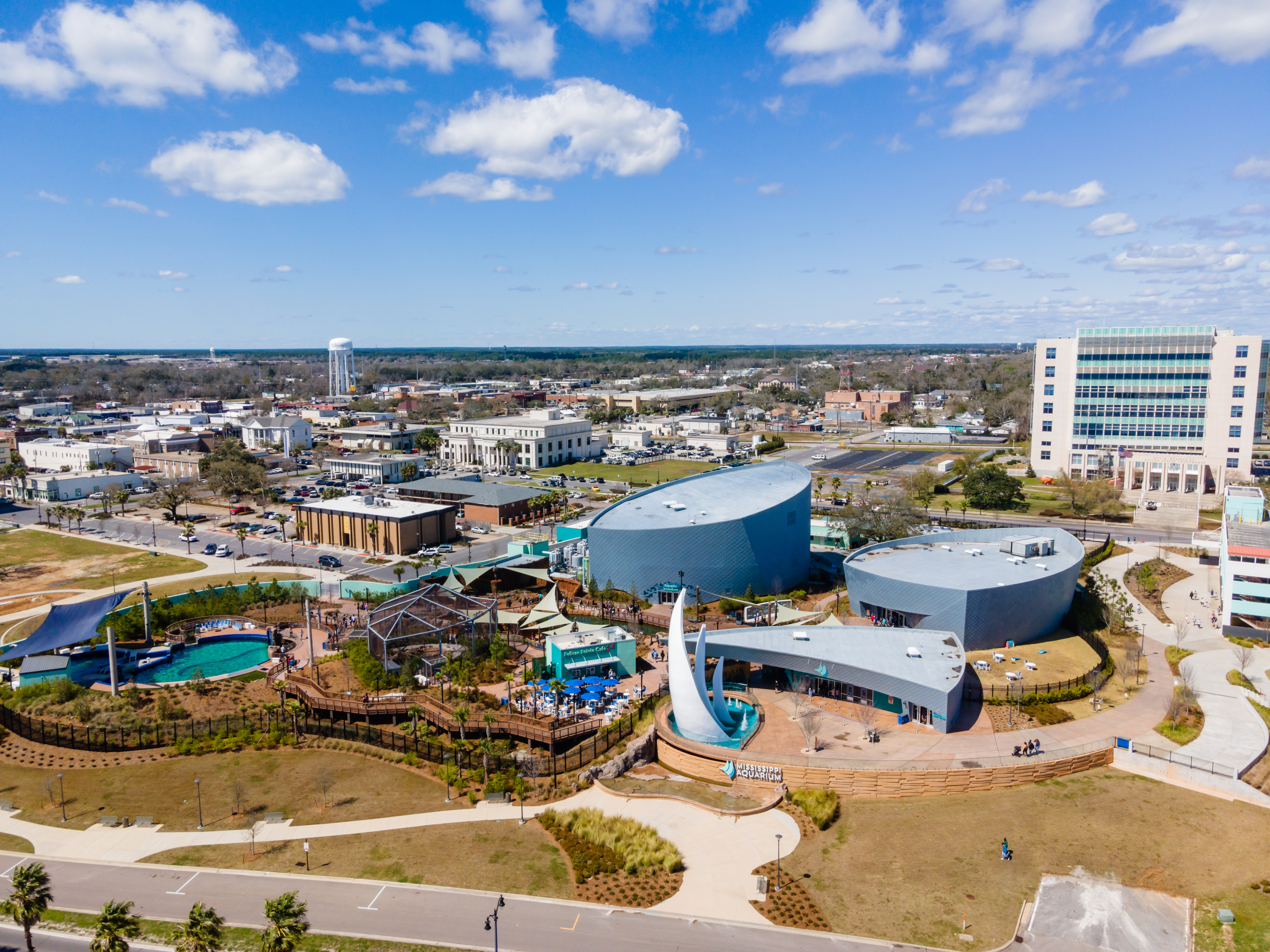
An aerial view of the Mississippi Aquarium in 2022

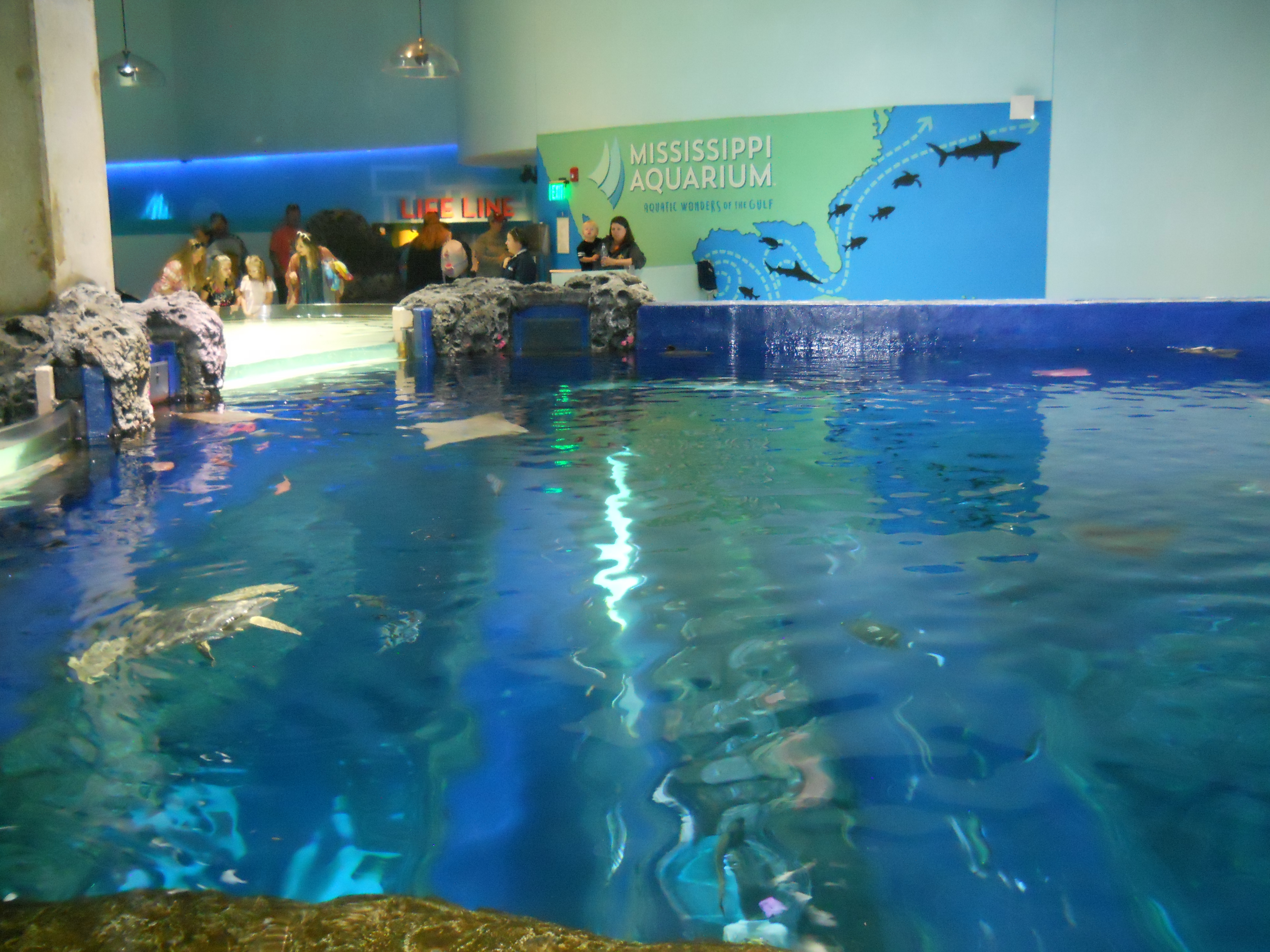
One of the indoor exhibits

Mississippi Aquarium is a nonprofit public aquarium located in Gulfport, Mississippi; it opened August 29, 2020, on the 15th anniversary of Hurricane Katrina, replacing the Marine Life Oceanarium, which was destroyed by the hurricane. The 5.8-acre (2.3 ha) complex incorporates both indoor and outdoor habitats with more than 200 species of animals and 50 species of native plants. Construction costs were paid through federal, state, local, and private consortiums.

== Construction ==
Groundbreaking ceremonies for the aquarium were held on May 11, 2018. The lead designer of the aquarium was Eley Guild Hardy Architects of Biloxi, with assistance from PGAV Destinations of St. Louis, and Brown, Mitchell & Alexander, Inc. (consulting engineers) of Gulfport/Biloxi.

Funding for the US$93 million construction project – land acquisition, facility design, and construction – was achieved through public and private collaboration. Up to 90% of financial backing came from the City of Gulfport, the State of Mississippi, RESTORE Act grants, and funds from the Gulf of Mexico Energy Act. Private donations through the Mississippi Aquarium Foundation accounted for the remaining 10% of funding.

== Features and exhibits ==
Distinct features at the aquarium entrance and emblazoned on its logo are three sails.

Current and proposed exhibits include:

- Habitat of Alligator
- Habitat of river fish
- Habitat of North American river otter
- Habitat of bottlenose dolphin
- Aviary
- 360-degree acrylic underwater tunnel
- Bait ball habitat
- Habitat of bottom dwellers
- Visitor interaction with invertebrates
- Visitor interaction with sharks and rays
- Habitat of the Gulf Community
- Habitat of beaver
- Habitat of African penguin

The aquarium complex contains landscaped footpaths that are lined with native plants from seven physiographic regions of Mississippi.

== See also ==
- List of aquaria in the United States
