= Gulfport Veterans Administration Medical Center Historic District =

Historic district in Mississippi, United States

- U.S. National Register of Historic Places
- Mississippi Landmark
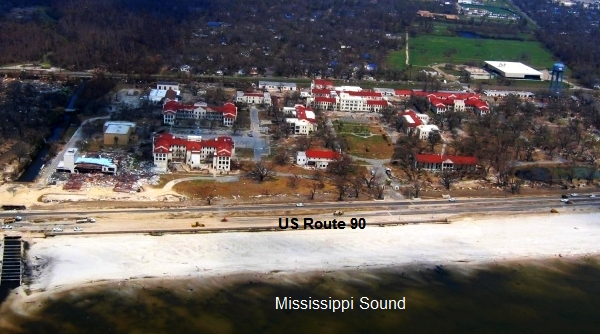
- Gulfport Veterans Administration; Medical Center Historic District in 2005

- Location within Mississippi Location within the United States
- Location: 200 Beach Blvd, Gulfport, Mississippi
- Coordinates: 30°22′41″N 89°03′08″W
- Area: 48 acres (19 ha)
- Built: 1920 to 1950
- Architectural style: Spanish Colonial Revival
- NRHP reference No.: 13001080
- USMS No.: 047-GLF-2400-NR-ML

Significant dates
- Added to NRHP: January 15, 2014
- Designated USMS: July 23, 2010

Gulfport Veterans Administration Medical Center Historic District, also known as Centennial Plaza, is a 48-acre (19 ha) compound located in Gulfport, Mississippi. The facility operated as a medical center under the Veterans Administration from the 1920s until 2005, when damage from Hurricane Katrina resulted in its closure. The property was designated a Mississippi Landmark in 2010 and was added to the National Register of Historic Places in 2014.

== History ==
Development of the property began in 1916, when it was selected as the site for Mississippi's centennial statehood celebration. The centennial exposition was set to open in the autumn of 1917, but with the advent of World War I, the event was never held.

In support of the war, Mississippi leased the property, including the temporary centennial exhibition buildings, to the U.S. Navy for use as a training facility. When the war ended, the U.S. Public Health Service took over the lease, and in 1921, opened a hospital for neuropsychiatric care of military servicemen. In 1922, the hospital was transferred to the U.S. Veterans' Bureau. That same year, the Bureau purchased the property from the State of Mississippi and began construction of several buildings that were completed in 1923. As time passed, medical services increased and additional buildings were constructed to accommodate more veterans.

The medical center continued to operate into the 21st century, but closed after Hurricane Katrina's storm surge caused the collapse of one structure and flooding of the other buildings to a depth of 4 feet (1.2 m). Following storm cleanup, the Veterans Administration transferred the property to the City of Gulfport in 2009.

== Contributing resources ==
The historic district contains twelve contributing resources, ten of which are historic buildings that were constructed between 1920 and 1950 in Spanish Colonial Revival architectural style. The historic buildings were constructed using poured concrete, terra cotta brick with stucco finishes, and terra cotta tile roofs. In the post-hurricane cleanup, the interiors of all ten buildings were gutted in preparation for future renovation.

The two contributing resources that are not buildings include the main entry gates and the site landscape which incorporated southern live oaks around the perimeter of each building. The ten historic buildings are as follows:

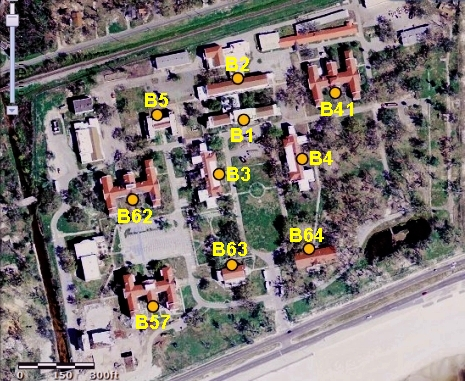
Location of historic buildings within the Medical Center campus

Description	Building No.	Year constructed
Main medical building	B1	1923
Kitchen & dining hall	B2	1923
Ward B	B3	1923
Ward C	B4	1923
Ward D	B5	1923
Infirmary	B41	1937
Hospital building	B57	1946
Ward G	B62	1931
Chapel	B63	1931
Administration building	B64	1931

== Development ==
Development of the property as a community oriented marketplace, utilized existing buildings to create retail outlets, restaurants, and hotels.

=== Mississippi bicentennial celebration ===
The bicentennial celebration for south Mississippi was held at Centennial Plaza on March 31 and April 1, 2017. During the event, the U. S. Postal Service introduced a first-day-of-issue forever stamp to commemorate the 200th anniversary of Mississippi statehood. Approximately 25,000 people attended the two-day celebration.

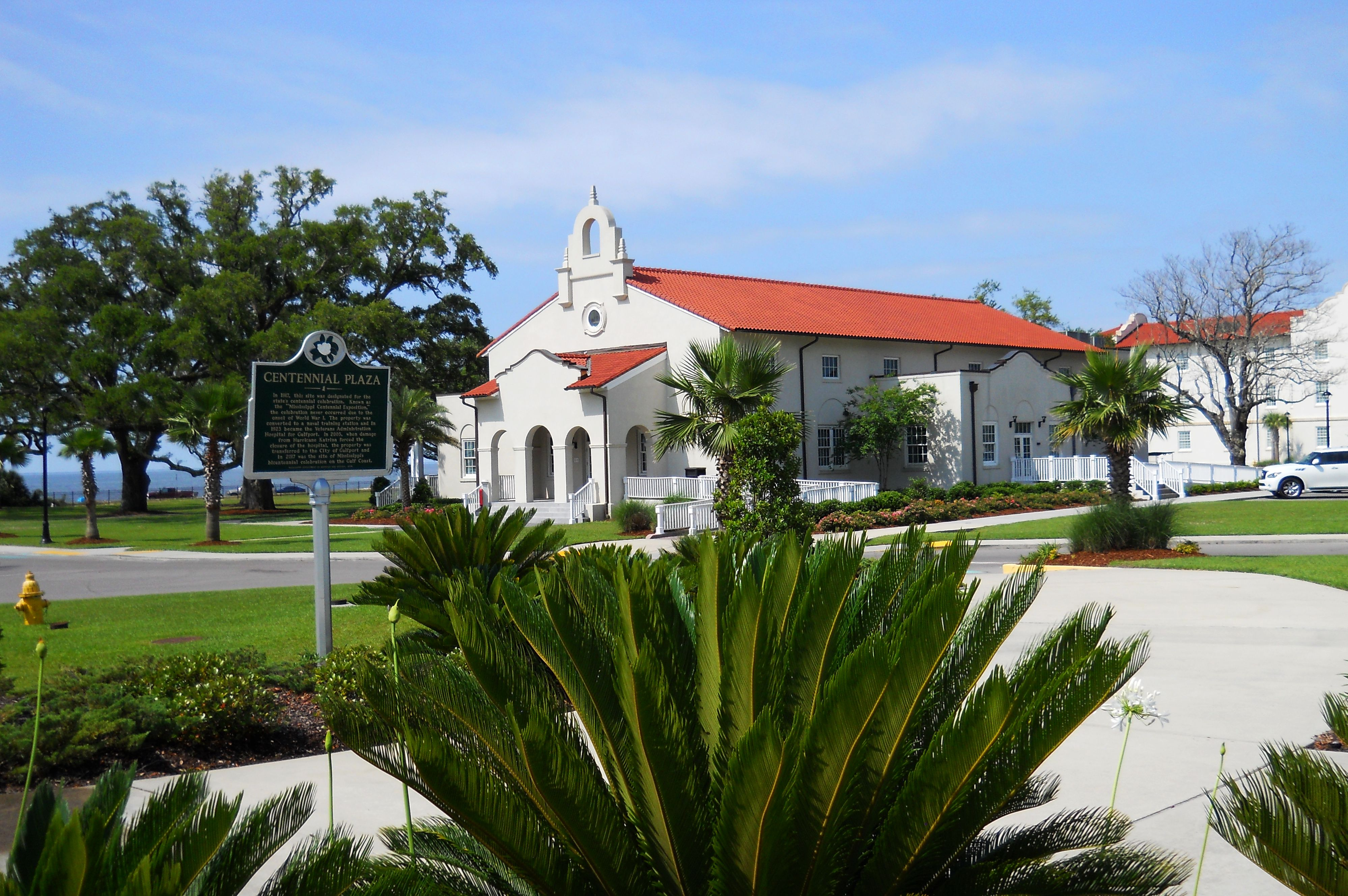
Chapel Event Center, Centennial Plaza

=== Resort development ===
In August 2019, Centennial Plaza Resort opened to the public. The US$100 million development included renovation of 10 historical buildings within the 48-acre (19 ha) complex. When the new resort opened, it had two hotels containing over 200 rooms, two full-service restaurants, a 3-acre (1.2 ha) water park (splash pads, slides, pool), and a wedding chapel so as to accommodate both business and family clientele.
