= United States Post Office and Customhouse (Gulfport, Mississippi) =

- US Post Office and Customhouse
- U.S. National Register of Historic Places
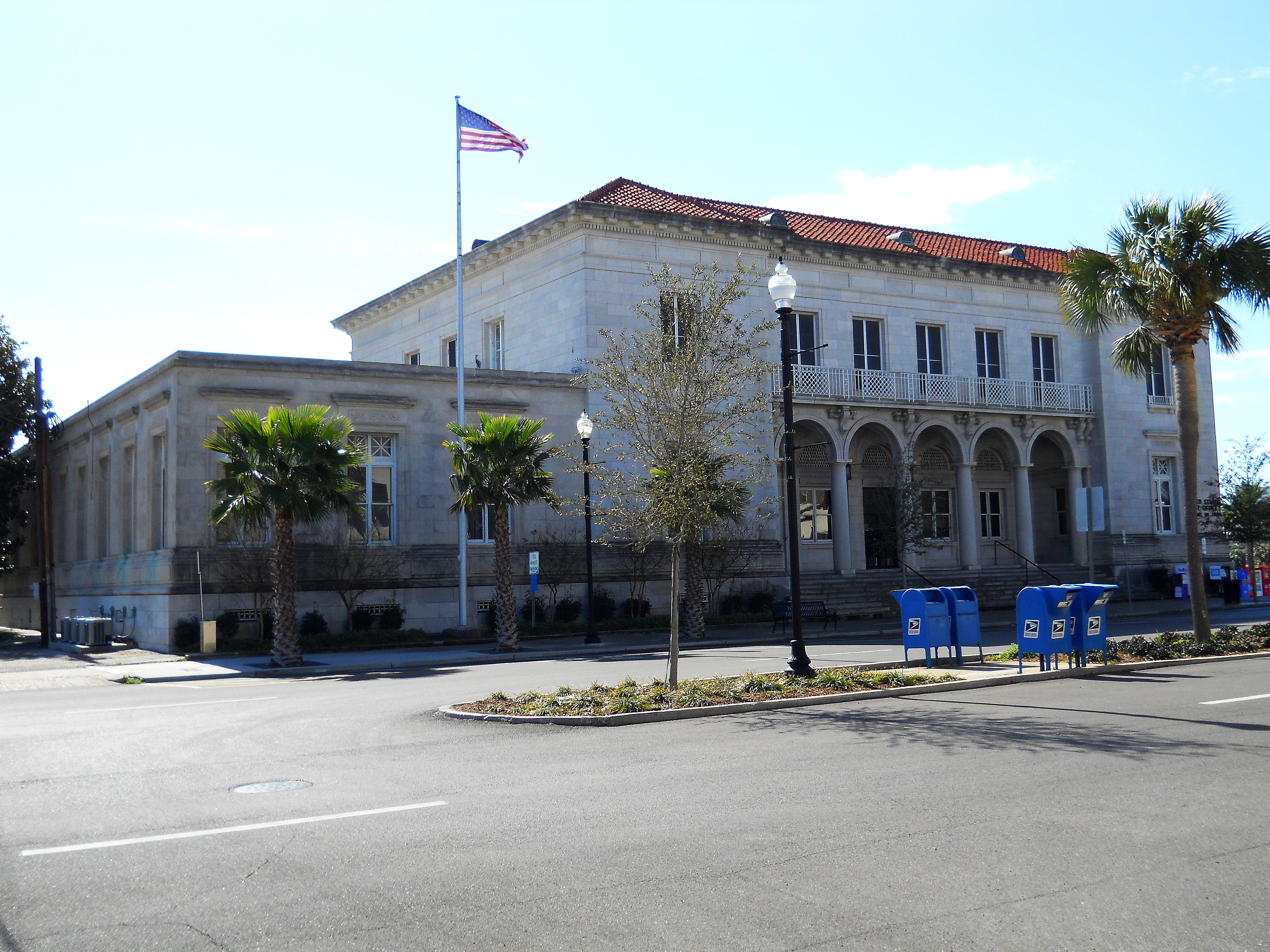
- January 2012

- Location within Mississippi Location within the United States
- Location: 2421 13th St., Gulfport, Mississippi
- Coordinates: 30°22′0″N 89°5′33″W
- Area: 1 acre (0.40 ha)
- Built: 1910, 1963
- Built by: George E. Moore & Sons
- Architect: James Knox Taylor
- Architectural style: Late 19th and 20th Century Revivals, Second Renaissance Revival
- NRHP reference No.: 84002209
- Added to NRHP: March 19, 1984

The U.S. Post Office and Customhouse in Gulfport, Mississippi is a historic post office and customhouse that was completed in 1910 under supervision of the U.S. Treasury Department, with James Knox Taylor as Supervising Architect. One of the oldest public or commercial structures in the city, it also has been known as Downtown Station and as Old Main Post Office. In 1963 a one-story extension to the rear was added.

It was listed on the National Register of Historic Places in 1984.

Its NRHP nomination asserted "It is a beautifully proportioned building with elegant and tasteful embellishments and is significant as one of the finest examples of Second Renaissance Revival architecture in Mississippi."
