= Gulfport, Mississippi =

- City
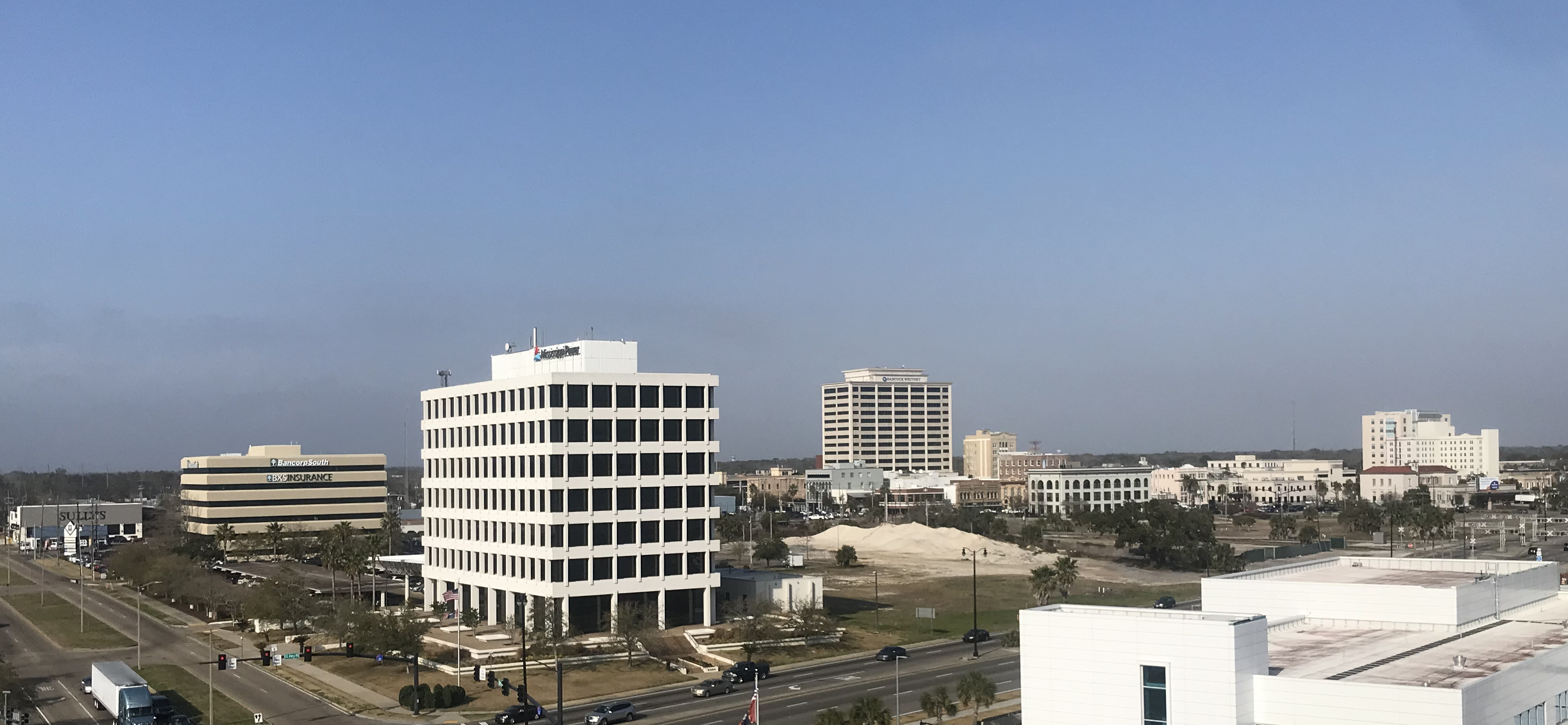
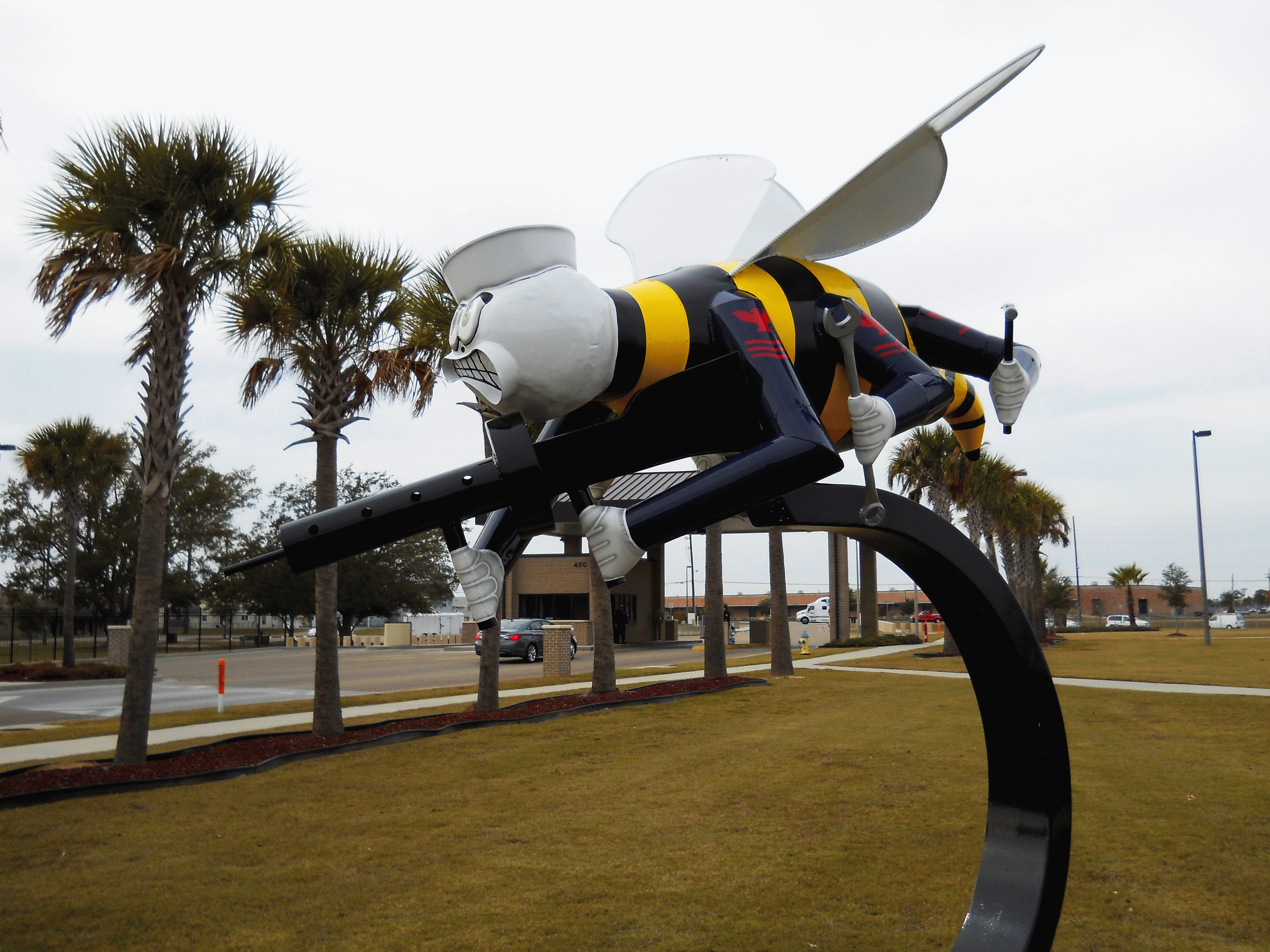
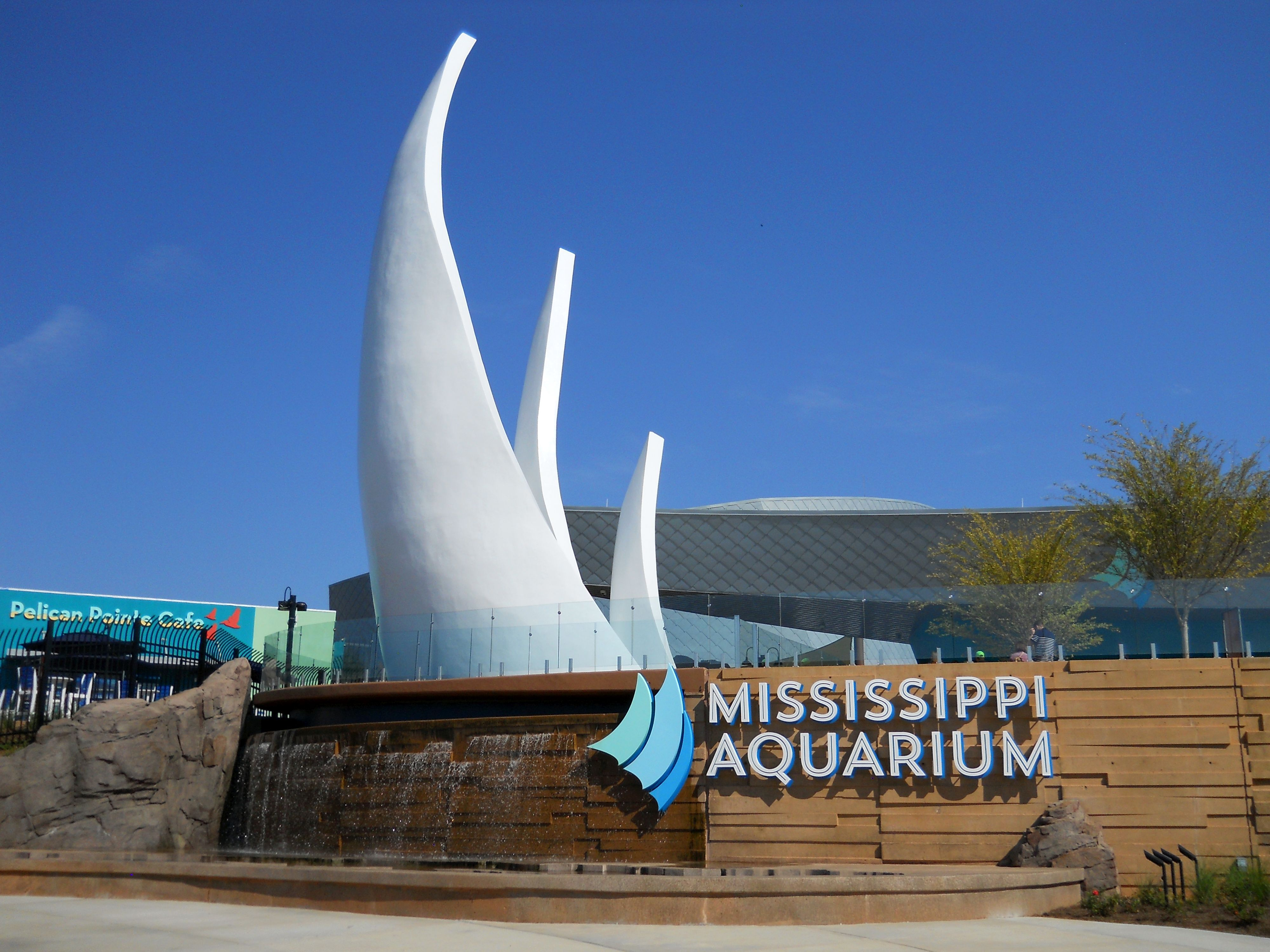
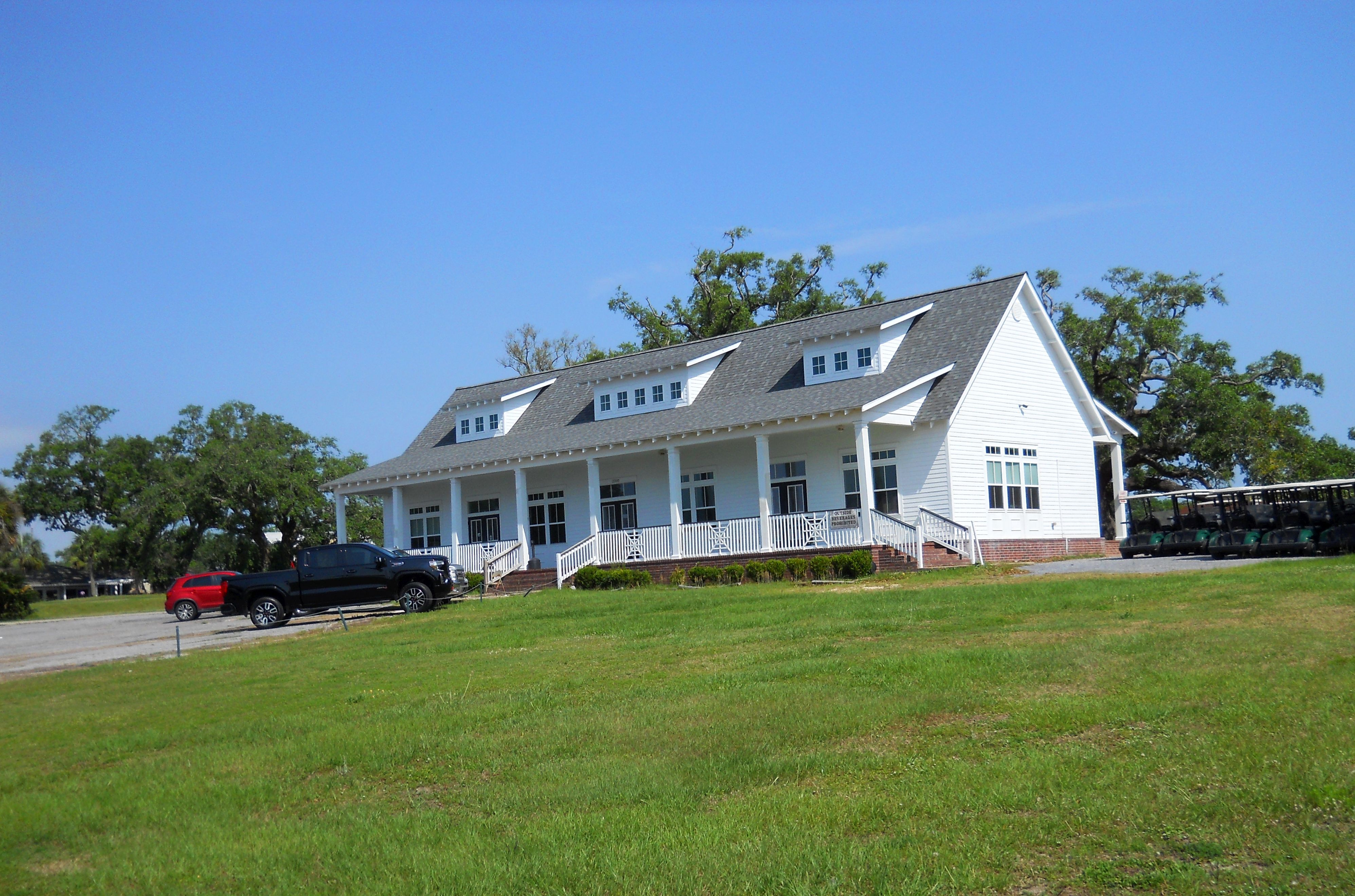
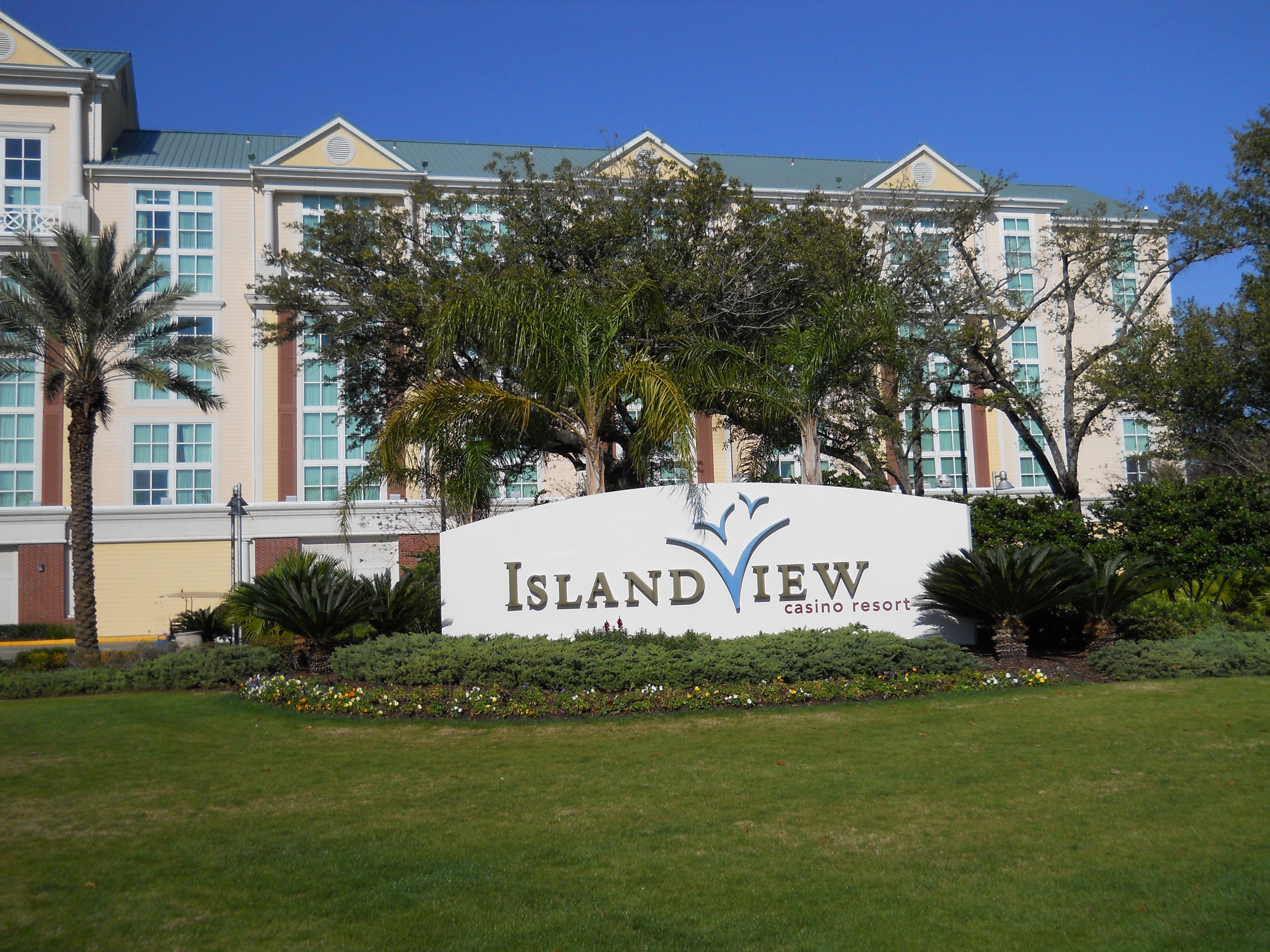
- Downtown Gulfport Naval Construction Battalion Center Mississippi Aquarium Great Southern Golf Club Island View Casino

- Flag Seal Logo
- Motto: Anchored in Excellence
- Interactive map of Gulfport, Mississippi
- Location within Mississippi Location within the United States
- Coordinates: 30°24′6″N 89°4′34″W
- Country: United States
- State: Mississippi
- County: Harrison
- Incorporated: July 28, 1898 (128 years ago)

Government
  - Type: Strong mayor–council
  - Body: Gulfport City Council
  - Mayor: Hugh Keating (R)

Area
  - City: 64.01 sq mi (165.79 km^{2})
  - Land: 55.62 sq mi (144.06 km^{2})
  - Water: 8.39 sq mi (21.73 km^{2})
- Elevation: 20 ft (6 m)

Population (2020)
  - City: 72,926
  - Density: 1,311.1/sq mi (506.21/km^{2})
  - Urban: 236,344 (US: 169th)
  - Urban density: 1,401.5/sq mi (541.1/km^{2})
  - Metro: 416,259 (US: 133rd)
- Demonym: Gulfporter
- Time zone: UTC−6 (CST)
  - Summer (DST): UTC−5 (CDT)
- ZIP Codes: 39501-39503, 39505-39507
- Area code: 228
- FIPS code: 28-29700
- GNIS feature ID: 0670771
- Website: www.gulfport-ms.gov

Gulfport (/ˈɡʌlfˌpɔːrt/ GUHLF-port) is a port city in Harrison County, Mississippi, United States, and its co-county seat along with the adjacent city of Biloxi. It had a population of 72,926 at the 2020 census, making it the second-most populous city in Mississippi after Jackson. The Gulfport–Biloxi metropolitan area had a population of 416,259. Gulfport lies along the Gulf Coast of the United States in southern Mississippi, taking its name from its port on the Gulf Coast on the Mississippi Sound.

Gulfport emerged from two earlier settlements, Mississippi City and Handsboro. Founded in 1887 by William H. Hardy as a terminus for the Gulf and Ship Island Railroad, the city was further developed by Joseph T. Jones, a Philadelphia-based oil tycoon who funded the railroad, harbor, and channel dredging. The city was officially incorporated in 1898. By the early 20th century, Gulfport had become the largest lumber export city in the United States, though this faded with the depletion of Mississippi's Piney Woods. The city transitioned into tourism through its white beaches, grand hotels, and significant casino gaming operations.

The largest sectors of Gulfport's economy include military operations, tourism, healthcare, and maritime commerce. The city is home to the Naval Construction Battalion Center, Gulfport Combat Readiness Training Center, and Mississippi Gulf Coast Community College. The Port of Gulfport serves as one of the busiest ports in the Gulf of Mexico, while Gulfport-Biloxi International Airport provides commercial air service to the region. Despite significant impacts from Hurricane Camille in 1969 and Hurricane Katrina in 2005, the city has consistently rebuilt and expanded its infrastructure and facilities.

== History ==
Two villages predated the founding of Gulfport: Mississippi City, located along the gulf, and Handsboro, founded in the 1800s along the northern bayous. Mississippi City was born out of the Mississippi City Company that was formed in 1837 to build a town to serve as the terminus for the Gulf and Ship Island Railroad. The purpose of the railroad was to transfer yellow pine for ship-based trade. While a depression led to the abandonment of the railroad, the town was nevertheless built and later made the county seat upon the creation of Harrison County in 1841.

The Gulf and Ship Island Railroad company was later reorganized and selected William H. Hardy as its president. Desiring to connect the railroad from the town of Hattiesburg, which he founded, to the coast, he steered away from Mississippi City because of its lack of proximity to deep water. He selected the site of Gulfport in 1887, and the town was founded that year. Because of the cost of the project, Hardy went bankrupt in 1893, and the town became a ghost town. However, Philadelphia oil tycoon Joseph T. Jones purchased the company. Jones funded not only the railroad, but much of the city, the harbor, and the dredging of the channel. In 1888, the city was given its name from the Jackson Clarion-Ledger editor, R. H. Henry after a conversation between him and Hardy. On July 28, 1898, the city was incorporated. In 1902, Harrison County voted to move the county seat to Gulfport.

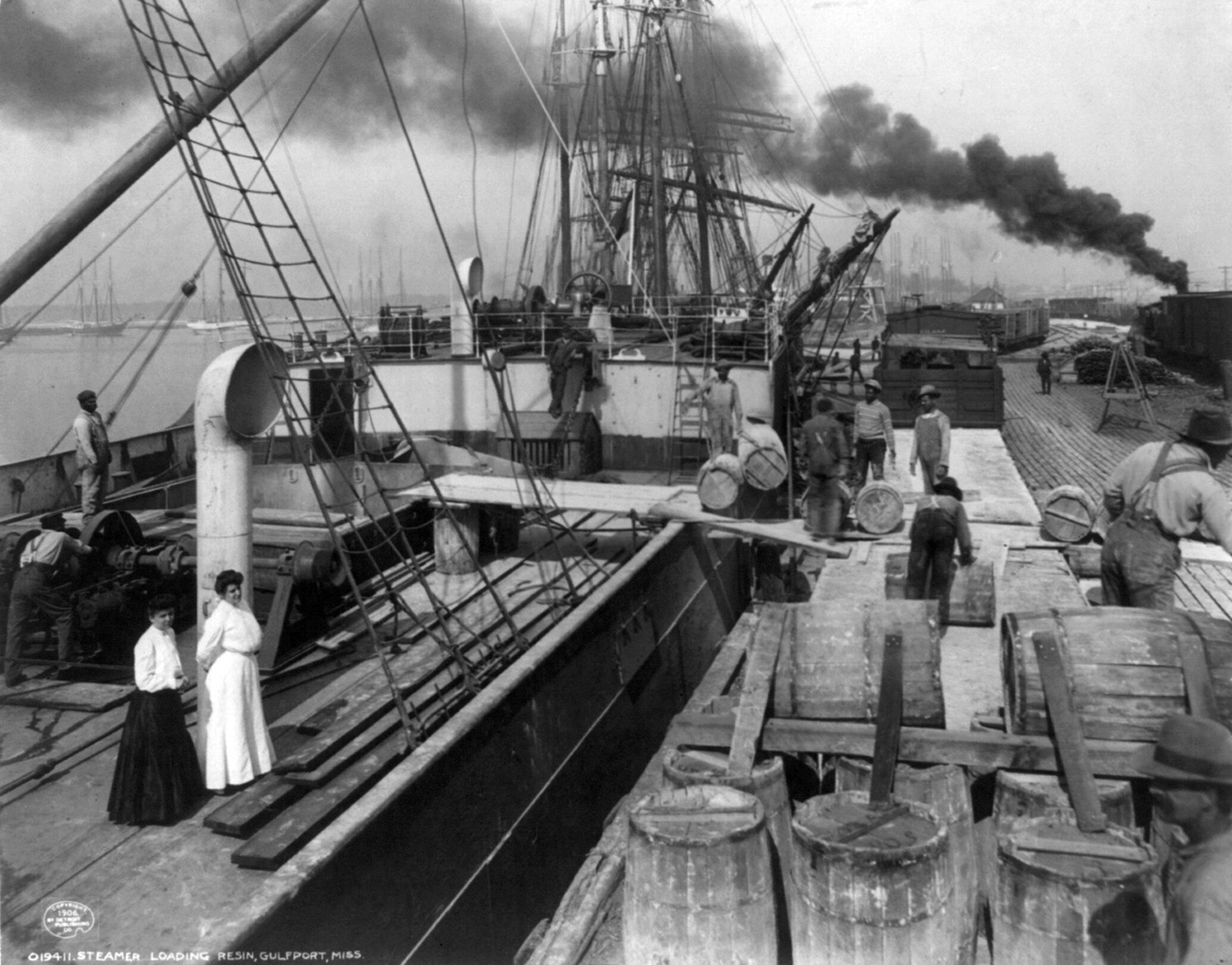
Steamer loading resin in Gulfport, 1906

In 1900, the railroad was completed, and in 1902 the Port of Gulfport was completed. On April 28, 1904, the Treasury Department changed the port of entry for the district of the Pearl River from Shieldsboro to Gulfport. At the time, the Gulfport port had greater ease of access than comparable ports like Mobile or New Orleans. The port soon made Gulfport the largest lumber export city in the United States, shipping over 293 million feet of lumber in 1906; however, the depletion of the yellow pine ended this status in the early 20th century.

At the turn of the century, Gulfport began to experience notable growth: by 1900, the population hit 1,000, and by 1910, over 6,000. As a result, the fire department and sanitation services were established, and by 1903, the county courthouse was built. The Louisville and Nashville railroad line also began serving the city around this time at Gulfport Station (then the Union Depot). In 1910, the U.S. Post Office and Customhouse was built, and in March 1916, the construction of a Carnegie Library was announced by the mayor. Other impressive developments include the building of the Great Southern Hotel, the construction of an electric plant (later managed by Mississippi Power), and a streetcar line.

In 1917, the city was set to hold the Mississippi Centennial Exposition, but upon the U.S. entering World War I, the plans were abandoned. The building complex created for the exposition was transferred to the U.S. Navy as a training center. The lands were eventually transitioned into a Veterans Administration Hospital, which operated until 2005. The 1920s saw a construction boom with buildings like the Hotel Markham and the Bank of Gulfport being completed. By the 1930s, the population had increased to over 12,000, with growth continuing into the 1940s.

During World War II, two military bases were built in Gulfport. Camp Hollyday, established in 1942, would later become the home base for the Naval Construction Battalion Center. Also in 1942, the U.S. Army Air Corps constructed a training base for heavy bomber crews known as Gulfport Army Airfield. After the war, the base was declared excess, and the city purchased most of the facilities for a new Gulfport Municipal Airport (the first airport was dedicated in 1930). In 1954, the U.S. Air Force resumed use of the facilities they still owned as Gulfport Air Force Base to train Air National Guard units. This lasted until 1958, when the facilities were transferred to the Mississippi Air National Guard as the Gulfport Combat Readiness Training Center.

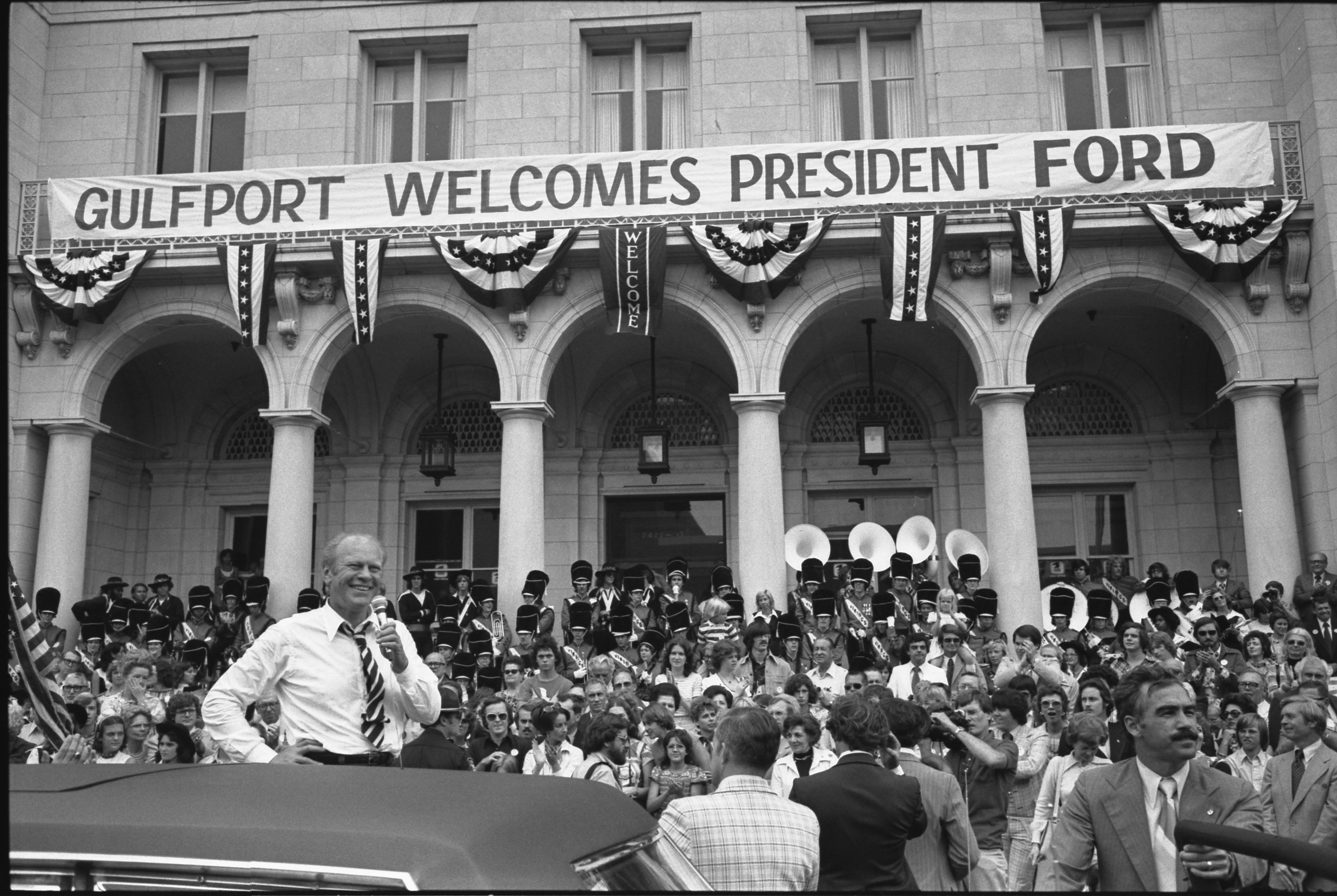
U.S. President Gerald Ford visited Gulfport during his 1976 reelection campaign

By 1950, the population had grown to around 22,000 and by 1960, 30,000. Around the time of the Biloxi wade-ins, Gulfport had its own protest wade-in in 1960. In 1965, the city annexed the original Mississippi City and Handsboro area. On August 17, 1969, Gulfport and the Mississippi Gulf Coast were hit by Hurricane Camille, the second-strongest hurricane to make landfall in the U.S. in recorded history. The most heavily damaged part of Gulfport was the waterfront areas: storm waters in Gulfport reached 21 feet, and the port of Gulfport was nearly completely destroyed. Otherwise, the downtown and inland areas received small amounts of structural damage.

In 1976, the Armed Forces Retirement Home relocated from Philadelphia to Gulfport on the land of the former Gulf Coast Military Academy. The facility was destroyed in 2005 by Hurricane Katrina but rebuilt as a much larger facility in 2010. A new county courthouse was built in 1977. In 1993, the city opened its first two casinos, and later that year in December, the city annexed 33 square miles (85 km^{2}) north of Gulfport. This annexed land included Turkey Creek, a historic community founded by emancipated slaves before the founding of Gulfport. In 2003, the Dan M. Russell Jr. United States Courthouse was completed.

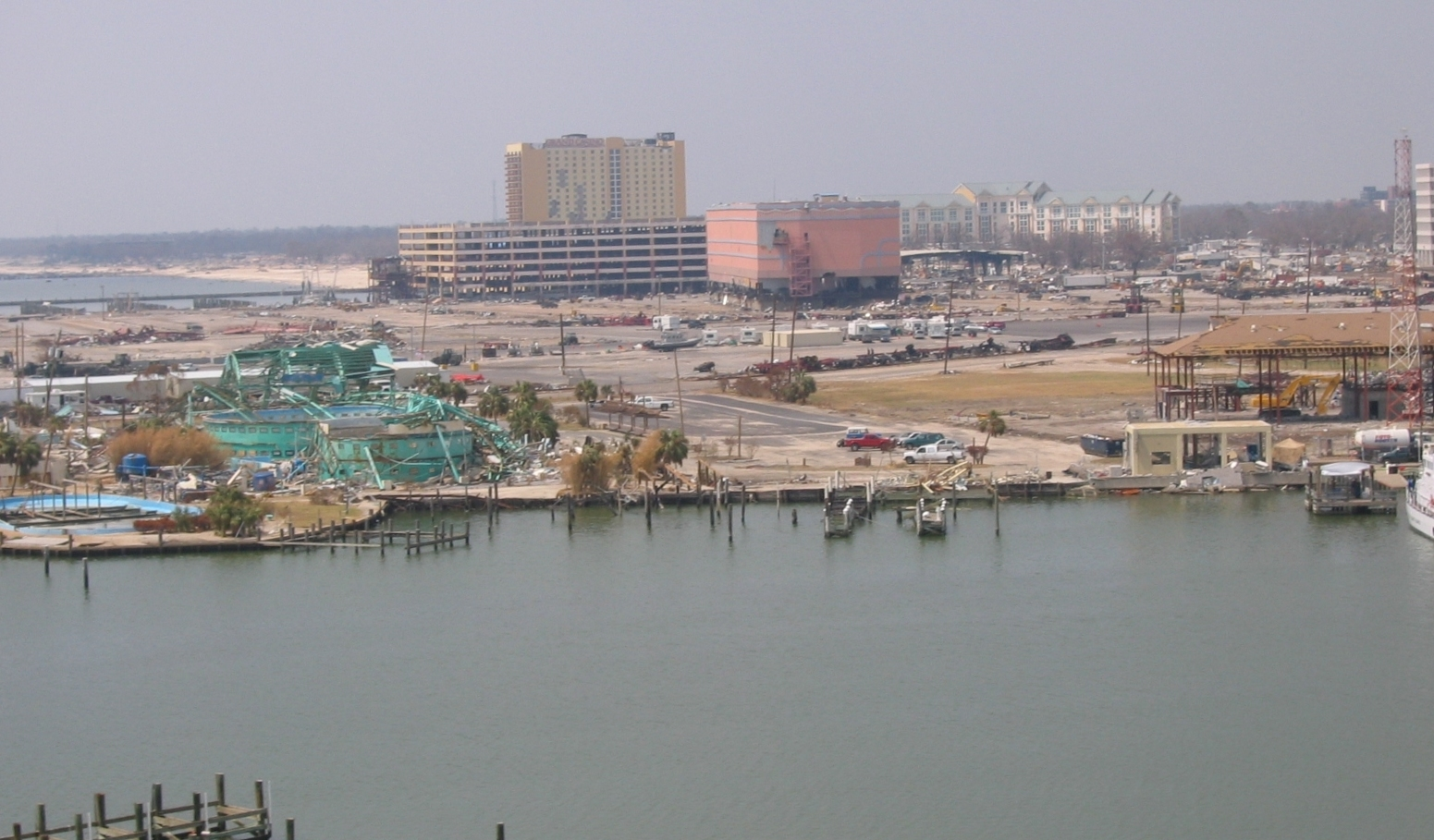
Damage to the Marine Life Oceanarium and casinos after Hurricane Katrina

On August 29, 2005, Gulfport was hit by the strong eastern side of Hurricane Katrina with wind speeds of at least 100 miles per hour (160 km/h) and storm surge of at least 19 feet (5.8 m). 9,571 houses were damaged or destroyed, and the town was left with a $3 million deficit. The city received over $300 million in federal aid which it used to repair infrastructure and facilities for essential services. In 2020, on the 15th anniversary of Hurricane Katrina, the Mississippi Aquarium opened, replacing a dolphin-oriented facility destroyed by the hurricane.

== Geography ==
According to the United States Census Bureau, the city had a total area of 64.2 sq mi (166.4 km^{2}), of which 56.9 sq mi (147.4 km^{2}) is land and 7.3 sq mi (19.0 km^{2}) (11.40%) is water.

The Gulfport Formation in Harrison County is described as barrier ridge composed of white, medium- to fine-grained sand, yellow-orange near surface. Thickness ranges from 5.0 to 9.5 m. It overlies Biloxi Formation. Age is late Pleistocene.

Gulfport Formation is limited to a 1- to 3-km-wide discontinuous barrier ridge belt that borders the Gulf mainland shore. It commonly overlies Prairie Formation (alluvium) landward and Biloxi Formation (shelf deposits) near shore. The formation grades upward from poorly to moderately sorted shoreface sands to foreshore sand and dunes. The unit extends from Gulfport, MS, eastward to the mouth of the Ochlockonee River, Franklin County, Florida and was deposited during the Sangamonian.

=== Neighborhoods ===
The city listed 39 official neighborhoods in 2000. These neighborhoods are sometimes subdivisions or accumulations of gradual home development. These include:

- Lyman
- Orange Grove
- Biloxi River
- Lorraine
- The Reserve
- Pine Hills
- Bayou Bernard Industrial District
- Bayou View North
- The Island
- Fernwood
- Handsboro
- College Park
- Silver Ridge
- Great Southern
- Mississippi City
- Gooden
- East Park
- Bayou View South
- Magnolia Grove
- East Beach
- Broadmoor
- Soria City
- CBD
- State Port & Jones Park
- West Beach
- Gaston Point
- Fairgrounds
- Central Gulfport
- 25th Avenue Commercial
- Original Gulfport
- Mid-City
- Brickyard Bayou
- North Gulfport Industrial Center
- Turkey Creek
- North Gulfport
- CB Base
- Gulfport Heights
- Forest Heights
- Sports Super Complex

=== Climate ===
Gulfport has a humid subtropical climate, which is strongly moderated by the Gulf of Mexico. Winters are short and generally mild; cold spells do occur, but seldom last long. Snow flurries are rare in the city, with no notable accumulation occurring most years. Summers are generally long, hot and humid, though the city's proximity to the Gulf prevents extreme summer highs, as seen farther inland. Gulfport is subject to extreme weather, most notably tropical storm activity through the Gulf of Mexico. The all-time record high for the city is 107 °F (41.7 °C), set on August 26, 2023, and the record coldest is 1 °F (−17.2 °C) on February 12, 1899. Climate records for the city date back to 1893; however, until 1998 records were stitched with neighboring Biloxi.

Climate data for Gulfport, Mississippi (Gulfport-Biloxi Int'l) 1991–2020 normals, extremes 1893–present
Month	Jan	Feb	Mar	Apr	May	Jun	Jul	Aug	Sep	Oct	Nov	Dec	Year
Record high °F (°C)	82 (28)	87 (31)	89 (32)	94 (34)	98 (37)	103 (39)	103 (39)	107 (42)	101 (38)	98 (37)	88 (31)	83 (28)	107 (42)
Mean maximum °F (°C)	73.8 (23.2)	75.5 (24.2)	81.4 (27.4)	84.5 (29.2)	90.5 (32.5)	94.6 (34.8)	96.9 (36.1)	96.2 (35.7)	93.8 (34.3)	88.6 (31.4)	81.2 (27.3)	75.9 (24.4)	98.2 (36.8)
Mean daily maximum °F (°C)	61.3 (16.3)	64.8 (18.2)	70.4 (21.3)	76.5 (24.7)	83.6 (28.7)	88.7 (31.5)	90.4 (32.4)	90.7 (32.6)	87.8 (31.0)	79.9 (26.6)	70.0 (21.1)	63.5 (17.5)	77.3 (25.2)
Daily mean °F (°C)	51.8 (11.0)	55.5 (13.1)	61.1 (16.2)	67.5 (19.7)	75.0 (23.9)	80.9 (27.2)	82.7 (28.2)	82.6 (28.1)	79.2 (26.2)	70.0 (21.1)	59.6 (15.3)	54.0 (12.2)	68.3 (20.2)
Mean daily minimum °F (°C)	42.4 (5.8)	46.2 (7.9)	51.8 (11.0)	58.4 (14.7)	66.4 (19.1)	73.2 (22.9)	74.9 (23.8)	74.6 (23.7)	70.6 (21.4)	60.1 (15.6)	49.2 (9.6)	44.6 (7.0)	59.4 (15.2)
Mean minimum °F (°C)	24.6 (−4.1)	29.3 (−1.5)	33.1 (0.6)	41.3 (5.2)	52.2 (11.2)	64.8 (18.2)	69.8 (21.0)	68.7 (20.4)	58.6 (14.8)	43.1 (6.2)	32.3 (0.2)	29.1 (−1.6)	23.3 (−4.8)
Record low °F (°C)	4 (−16)	1 (−17)	22 (−6)	34 (1)	43 (6)	52 (11)	58 (14)	59 (15)	42 (6)	33 (1)	24 (−4)	9 (−13)	1 (−17)
Average precipitation inches (mm)	4.87 (124)	4.44 (113)	5.22 (133)	5.51 (140)	4.74 (120)	6.89 (175)	7.21 (183)	6.53 (166)	5.18 (132)	3.71 (94)	4.03 (102)	4.49 (114)	62.82 (1,596)
Average precipitation days (≥ 0.01 In)	8.9	9.3	8.9	7.5	7.3	12.0	12.8	13.9	9.2	7.9	8.3	10.5	116.5
Source: NOAA

== Demographics ==
Historical population
Census	Pop.	Note	%±
1900	1,060		—
1910	6,386		502.5%
1920	8,157		27.7%
1930	12,547		53.8%
1940	15,105		20.4%
1950	22,659		50.0%
1960	30,204		33.3%
1970	40,791		35.1%
1980	39,676		−2.7%
1990	40,775		2.8%
2000	71,127		74.4%
2010	67,793		−4.7%
2020	72,926		7.6%
U.S. Decennial Census; 2018 Estimate 2020 census

=== Racial and ethnic composition ===
Gulfport city, Mississippi – Racial and ethnic composition Note: the US Census treats Hispanic/Latino as an ethnic category. This table excludes Latinos from the racial categories and assigns them to a separate category. Hispanics/Latinos may be of any race.
Race / Ethnicity (NH = Non-Hispanic)	Pop. 2000	Pop. 2010	Pop. 2020	% 2000	% 2010	% 2020
White alone (NH)	43,337	37,038	34,382	60.93%	54.63%	47.15%
Black or African American alone (NH)	23,692	24,266	28,287	33.31%	35.92%	38.79%
Native American or Alaska Native alone (NH)	284	223	293	0.25%	0.24%	0.4%
Asian alone (NH)	872	1,134	1,147	1.53%	1.95%	1.57%
Native Hawaiian or Pacific Islander alone (NH)	62	87	114	0.05%	0.05%	0.16%
Other race alone (NH)	72	69	239	0.12%	0.13%	0.20%
Mixed race or Multiracial (NH)	994	1,457	3,449	1.14%	1.50%	4.86%
Hispanic or Latino (any race)	1,814	3,519	5,015	2.11%	5.50%	6.88%
Total	71,127	67,793	72,926	100.00%	100.00%	100.00%

=== 2020 census ===
As of the 2020 census, Gulfport had a population of 72,926. The median age was 37.4 years. 23.7% of residents were under the age of 18 and 16.1% of residents were 65 years of age or older. For every 100 females there were 93.4 males, and for every 100 females age 18 and over there were 90.1 males age 18 and over.

99.3% of residents lived in urban areas, while 0.7% lived in rural areas.

There were 28,865 households in Gulfport, of which 30.8% had children under the age of 18 living in them. Of all households, 34.8% were married-couple households, 20.3% were households with a male householder and no spouse or partner present, and 36.7% were households with a female householder and no spouse or partner present. About 30.4% of all households were made up of individuals and 11.4% had someone living alone who was 65 years of age or older. Of the total households, 15,584 were family households.

There were 32,737 housing units, of which 11.8% were vacant. The homeowner vacancy rate was 2.5% and the rental vacancy rate was 10.6%.

Racial composition as of the 2020 census
Race	Number	Percent
White	35,356	48.5%
Black or African American	28,508	39.1%
American Indian and Alaska Native	383	0.5%
Asian	1,183	1.6%
Native Hawaiian and Other Pacific Islander	119	0.2%
Some other race	2,347	3.2%
Two or more races	5,030	6.9%

Non-Hispanic residents were 47.15% White, 38.79% Black or African American, 0.4% American Indian or Alaska Native, 1.57% Asian, 0.16% Pacific Islander, 0.20% some other race, and 4.86% multiracial, while 6.88% of residents were Hispanic or Latino of any race.

=== 2010 census ===
The 2010 census recorded 67,793 people in the city.

=== 2000 census ===
At the 2000 census, Gulfport had 71,127 residents.

=== Metropolitan area ===
Gulfport is part of the Gulfport–Biloxi metropolitan area, which has a population of 416,259 as of 2021 estimates.

== Economy ==
According to Gulfport's 2020 Comprehensive Annual Financial Report, the top employers in the city were:

#	Employer	# of Employees
1	Memorial Hospital	4,953
2	Naval Construction Battalion Center	4,876
3	Gulfport School District	2,724
4	Harrison County School District	2,086
5	Island View Casino	1,976
6	Hancock Bank	864
7	Mississippi Power	728
8	Trent Lott Training	636
9	Walmart	585
10	City of Gulfport	564

=== Tourism ===
From its beginnings as a lumber port, Gulfport evolved into a diversified city. With about 6.7 miles (10.8 kilometres) of white sand beaches along the Gulf of Mexico, Gulfport has become a tourism destination, due in large part to Mississippi's coast casinos. Gulfport has served as host to popular cultural events such as the "World's Largest Fishing Rodeo," "Cruisin' the Coast" (a week of classic cars), "Black Spring Break" and "Smokin' the Sound" (speedboat races). Gulfport is a thriving residential community with a strong mercantile center. There are historic neighborhoods and home sites, as well as diverse shopping opportunities and several motels scattered throughout to accommodate golfing, gambling, and water-sport tourism. Gulfport is also home to the Island View Casino, one of twelve casinos on the Mississippi Gulf Coast.

== Arts and culture ==
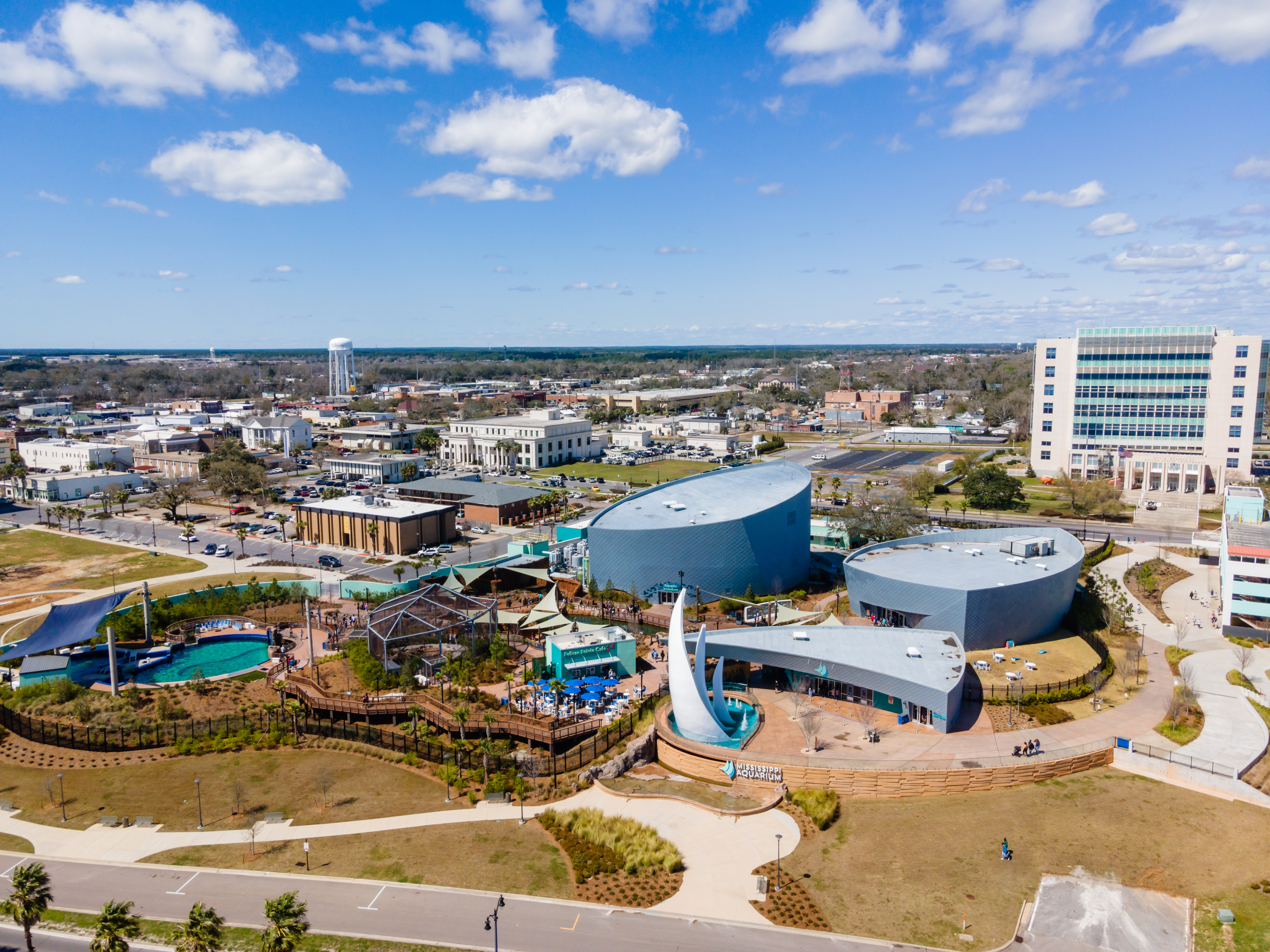
Mississippi Aquarium

Mississippi Aquarium opened August 29, 2020. The 5.8-acre (2.3 ha) complex incorporates both indoor and outdoor habitats with more than 200 species of animals and 50 species of native plants.

Fort Massachusetts is a fort on West Ship Island along the coast. It was built following the War of 1812 and remained in use until 1903. Currently, it is a historical tourist attraction within the Gulf Islands National Seashore.

Turkey Creek Community Historic District is a settlement established by emancipated African Americans during the Reconstruction Era after the American Civil War.

== Government ==
Gulfport uses a strong mayor-council form of government. The city is subdivided into seven wards, where members are elected as part of the Gulfport City Council. The current mayor is Hugh Keating who is serving his first term in office.

The Gulfport Police Department has 160 sworn personnel and 80 civilian staff. It is assisted by the U.S. Coast Guard, which operates 9 boats out of the port of Gulfport, 4 of which are Patrol Boats. The Gulfport station has 110 members which include Active, Reserve and Coast Guard Auxiliary who respond to an average of 300 search and rescue cases annually.

The Gulfport Fire Department was founded in 1908 and currently provides fire suppression, HAZMAT response, and technical rescue services within the city limits of Gulfport, Mississippi. The GFD operates out of 11 active stations and is staffed by professional firefighters. The GFD works in conjunction with American Medical Response for EMS related emergencies.

== Education ==
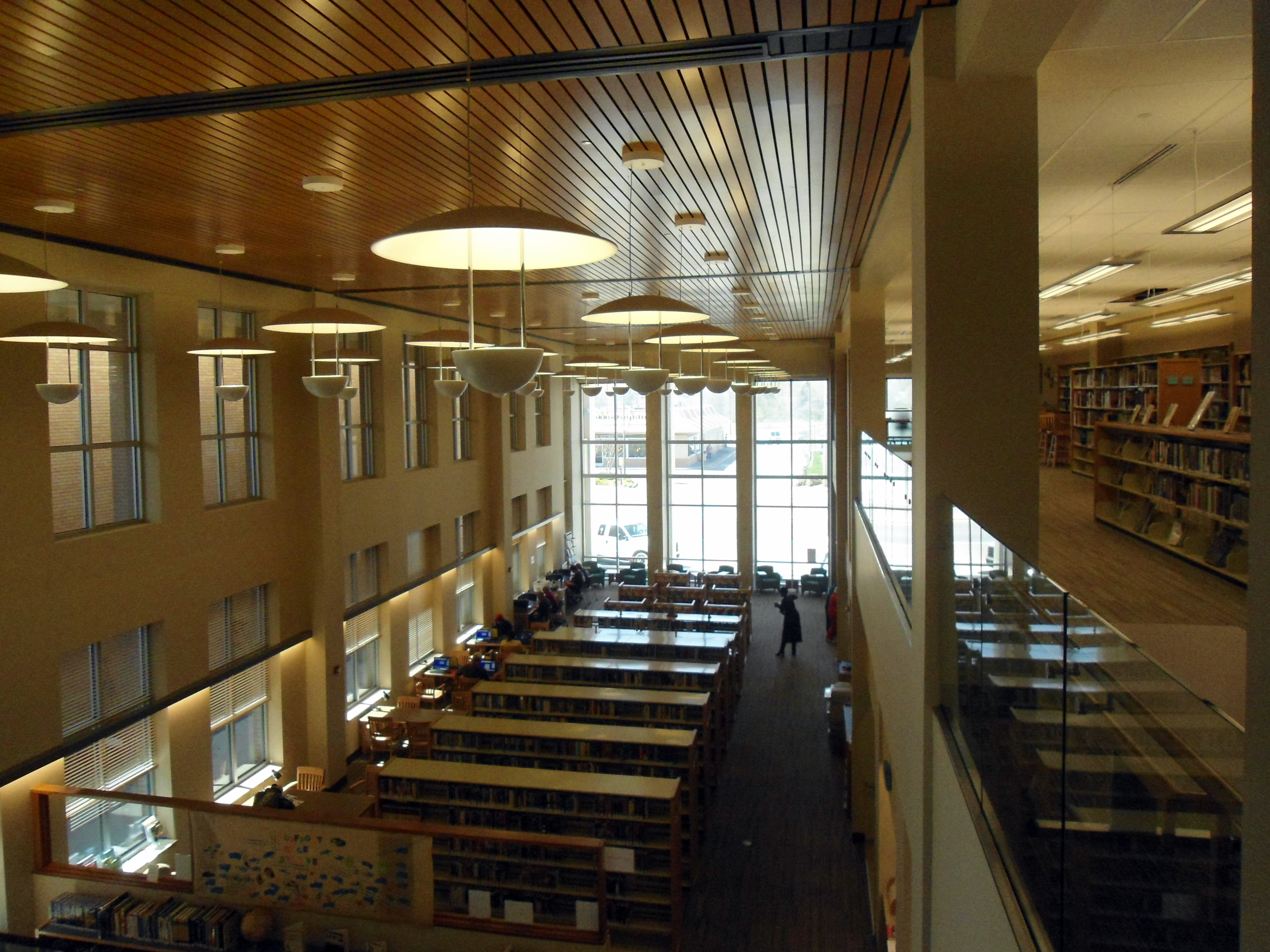
Upstairs in Gulfport Public Library

The City of Gulfport is served by the Gulfport School District and the Harrison County School District. The Harrison County Campus of Mississippi Gulf Coast Community College is also located in Gulfport.

Before Hurricane Katrina, William Carey University had a satellite campus in Gulfport. In 2009, the university moved to its new Tradition Campus, constructed off Mississippi Highway 67 in north Harrison County.

The Gulf Park Campus of the University of Southern Mississippi is located in Long Beach, just west of Gulfport. In 2012, repairs and renovations to campus buildings were still in progress following extensive damage in 2005 by Hurricane Katrina.

== Media ==
Headquartered in Gulfport, The Sun Herald is the local newspaper for Gulfport, Biloxi, and other Gulf Coast cities. The paper won the 2006 Pulitzer Prize in journalism for its Katrina coverage.

There are six FM radio stations licensed in Gulfport: W209CF 89.7, WA0Y 91.7 (American Family Radio), WGBL 96.7, WGCM-FM 102.3, WAIP-LP 103.9, and WLGF 107.1 (K-Love). There are also three AM radio stations licensed in Gulfport, all with FM translators: WQFX 1130 (W254DJ 98.7), WGCM 1240 (W265DH 100.9), and WROA 1390 (W261CU 100.1).

It is also served by two television stations, the ABC affiliate WLOX and CBS affiliate WLOX-DT2, as well as the Fox affiliate WXXV on 25.1, NBC affiliate on 25.2, CW+ affiliate on 25.3, and Defy TV affiliate on 25.4. WLOX won the Peabody Award for its Hurricane Katrina coverage.

Movies and TV series filmed in Gulfport include the 2016 film Precious Cargo, the 2017 TV movie Christmas in Mississippi, the 2015 TV series The Astronaut Wives Club, and other productions.

== Transportation ==
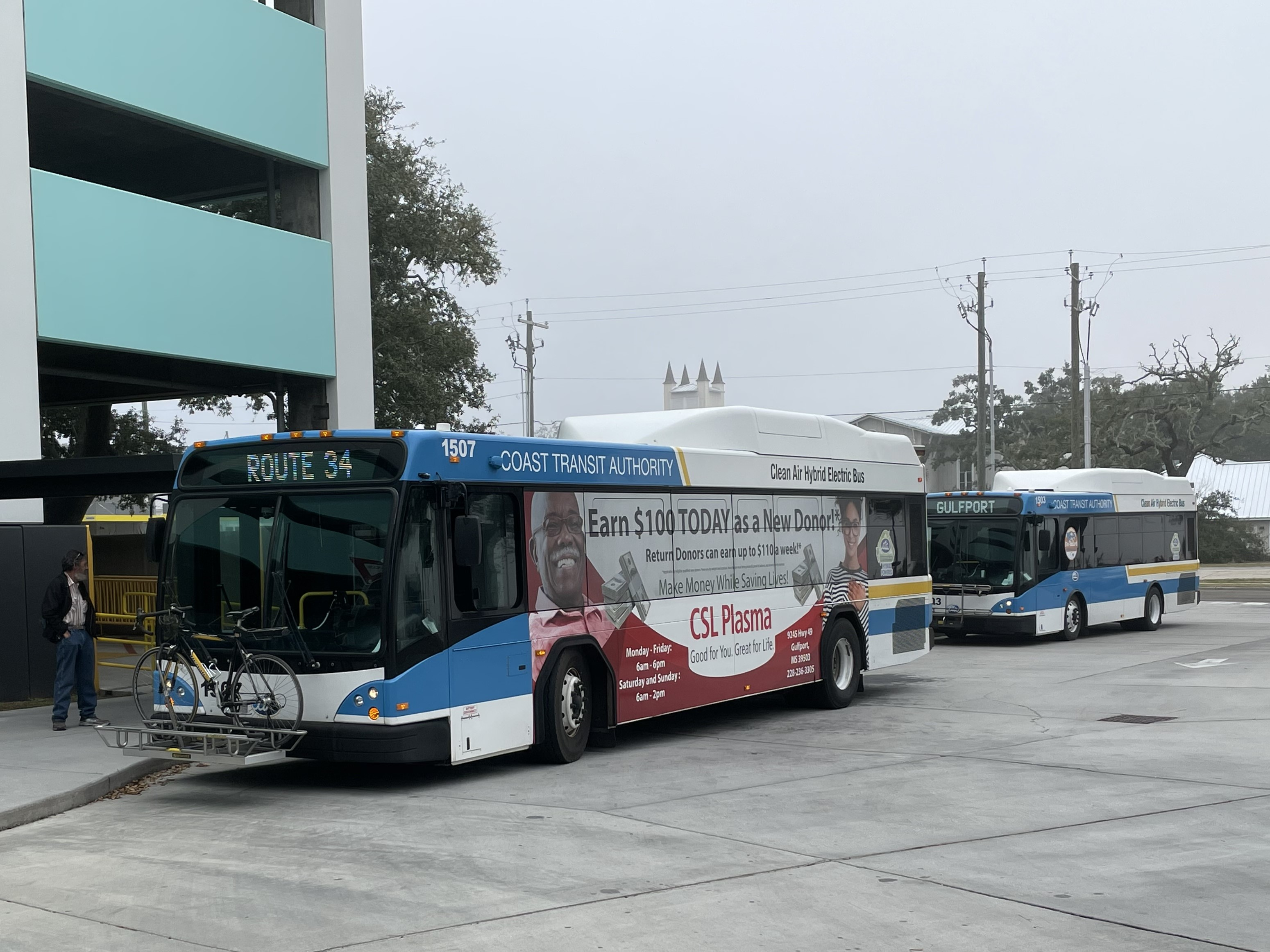
Coast Transit Authority buses at the transit center in Gulfport

Gulfport/Biloxi and the Gulf Coast area is served by the Gulfport–Biloxi International Airport.

The Coast Transit Authority provides bus service to the region with fixed-route and paratransit services.

Major roads and highways serve Gulfport. Interstate 10 runs east–west through the middle section of Gulfport. U.S. 90, following the coast in this region, runs east–west through the downtown area. U.S. 49 from the north terminates in Gulfport.

Until Hurricane Katrina in 2005, Amtrak's Sunset Limited from Los Angeles to Orlando made stops in Gulfport station. Well into the 1960s, the Louisville and Nashville ran several trains daily, making stops in Gulfport--Crescent, Gulf Wind, Humming Bird, Pan-American and Piedmont Limited—varied destinations including New Orleans, Cincinnati, Atlanta, New York City and Jacksonville. Amtrak service returned on August 18, 2025 with the establishment of the Mardi Gras Service, which connected Gulfport to cities along the Gulf Coast through Gulfport Station.

== Notable people ==
- Mahmoud Abdul-Rauf, former NBA point guard for the Denver Nuggets, Sacramento Kings and Vancouver Grizzlies
- Stacey Abrams, American politician, lawyer, and author
- Thomas H. Anderson, Jr., Ambassador of the United States to Barbados, Dominica, St. Lucia, Antigua, St. Vincent, and St. Christopher-Nevis-Anguilla from 1984 to 1986, was born in Gulfport
- Tommy Armstrong, Jr., quarterback for the Nebraska Cornhuskers
- Jerome Barkum, former wide receiver and tight end for the New York Jets from 1972 to 1983 in the National Football League
- Milton Barney, 1990 AFL Ironman of the Year
- William Joel Blass, attorney and educator
- Katie Booth (scientist), biomedical chemist and civil rights activist
- Timmy Bowers, professional basketball player
- Rod Davis, professional football player, played for the Minnesota Vikings
- Brett Favre, quarterback in the National Football League for the Green Bay Packers, New York Jets and Minnesota Vikings, born in Gulfport
- William H. Hardy, co-founder of the city of Gulfport
- Josh Hayes, professional motorcycle roadracer, AMA Superbike Championship title winner
- William Gardner Hewes, politician and Mayor of Gulfport
- Jonathan Holder, Major League Baseball pitcher
- Boyce Holleman, attorney, politician and actor
- Jaimoe, original member and drummer of the Allman Brothers Band, grew up in Gulfport
- Joseph T. Jones, co-founder of the city of Gulfport
- Matt Lawton, former Major League Baseball player best known for his stint with the Minnesota Twins
- Matt Luke, former head coach of the Ole Miss Rebels football team of the University of Mississippi.
- Stanford Morse (1926–2002), member of the Mississippi State Senate, 1956–1964; Republican candidate for lieutenant governor in 1963.
- Brittney Reese, long jumper, Olympic gold medalist
- John C. Robinson (1903–1954), "The Brown Condor", aviator and civil rights activist
- Stuart Roosa, Colonel, US Air Force, Apollo 14 astronaut, Command Module Pilot. Brought seeds to moon that germinated in space
- Anna St. John, federal judge of United States District Court for the Eastern District of Louisiana
- Ellis Stratakos Jazz musician known for Gulf Coast jazz
- Ethan Surowiec, baseball player
- Tiffany Travis, former WNBA Basketball player, played for Charlotte Sting
- Natasha Trethewey, Pulitzer Prize winning poet, former Poet Laureate of the United States, and Professor at Emory University, born in Gulfport
- Tim Young, professional baseball player, played for the Montreal Expos and the Boston Red Sox

== See also ==
- Dan M. Russell Jr. United States Courthouse
- Grass Lawn (Gulfport, Mississippi)
- Great Southern Golf Club
- Gulf and Ship Island Railroad
- Gulf Coast Military Academy
- Gulfport Army Air Field Hangar
- Gulfport Veterans Administration Medical Center Historic District
- Historic Grand Hotels on the Mississippi Gulf Coast
- Mississippi Aquarium
- Mississippi City, Mississippi
- National Register of Historic Places listings in Harrison County, Mississippi
- Old Gulfport High School
- Turkey Creek Community Historic District
- United States Post Office and Customhouse (Gulfport, Mississippi)
- United States container ports
