= Joseph T. Jones =

American businessman (1842–1916)

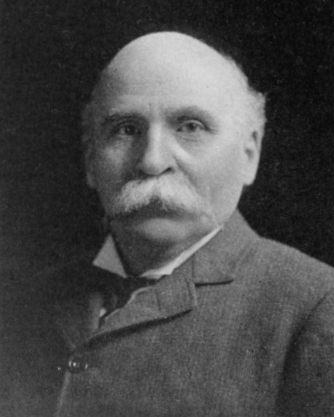
- Jones, c. 1908
- Born: Joseph Thomas Jones; June 11, 1842; Philadelphia, Pennsylvania
- Died: December 6, 1916 (aged 74); Buffalo, New York
- Resting place: Forest Lawn Cemetery
- Occupation: Businessman
- Spouse: Melodia E. Blackmarr (m. 1876)
- Children: 2

Joseph Thomas Jones (June 11, 1842 – December 6, 1916) was an American entrepreneur who built his fortune as an oil producer. He funded construction of the Gulf and Ship Island Railroad in Mississippi, co-founded the City of Gulfport and developed its seaport.

== Early life ==
Joseph T. Jones was born to Albanus A. and Jane (Thomas) Jones in Philadelphia, Pennsylvania, on June 11, 1842. He was educated at public schools, and worked in the stairbuilding trade with an uncle for two years.

== Military service ==
In 1861, at age 19, Jones enlisted in the Union Army during the American Civil War and was assigned to Company H, 91st Pennsylvania Volunteer Infantry. Jones served as Quartermaster Sergeant, Second Lieutenant, and First Lieutenant. At the Battle of the Wilderness in May 1864, Jones was appointed acting Captain.

In June 1864, at the Battle of Cold Harbor, Jones was wounded in both feet. He was sent home to Philadelphia to recover from his wounds and was discharged in September 1864.

== Oil ventures ==
Although crippled from war wounds, Jones used his war-time savings and bank loans to begin drilling for oil in western Pennsylvania in 1865. After 12 dry holes, Jones finally hit oil in 1867. Jones fortune began to change in the Bradford oil fields with the development of more than 500 oil-producing wells and incorporation of the Bradford Oil Company. To move crude oil to railheads, Jones invested in oil pipelines which produced greater dividends than the oil wells. By 1883, Jones was known as the largest crude oil producer in the United States. In the 1890s, Jones began investing in oil ventures in West Virginia, thereby increasing his wealth.

== Mississippi investments ==
Through mutual friends, Jones heard of a potential investment in a railroad venture in south Mississippi, which included 63,000 acres (25,500 hectares) of southern yellow pines that were ready for harvest. Although the unfinished Gulf and Ship Island Railroad (G&SIRR) was in bankruptcy, Jones formed the Bradford Construction Company with other investors and bought the railroad. Using his fortune from oil production, Jones finished construction of the G&SIRR, bought out his partners in the Bradford Construction Company, and merged with the railroad to form the Gulf and Ship Island Railroad Company. Along with William H. Hardy, Jones co-founded the City of Gulfport as the railroad's southernmost terminal and had a deep-water channel dredged in the Gulf of Mexico, creating a harbor and the port of Gulfport.

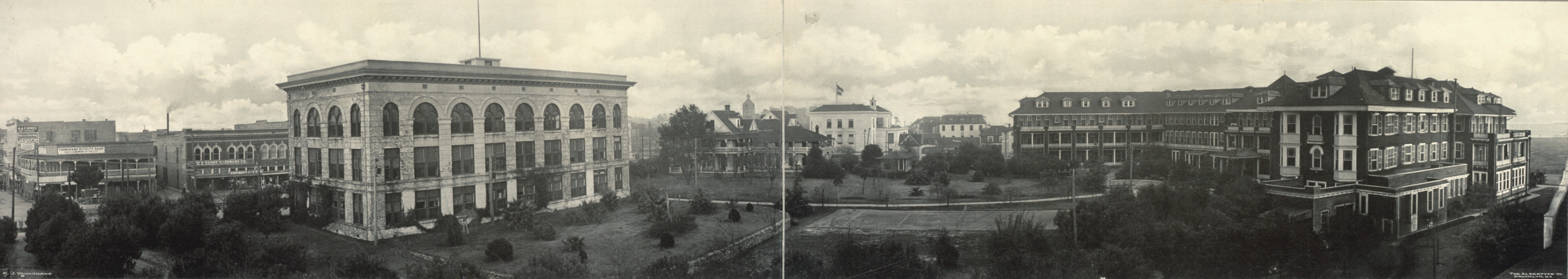
Gulfport Panorama in 1912, showing the Gulf and Ship Island Railroad Building (left) and Great Southern Hotel (right)

He married Melodia E. Blackmarr on October 15, 1876, and they had two children.

Although Jones' family resided in Buffalo, New York, he spent much of his time in south Mississippi overseeing his investments in the railroad, timber, and shipping. He had the Great Southern Hotel constructed in Gulfport to serve as his Gulf Coast residence, and nearby, an office building was constructed for the Gulf and Ship Island Railroad Company.

== Death and legacy ==
By 1910, Jones was living with his wife and children in Buffalo, New York. He developed health problems during the last three years of his life and died on December 6, 1916, at his home in Buffalo. He was interred in the Jones Family Mausoleum at Forest Lawn Cemetery. At the time of his death, his estate was estimated to be worth 15 million dollars.

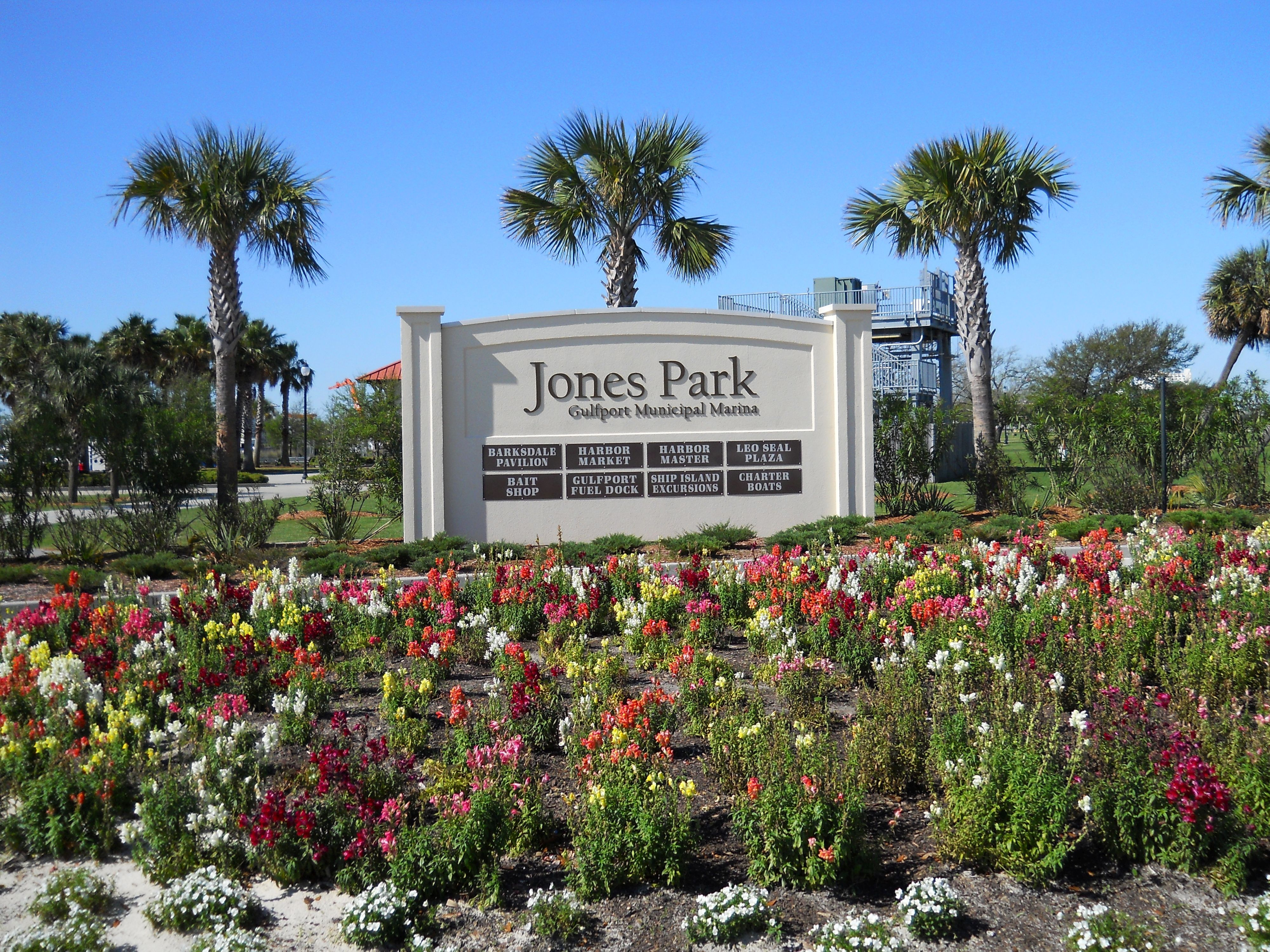
City Park

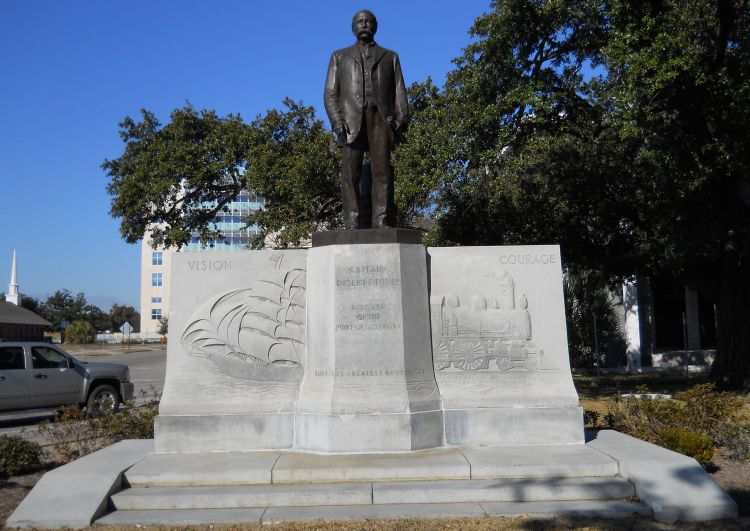
Monument

Joseph T. Jones Legacies

In 1935, Grace Jones Stewart, heir of Joseph T. Jones, donated to the city of Gulfport a tract of land along the shores of the Gulf of Mexico to be used solely for recreational purposes. Despite efforts to develop the land for other objectives, it endures as the Joseph T. Jones Memorial Park.

On January 18, 1942, a life-sized bronze statue, atop a granite monument, was dedicated in Gulfport to "the city's greatest benefactor". The statue faces the harbor that Jones built.
