= William H. Hardy =

American politician

William Harris Hardy
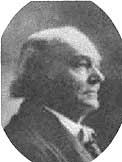
- W.H. Hardy (circa 1900)
- Born: February 12, 1837; Lowndes County, Alabama, U.S.
- Died: February 17, 1917 (aged 80); Gulfport, Mississippi, U.S.
- Education: Cumberland University
- Known for: Founder of Hattiesburg, Laurel, Mississippi, and Gulfport, Mississippi
- Spouse(s): Sallie Ann Johnson (1860-1872); Hattie Lott (1874-1895); Ida V. May (1895-1917)
- Children: 12
- Parent(s): Robert W. Hardy; Temperance L. Toney

William Harris Hardy (February 12, 1837 − February 17, 1917) was an American businessman who founded the Mississippi cities of Hattiesburg, Laurel, and Gulfport.

== Early years ==
Born to Robert W. and Temperance L. (Toney) Hardy in Todds Hill (in Lowndes County, Alabama) on 12 February 1837, William Harris Hardy attended country schools and eventually Cumberland University in Lebanon, Tennessee for three years, withdrawing before graduation due to contraction of pneumonia. Following his convalescence, Hardy agreed to a cousin's proposal to start Sylvarena Academy, a boys' primary school affiliated with the Methodist Church. During his year at Sylvarena in Flowers, Mississippi, Hardy read law, and when he departed the Academy in 1856 for Raleigh, Mississippi, was able to easily pass the Bar. In 1858, he opened his own law practice. In 1859, he met, and in 1860, he married Sallie Ann Johnson, with whom he had six children (Mattie, Willie, Ellen, Elizabeth, Thomas, and Jefferson Davis) before her death in 1872.

== Service and career ==
=== Civil War service ===
In 1861, Hardy raised Company H of the 16th Mississippi Infantry Regiment, of which he was elected Captain. He served with this unit until October 1862, when illness forced his resignation. In April 1864 he was appointed an Aide de Camp by General Argyle Smith, in which capacity he served until the end of the war.

=== New Orleans and Northeastern and Alabama Southern Railroads ===
In 1868, Hardy became involved in a plan to build a railroad from Meridian, Mississippi to New Orleans, Louisiana: the New Orleans and Northeastern Railroad (NO&NERR). He later became General Counsel for the company, although his legacy with that railroad centers on two things in particular: Hardy's engineering work to construct the bridge spanning Lake Pontchartrain and his efforts to secure funding once the road went into receivership during the economic Panic of 1873.

In 1870, Hardy worked sporadically with his brother-in-law and board of directors member, Milton Lott, on the narrow-gauge Alabama Southern Railroad. Hardy's work there ended in much the same way as his involvement in the NO&NERR, he eventually secured partial funding from the British banking house of May before departing the railroad and ending his official involvement in 1873.

Hardy's increasing involvement in the day-to-day operations of the NO&NERR, eventually as that road's General Counsel, necessitated a move to Meridian, Mississippi in 1873. While on a business trip to Mobile he met Hattie Lott, and they married in 1874. Hattie moved to Meridian soon after; she had three children (Lena Mai, Lamar, and Toney) with Hardy before her death in 1895.

=== Gulf and Ship Island Railroad ===
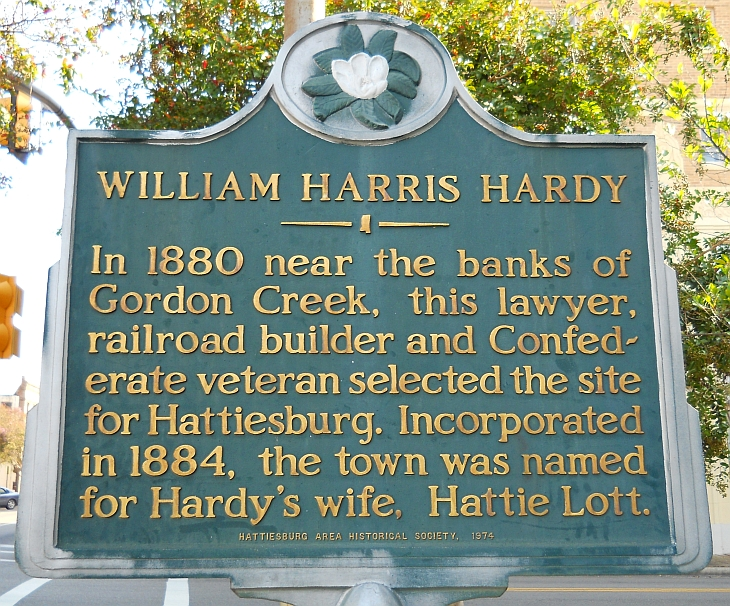

The coup Hardy achieved in overseeing completion of the Pontchartrain Bridge and securing funding to complete the NO&NERR brought a measure of regional fame. Railroad men (and those who wanted to be) throughout Mississippi courted him for their boards of directors. In 1880, Hardy joined longtime railroad financiers and fellow Confederate veterans, William Clark Falkner and William Wirt Adams, to revive and revise the lapsed charter for the narrow gauge Ship Island, Ripley, and Kentucky Railroad.

With Fallkner's support, Hardy accepted the presidency of the Gulf and Ship Island Railroad in 1887, pending revision of that road's line to "some point on the Gulf of Mexico", and its change to standard gauge. An apocryphal tale says that while involved in surveys for the New Orleans and Northeastern Railroad, Hardy came up with the idea of a north-south railroad from the Mississippi Gulf Coast to Jackson, Tennessee. While Hardy did not devise the entire railroad route on his own, he did make several important modifications to the lay of the line by changing the coast terminus and the route to cross his NO&NERR at a point he named "Hattiesburg," in honor of his wife, Hattie. Hardy determined Mississippi City, the county seat, was too far east of the natural deep-water harbor protected by Ship Island and proposed a new city, Gulfport, as the revised terminus.

Throughout his long involvement with the Gulf and Ship Island, Hardy lobbied investors and financiers throughout the north, west, and Europe to bring their capital to his project; eventually, the reality of Reconstruction economics got the best of him. His questionable use of the state's convicts, under the lease of Jones S. Hamilton, brought his first dose of bad press when a state commission, tasked with investigation of the convict lease system, revoked the company's lease in 1888. Also in that year, two of the railroad's most vocal supporters (William Falkner and Jones Hamilton) were involved in politically motivated assassinations. The final blow came with a financial collapse; Hardy's efforts to secure financing could not counter a wholesale panic, and the Gulf and Ship Island went into receivership in 1896.

=== Public service ===
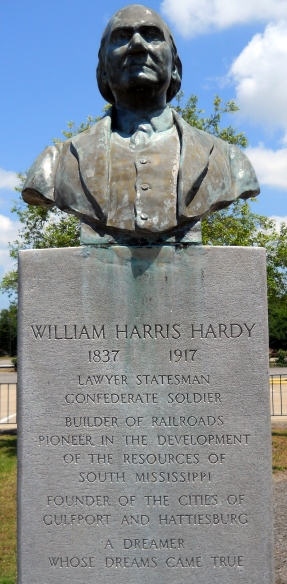
William H. Hardy Monument in Gulfport, Mississippi

Although the Gulf and Ship Island Railroad changed hands to Joseph T. Jones, Hardy remained involved as a board member until 1899. His election to the Mississippi State Legislature in 1895 kept him at the State Capital in Jackson enough to make involvement with the railroad less possible.

While in Jackson, Hardy met and married his third wife, Ida V. May, with whom he had three children, William H. Jr., Hamilton Lee, and James Hutchins. In 1905, Hardy served as circuit court judge for the second district (covering south-central Mississippi). When the district split in 1906, Hardy remained as judge for the newly created coastal district until his semi-retirement in 1909. For the next eight years, Hardy maintained law offices in Gulfport, Mississippi with his son Toney.

Hardy died of a heart attack at his home in Gulfport, Mississippi, on February 17, 1917, five days after his 80th birthday.
