= RESTORE Act =

- Other short titles: Resources and Ecosystems Sustainability, Tourist Opportunities, and Revived Economies of the Gulf Coast States Act
- Acronyms (colloquial): RESTORE Act
- Enacted by: the 112th United States Congress
- Effective: July 6, 2012

Codification
- Acts amended: Moving Ahead for Progress in the 21st Century Act

Legislative history
- Passed the Senate on March 14, 2012; Passed the House and Senate on June 29, 2012; Signed into law by President Barack Obama on July 6, 2012

The RESTORE Act (the Resources and Ecosystems Sustainability, Tourist Opportunities, and Revived Economies of the Gulf Coast States Act) is a United States federal statute that was signed into law by President Barack Obama on July 6, 2012. It was enacted by the 112th United States Congress as an amendment of the Moving Ahead for Progress in the 21st Century Act (MAP-21), a transportation bill that included many other provisions. The act was in response to the Deepwater Horizon oil spill that occurred on April 20, 2010, which caused significant environmental, ecological, and economic damage to the U.S. Gulf Coast.

== Origins ==
On April 20, 2010, the Deepwater Horizon, an oil rig located in the Gulf of Mexico that was owned by Transocean and drilling for British Petroleum (BP) exploded, killing 11 workers and injuring 16. The rig burned for over a day before it sank into the gulf on April 22, 2010. Following the explosion, the seafloor oil gusher flowed for 87 days, spilling an estimated 4.9 million barrels (780,000 m^{3}) of oil into the gulf.

The spill resulted in widespread damage to the environment and ecology of the gulf coast states, as well as subsequent economic damage to their tourism and fishing industries. BP settled with the Department of Justice for a record-high $4.525 billion in fines, however further legal proceedings are ongoing. In September 2014, a U.S. district judge issued a ruling that BP was mostly responsible for the spill, which could result in as much as $18 billion in additional penalties under the Clean Water Act.

== Bill ==
The purpose of the RESTORE Act is to direct the allocation of civil penalties paid after July 6, 2012 under the Clean Water Act. It directs that eighty percent of the money collected will go the Gulf Coast Restoration Trust Fund in the U.S. Treasury Department, a trust fund created under the bill, and that twenty percent will go to the Oil Spill Liability Trust Fund, which is managed by the U.S. Coast Guard and available primarily for oil spill related emergency response efforts.

The eighty percent that will go to the Gulf Coast Restoration Trust Fund will be allocated as follows:

- Thirty-five percent will go to the Direct Component and will be divided equally among the five gulf states for restoration activities.
- Thirty percent will go to the Comprehensive Plan Component and will be directed according to the plan proposed by the Gulf Coast Ecosystem Restoration Council.
- Thirty percent will go to the Spill Impact Component and will be allocated to entities representing the gulf states for restoration activities approved by the Council.
- The remaining five percent will be equally divided between the NOAA RESTORE Act Science Program and the Centers of Excellence Research Grants Program.

== Legislative history ==
On July 21, 2011, Senators Mary Landrieu (D-La.) and Richard Shelby (R-Ala.) introduced the RESTORE Act with support from environmental and business organizations. On March 14, 2012, the Senate passed the RESTORE Act as an amendment to the transportation bill 76-22. On June 29, 2012, both the House and Senate passed the full transportation bill by votes of 373-52 and 74-19, respectively. On July 6, 2012, President Barack Obama signed the transportation bill, including the RESTORE Act, into law.
