= Gulfport–Biloxi International Airport =

Airport in Mississippi, US

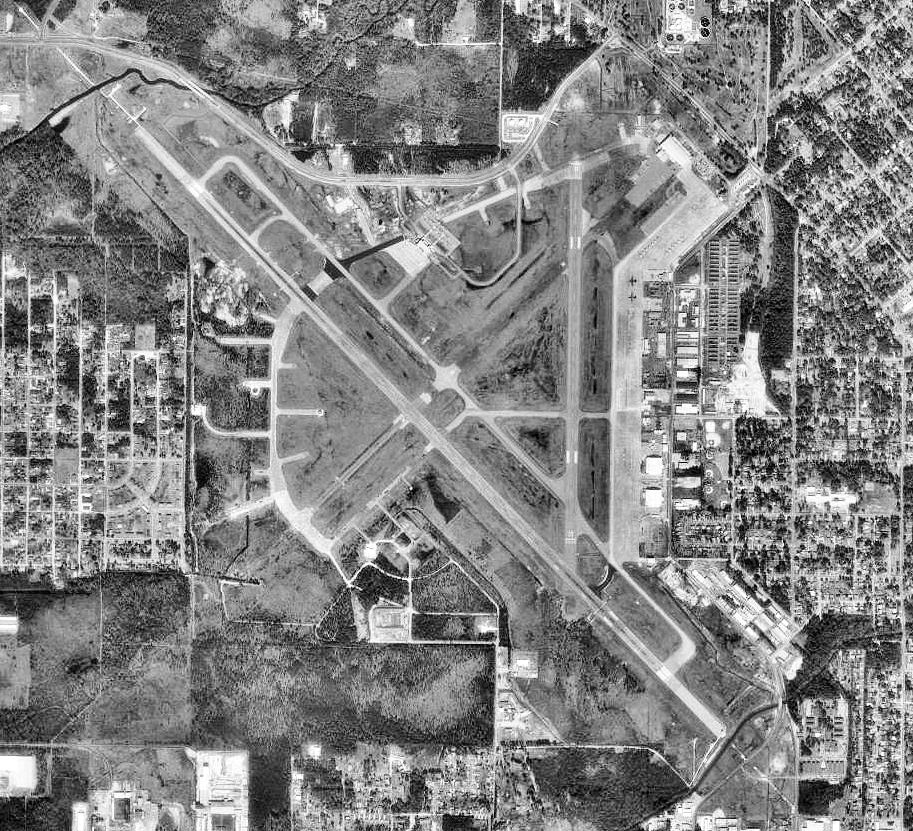
- USGS 1992 orthophoto
- IATA: GPT; ICAO: KGPT; FAA LID: GPT

Summary
- Airport type: Public
- Owner: Gulfport–Biloxi Regional Airport Authority
- Serves: Gulfport–Biloxi metropolitan area
- Location: Gulfport, Mississippi
- Elevation AMSL: 28 ft (8.5 m)
- Coordinates: 30°24′26″N 089°04′12″W
- Website: www.FlyGPT.com

Maps
- FAA airport diagram
- Interactive map of Gulfport–Biloxi International Airport

Runways
Direction	Length		Surface
Direction	ft	m	Surface
14/32	9,002	2,744	Asphalt/concrete
18/36	4,935	1,504	Asphalt

Statistics (2022)
- Passengers: 685,923
- Aircraft operations: 52,044 (2020)
- Based aircraft: 34 (2020)
- Sources: and FAA

Gulfport–Biloxi International Airport (IATA: GPT, ICAO: KGPT, FAA LID: GPT) is a joint civil–military public-use airport three nautical miles (6 km) northeast of the central business district of Gulfport, a city in Harrison County, Mississippi, United States. It is owned by the Gulfport–Biloxi Regional Airport Authority and serves the Gulf Coast area.

This airport is included in the National Plan of Integrated Airport Systems for 2011–2015, which categorized it as a primary commercial service airport (more than 10,000 enplanements per year). As per Federal Aviation Administration records, the airport had 487,907 passenger boardings (enplanements) in calendar year 2008; 411,978 enplanements in 2009; and 325,437 emplacements in 2014. Despite its title, all regularly scheduled commercial passenger flights at the airport are domestic flights only. US Customs is available 24/7 if scheduled. US Customs has a fully functioning customs office to process passengers at Million Air Aviation. The GPT airport has private international and military charter international traffic throughout the year.

== History ==
The airport was originally built in 1942 by the United States Army Air Forces as a training base for Air Corps Flying Training Command. Gulfport Army Airfield opened on July 7, and the Eastern Technical Training Command conducted technical training and basic training unit transferred to Third Air Force on March 31, 1944 with joint use by Technical Training Command for marine training of Emergency Rescue School (3d Air Rescue Group) at Keesler Army Airfield. With the end of the war and the drawdown of the military, Gulfport AAF was placed into reserve status on January 31, 1946.

Gulfport Field was declared excess by the Air Force and conveyed by the War Assets Administration to the City of Gulfport in 1949 for use as a civil airport. The city negotiated airline service contracts with Southern Airways and later National Airlines to provide passenger and cargo service beginning in the early 1950s.

Due to the large expansion of the United States Air Force as a result of the Cold War, a new lease was obtained for military use of the airport, and Gulfport Air Force Base was opened as a joint-use civil–military facility. Gulfport AFB was closed as an active Air Force installation and its military facilities were transferred to the Mississippi Air National Guard, with the airport remaining a joint-use airport and Air National Guard base. Although no military aircraft are permanently assigned, the base serves as the home of the Gulfport Combat Readiness Training Center.

Through the late 1970s, Southern Airways continued as the primary airline, followed by successors Republic Airlines and Northwest Airlines into the 1990s.

== Facilities and aircraft ==
Gulfport–Biloxi International Airport covers an area of 1,400 acres (567 ha) at an elevation of 28 feet (9 m) above mean sea level. It has two runways: 14/32 is 9,002 by 150 feet (2,744 x 46 m) with an asphalt and concrete surface; 18/36 is 4,935 by 150 feet (1,504 x 46 m) with an asphalt surface.

For the 12-month period ending January 31, 2018, the airport had 48,868 aircraft operations, an average of 134 per day: 52% military, 26% general aviation, 8% air taxi, and 14% scheduled commercial. As in 4Q of 2023, there were 41 aircraft based at this airport: 32 single-engine, 4 jet, 2 multi-engine, 3 helicopter, .

=== Cargo facility ===
A 40,000-square-foot (3,700 m^{2}) cargo facility is at Gulfport–Biloxi International Airport. It includes 20,000 square feet (1,900 m^{2}) of chiller space; 20,000 square feet (1,900 m^{2}) of cargo sorting and distribution space; and 6,000 square feet (560 m^{2}) of office space. Airside access from the runway system has been designed with safety and efficiency in mind. The ramp can facilitate two MD11s, DC10s or B747s. The area is also expandable with 120 acres (0.49 km^{2}) reserved for air cargo on airport property.

== Airlines and destinations ==
Airlines	Destinations
American Eagle	Charlotte, Dallas/Fort Worth
Breeze Airways	Las Vegas, Orlando, Tampa
Delta Air Lines	Atlanta
Sun Country Airlines	Seasonal: Minneapolis/St. Paul
United Express	Houston–Intercontinental

Destinations map
Destinations from Gulfport–Biloxi International Airport
Red = Year-round destination
Green = Seasonal destination
Blue = Future destination

== Statistics ==
Busiest Domestic Routes from GPT (May 2025 – April 2026)
Rank	Airport	Passengers	Airline
1	(Georgia (U.S. state)) Atlanta, Georgia	126,930	Delta
2	Dallas-Fort Worth, Texas	63,190	American
3	Charlotte, North Carolina	57,210	American
4	Houston, Texas	49,530	United
5	Las Vegas, Nevada	9,160	Breeze
6	Orlando–International, Florida	8,170	Breeze
7	Tampa, Florida	7,650	Breeze
8	Minneapolis/Saint Paul, Minnesota	1,600	Sun Country

Airline Market Shares (May 2025 – April 2026)
Rank	Airline	Passengers	Market Share
1	Delta	246,000	38.08%
2	PSA	122,000	18.93%
3	Commute	98,570	15.25%
4	Envoy	90,120	13.94%
5	Breeze	55,090	8.52%
-	Other	34,140	5.28%

== Hurricane Katrina ==
The airport was closed for repairs following severe damage by Hurricane Katrina on August 29, 2005. On August 30, 2005, the airfield reopened to first responder flights, and on September 8 it reopened for commercial flights. The airport underwent an extensive renovation that was completed in 2007.

== See also ==
- List of airports in Mississippi
