= Rushlight (disambiguation) =

A rushlight is a type of candle or miniature torch made from the dried pith of the rush plant.

Rushlight(s) may also refer to:

- Rushlights (film), directed by Antoni Stutz (2013)
- Allen G. Rushlight (1874 – 1930), American politician and businessman
- Rushlight, student literary magazine at Wheaton College in Massachusetts
- Rushlight: The Belfast Magazine, founded by writer Joe Graham in 1972
