= National Register of Historic Places listings in Harrison County, Mississippi =

Location of Harrison County in Mississippi

This is a list of the National Register of Historic Places listings in Harrison County, Mississippi.

This is intended to be a complete list of the properties and districts on the National Register of Historic Places in Harrison County, Mississippi, United States. Latitude and longitude coordinates are provided for many National Register properties and districts; these locations may be seen together in a map.

There are 55 properties and districts listed on the National Register in the county, including 1 National Historic Landmark. Another 14 properties were once listed but have been removed.

This National Park Service list is complete through NPS recent listings posted October 23, 2026.

== Current listings ==
| | Name on the Register | Image | Date listed | Location | City or town | Description |
|---|---|---|---|---|---|---|
| 1 | E. Barq Pop Factory | E. Barq Pop Factory | May 18, 1984 (#84002164) | 140 Keller Avenue; 30°23′45″N 88°52′41″W | Biloxi | Barq's root beer was created by Edward C. Barq in 1898 and was produced on this site until 1936. |
| 2 | Raymond Bass Site (22HR636) | Raymond Bass Site (22HR636) | February 26, 1987 (#87000230) | Address restricted | Biloxi | Domestic camp site, 1499-1000 AD |
| 3 | Beauvoir | Beauvoir | September 3, 1971 (#71000448) | 200 West Beach Boulevard; 30°23′40″N 88°58′12″W | Biloxi | Post-war home of Confederate President Jefferson Davis. Badly damaged by Hurricane Katrina, but restored. |
| 4 | Thomas and Melinda Benton House | Thomas and Melinda Benton House | August 9, 2002 (#02000857) | 14115 Rippy Road; 30°25′28″N 89°04′22″W | Gulfport | Constructed circa 1870, private ownership |
| 5 | Biloxi Downtown Historic District | Biloxi Downtown Historic District | September 3, 1998 (#98001139) | Roughly along Howard Avenue, from Reynoir Street to Lameuse Street; also Roughly bounded by Rue Magnolia, Howard Ave., Main & Water Sts. 30°23′47″N 88°53′19″W | Biloxi | View northwest from intersection of Howard Avenue and Lameuse Street, Biloxi; second set of address represents a boundary increase 2015-01-13 |
| 6 | Biloxi Garden Center | Biloxi Garden Center | January 18, 1973 (#73001011) | 410 East Bayview Avenue; 30°24′43″N 88°52′58″W | Biloxi | Also known as Old Brick House. Badly damaged by Hurricane Katrina, but restored and rededicated in 2011. Now used as a museum and venue for community events. |
| 7 | Biloxi Lighthouse | Biloxi Lighthouse | October 3, 1973 (#73001012) | On U.S. Route 90 at Porter Avenue; 30°23′39″N 88°54′04″W | Biloxi | Badly damaged by Hurricane Katrina but fully restored and reopened in 2010. |
| 8 | Biloxi Veterans Administration Medical Center | Biloxi Veterans Administration Medical Center | February 14, 2002 (#02000045) | 400 Veterans Avenue; 30°24′56″N 88°56′35″W | Biloxi | Constructed 1932-33 |
| 9 | Bond-Grant House | Bond-Grant House | May 18, 1984 (#84002169) | 932 West Howard Avenue; 30°23′51″N 88°53′39″W | Biloxi | Serves as Biloxi Visitor Center |
| 10 | Broadmoor Place Historic District | | September 28, 2015 (#15000665) | Roughly bounded by Pine & Cypress Aves., 25th & 22nd Sts. 30°22′45″N 89°04′16″W | Gulfport | |
| 11 | Brunet-Fourchy House | Brunet-Fourchy House | May 18, 1984 (#84002173) | 138 Magnolia Street Mall; 30°23′39″N 88°53′18″W | Biloxi | Constructed circa 1835, adapted as restaurant 1964 |
| 12 | Central Gulfport Historic District | | January 19, 2016 (#15000986) | Roughly bounded by 24th & 17th Sts., 18th & 23rd Aves. 30°22′32″N 89°05′15″W | Gulfport | |
| 13 | Clemens House | Clemens House | May 18, 1984 (#84002180) | 764 Water Street; 30°23′42″N 88°53′16″W | Biloxi | Constructed as residence circa 1850. Commercial business location 2011. |
| 14 | Cuevas Rural Historic District | Cuevas Rural Historic District | November 10, 2010 (#10000902) | Menge Avenue running north-south between Red Creek Road and Fahrion Drive; 30°21′20″N 89°13′03″W | Pass Christian | Constructed in 1917, the Pineville Presbyterian Church is part of the Cuevas Rural Historic District |
| 15 | G.B. Dantzler House | G.B. Dantzler House | December 1, 1989 (#89002051) | 1238 East Beach Boulevard; 30°22′19″N 89°04′24″W | Gulfport | Constructed 1924 in Spanish architectural style, private residence |
| 16 | East Howard Avenue Historic District | | May 29, 2015 (#15000297) | Roughly bounded by Dukate, Nixon, Jefferson & Holley Sts., Peyton Dr. & Comfort Pl. 30°23′47″N 88°52′47″W | Biloxi | |
| 17 | Fort Massachusetts | Fort Massachusetts | June 21, 1971 (#71000067) | South of Gulfport on Ship Island, in Gulf Islands National Seashore; 30°12′36″N 88°58′23″W | Gulfport | Constructed 1859-1866 for national defense. Gulf Islands National Seashore tourist attraction. |
| 18 | French Warehouse Site | French Warehouse Site | December 13, 1991 (#91001768) | Gulf Islands National Seashore; 30°14′11″N 88°53′23″W | Ocean Springs | Remnants of warehouse complex established on Ship Island circa 1717. |
| 19 | Greater Biloxi Subdivision | | September 18, 2025 (#100012236) | Roughly bounded by Greater Avenue, Althea Street, Southern Avenue, and Orchid Street; 30°23′47″N 88°57′22″W | Biloxi | |
| 20 | Gulf Coast Center for the Arts | Gulf Coast Center for the Arts | May 8, 1984 (#84002187) | 124 Lameuse Street; 30°23′40″N 88°53′13″W | Biloxi | Also known as old Biloxi Public Library. |
| 21 | Gulf Gardens Historic District | | September 9, 2016 (#16000615) | Roughly bounded by 34th Ave., Terrace Dr., 18th & 15th Sts. 30°22′16″N 89°06′18″W | Gulfport | |
| 22 | Gulfport Army Air Field Hangar | Gulfport Army Air Field Hangar | March 21, 2011 (#11000111) | 4455 Hewes Avenue; 30°24′18″N 89°03′47″W | Gulfport | Built in 1944-45, the hangar was used to train combat crews to operate the B-29 Superfortress. From 1947-63, it was the passenger terminal for the Gulfport Municipal Airport. |
| 23 | Gulfport Harbor Square Commercial Historic District | Gulfport Harbor Square Commercial Historic District | October 25, 2011 (#11000762) | Roughly between 23rd & 28th Aves., 13th St. & 25th Ave. to junction with 17th St. 30°22′10″N 89°05′34″W | Gulfport | Historic commercial area for the City of Gulfport |
| 24 | Gulfport-Harrison County Public Library | Gulfport-Harrison County Public Library | September 22, 2020 (#100005619) | 400 15th St. 30°22′06″N 89°05′15″W | Gulfport | |
| 25 | Gulfport Veterans Administration Medical Center Historic District | Gulfport Veterans Administration Medical Center Historic District | January 15, 2014 (#13001080) | 200 Beach Blvd. 30°22′41″N 89°03′09″W | Gulfport | Constructed 1920-1950; served as Veterans Administration Medical Center until Hurricane Katrina resulted in its closure in 2005 |
| 26 | Gunston Hall | Gunston Hall | September 9, 2014 (#14000564) | 1694 Beach Blvd. 30°23′38″N 88°56′18″W | Biloxi | Completed in 1905 as a home. Became White Pillars Restaurant, 1970-89. |
| 27 | Hewes Building | Hewes Building | October 7, 1982 (#82000575) | 2505 14th Street; 30°22′04″N 89°05′36″W | Gulfport | Constructed 1903-04 in Italian Renaissance architectural style. Commercial business location. |
| 28 | Queen Anne House (Biloxi, Mississippi) | Queen Anne House (Biloxi, Mississippi) | July 17, 1986 (#86001673) | 638 East Howard Avenue; 30°23′46″N 88°53′00″W | Biloxi | Constructed as residence circa 1900. Commercial business location 2011. |
| 29 | JOSEPHINE (Shipwreck) | JOSEPHINE (Shipwreck) | November 22, 2000 (#00001402) | Address restricted | Biloxi | A sidewheel steamer built in 1867, foundered in a storm in 1881. |
| 30 | Lameuse Street Historic District | | June 1, 2015 (#15000301) | Roughly 200-300 blocks Lameuse St., 300 block Haise St. and 300 block of Main St. 30°24′11″N 88°53′14″W | Biloxi | |
| 31 | Magnolia Hotel | Magnolia Hotel | March 14, 1973 (#73001013) | 137 Rue Magnolia; 30°23′41″N 88°53′21″W | Biloxi | Constructed in 1847, now a museum |
| 32 | Dr. Gilbert R. Mason Sr. Medical Office | Dr. Gilbert R. Mason Sr. Medical Office | September 28, 2017 (#100001679) | 670 Division St. 30°24′12″N 88°53′04″W | Biloxi | |
| 33 | Nativity BVM Cathedral | Nativity BVM Cathedral | May 18, 1984 (#84002193) | 870 West Howard Avenue; 30°23′49″N 88°53′28″W | Biloxi | Cathedral of the Nativity of the Blessed Virgin Mary (Catholic), constructed in 1902 |
| 34 | Peoples Bank of Biloxi | Peoples Bank of Biloxi | May 18, 1984 (#84002195) | 152 Lameuse Street; 30°23′46″N 88°53′13″W | Biloxi | Constructed in 1914 |
| 35 | W.J. Quarles House and Cottage | W.J. Quarles House and Cottage | October 16, 1980 (#80002244) | 181 East Old Pass Road; 30°21′09″N 89°09′07″W | Long Beach | Constructed circa 1892. Quarles House was moved from original location, undergoing restoration 2013. |
| 36 | J.W. Randolph School | J.W. Randolph School | February 19, 2025 (#100010472) | 315 Clark Avenue; 30°19′07″N 89°15′00″W | Pass Christian | |
| 37 | Redding House | Redding House | May 18, 1984 (#84002197) | 770 Jackson Street; 30°23′44″N 88°53′16″W | Biloxi | Constructed in 1908, serves as venue for receptions and public gatherings |
| 38 | Reynoir Street Historic District | | January 13, 2015 (#14001153) | 200 blk. Reynoir St. 30°24′03″N 88°53′25″W | Biloxi | |
| 39 | Saenger Theater | Saenger Theater | May 18, 1984 (#84002200) | 170 Reynoir Street; 30°23′50″N 88°53′24″W | Biloxi | Constructed 1928-28, serves as venue for performing arts |
| 40 | St. Matthew Evangelical Lutheran Church | St. Matthew Evangelical Lutheran Church | May 27, 2021 (#100006590) | 1301 31st Ave. 30°22′03″N 89°05′56″W | Gulfport | |
| 41 | Scenic Drive Historic District | Scenic Drive Historic District | May 7, 1979 (#79001309) | Scenic Drive; 30°19′04″N 89°14′28″W | Pass Christian | Out of 135 historic properties along Pass Christian's Scenic Drive Historic District, 70 were destroyed by, or subsequently demolished because of Hurricane Katrina. |
| 42 | Scherer House | Scherer House | May 18, 1984 (#84002201) | 782 Water StreetJ.W. Randolph School, 315 Clark Avenue, Pass Christian, RS100010472, LISTED, 2/19/2025; 30°23′41″N 88°53′18″W | Biloxi | Also known as Spanish House. Constructed circa 1846, used as commercial business in 2011 |
| 43 | Seashore Campground School | Seashore Campground School | May 18, 1984 (#84002204) | 1410 Leggett Drive; 30°23′44″N 88°55′12″W | Biloxi | Church School constructed ca. 1910 |
| 44 | Second Street Historic District | | January 19, 2016 (#15000987) | Along 2nd St. 30°21′04″N 89°08′44″W | Gulfport | |
| 45 | Soria City Historic District | | September 28, 2015 (#15000666) | Roughly bounded by 17th & Bullis Aves., 21st, 22nd & 20th Sts. 30°22′35″N 89°04′43″W | Gulfport | |
| 46 | Southwest Gulfport Historic District | | May 16, 2016 (#16000281) | Bounded by Railroad, 15th, 11th, 9th & Central Sts., 32nd, 36th, 37th, 42nd, 43rd & 34th Aves. 30°21′52″N 89°06′30″W | Gulfport | |
| 47 | Suter House | Suter House | May 18, 1984 (#84002205) | 1012 Tullier Court; 30°23′50″N 88°53′56″W | Biloxi | Constructed circa 1885, private residence |
| 48 | Glenn Swetman House | Glenn Swetman House | May 18, 1984 (#84002206) | 1596 Glenn Swetman Street; 30°23′43″N 88°55′57″W | Biloxi | Constructed in 1926, private residence |
| 49 | Turkey Creek Community Historic District | Turkey Creek Community Historic District | March 21, 2007 (#07000173) | Rippy Road and environs 30°25′25″N 89°04′37″W | Gulfport | Turkey Creek Community is an African American settlement dating from circa 1870. |
| 50 | U.S. Post Office, Courthouse, and Customhouse | U.S. Post Office, Courthouse, and Customhouse | January 30, 1978 (#78001600) | 140 Lameuse Street; 30°23′43″N 88°53′13″W | Biloxi | Also known as Biloxi City Hall. Constructed 1905-08 in Neoclassical Architectural Style. Location of Biloxi City Hall. |
| 51 | US Post Office and Customhouse | US Post Office and Customhouse | March 19, 1984 (#84002209) | 2421 13th Street; 30°22′00″N 89°05′33″W | Gulfport | Building offered for sale in 2010 |
| 52 | Upper West Central Historic District | | May 29, 2015 (#15000302) | Roughly bounded by Hopkins Blvd., CSXRR, Iroquois, Esposito & Division Sts. 30°24′01″N 88°53′48″W | Biloxi | Boundary alterations (increases and decreases) listed on June 4, 2015 |
| 53 | H.S. and Mattie M. Walker House | H.S. and Mattie M. Walker House | September 10, 2014 (#14000565) | 1114 32nd Ave. 30°21′56″N 89°06′01″W | Gulfport | |
| 54 | West Beach Historic District | West Beach Historic District | May 18, 1984 (#84002210) | Roughly U.S. Route 90 between Rosell and Chalmers Avenue; 30°23′46″N 88°54′38″W | Biloxi | View is within Old Biloxi Cemetery |
| 55 | West Central Historic District | West Central Historic District | May 18, 1984 (#84002212) | Roughly bounded by U.S. Route 90, Hopkins Boulevard, and Howard and Benachi Avenues; 30°23′45″N 88°53′53″W | Biloxi | Historic structure (house) at intersection of Seal Avenue and West Howard Avenue |

== Former listings ==
| | Name on the Register | Image | Date listed | Date removed | Location | City or town | Description |
|---|---|---|---|---|---|---|---|
| 1 | Bailey House | | May 18, 1984 (#84002160) | November 5, 2008 | 1333 East Beach Boulevard; 30°23′41″N 88°54′58″W | Biloxi | Constructed circa 1850. Destroyed by Hurricane Katrina August 29, 2005. |
| 2 | Biloxi's Tivoli Hotel | Biloxi's Tivoli Hotel | May 18, 1984 (#84002167) | November 5, 2008 | 420 Beach Boulevard; 30°23′38″N 88°52′26″W | Biloxi | Constructed circa 1926, demolished May 2006 after damage by Hurricane Katrina. |
| 3 | Brielmaier House | | May 18, 1984 (#84002170) | July 16, 2008 | 710 Beach Boulevard; 30°23′36″N 88°53′10″W | Biloxi | Constructed circa 1895. Was delisted in 1986 after the house was moved from its original location, and was readded to the Register in 1995. Destroyed by Hurricane Katrina August 29, 2005. |
| 4 | Church of the Redeemer | Church of the Redeemer | May 18, 1984 (#84002177) | November 5, 2008 | Bellman Street; 30°23′48″N 88°52′54″W | Biloxi | Constructed circa 1874. Heavily damaged by Hurricane Camille on August 17, 1969 but rebuilt. Destroyed by Hurricane Katrina August 29, 2005 and demolished. The Hurricane Camille Memorial that was dedicated on October 2, 2007 remains on the site. |
| 5 | Fisherman's Cottage | | March 9, 1990 (#84002182) | July 16, 2008 | 138 Lameuse Street | Biloxi | Destroyed by Hurricane Katrina August 29, 2005. |
| 6 | Gillis House | Gillis House | May 17, 1973 (#78001599) | July 16, 2008 | 513 East Beach Boulevard | Biloxi | Originally Listed in 1973. Removed from register in 1977, restored in 1978. Destroyed by Hurricane Katrina August 29, 2005. |
| 7 | Harbor Square Historic District | Harbor Square Historic District | August 13, 1985 (#85001788) | October 25, 2011 | Roughly bounded by the former Louisville and Nashville railroad line, 23rd Avenue, 13th Street and 27th Avenue; 30°22′05″N 89°05′35″W | Gulfport | Listing replaced by Gulfport Harbor Square Commercial Historic District |
| 8 | Hermann House | Hermann House | May 18, 1984 (#84002189) | November 5, 2008 | 523 East Beach Boulevard; 30°23′35″N 88°52′23″W | Biloxi | Constructed circa 1850. Destroyed by Hurricane Katrina August 29, 2005. |
| 9 | Finley B. Hewes House | | August 15, 2002 (#78001599) | July 16, 2008 | 604 East Beach Boulevard | Gulfport | Destroyed by Hurricane Katrina August 29, 2005. |
| 10 | House at 771 Water Street | | May 18, 1984 (#84002191) | July 16, 2008 | 771 Water Street | Biloxi | Destroyed by Hurricane Katrina August 29, 2005. |
| 11 | MARGARET EMILIE | | April 13, 1973 (#73001010) | May 30, 1989 | 1036 Fred Haise Blvd. | Biloxi | Destroyed in 1988 |
| 12 | Milner House | Milner House | July 31, 1972 (#72000692) | July 16, 2008 | 720 East Beach Boulevard; 30°22′32″N 89°03′48″W | Gulfport | Known as Grass Lawn. Destroyed by Hurricane Katrina August 29, 2005. |
| 13 | Pleasant Reed House | Pleasant Reed House | January 11, 1979 (#79001308) | July 16, 2008 | 928 Elmer Street | Biloxi | Destroyed by Hurricane Katrina August 29, 2005. |
| 14 | Toledano-Philbrick-Tullis House | Toledano-Philbrick-Tullis House | November 5, 1976 (#76001095) | July 16, 2008 | 360 East Beach Boulevard; 30°23′35″N 88°52′18″W | Biloxi | Destroyed by Hurricane Katrina August 29, 2005. |

== See also ==
- List of National Historic Landmarks in Mississippi
- National Register of Historic Places listings in Mississippi
