= Altaev =

Altaev is a surname. Notable people with the surname include:

- Al Altaev (1872–1959), Soviet children's book author
- Nūrjan Ältaev (born 1978), Kazakh politician
