= Luchina =

Lighting made of a wooden splinter

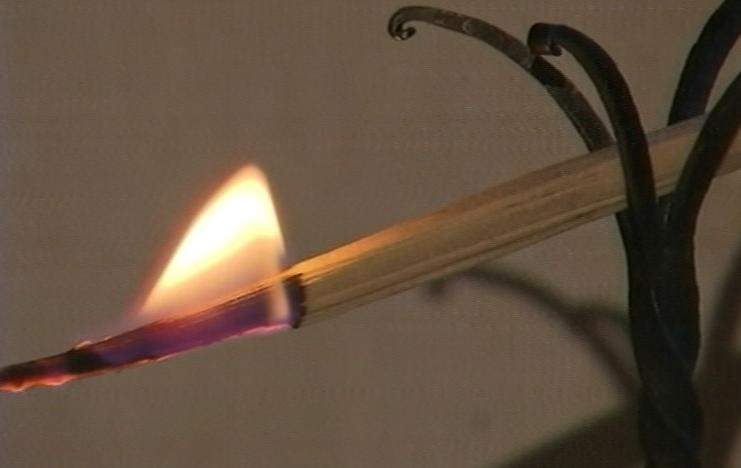
Burning luchina

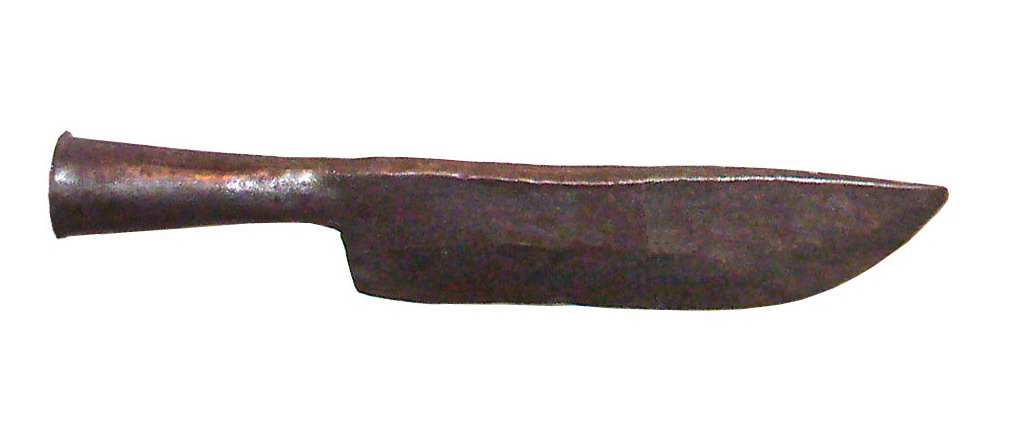
A knife for splintering luchinas

A luchina (Russian: Лучина) is a long thin sliver/chip or plate of wood, most commonly used as a miniature torch for makeshift lighting of the interiors of buildings in the history of Russia. Similar implements were used in other countries, e.g., Poland (called pl:Łuczywo), Ukraine (called uk:Скіпка or Лучина).

== Luchina lights ==
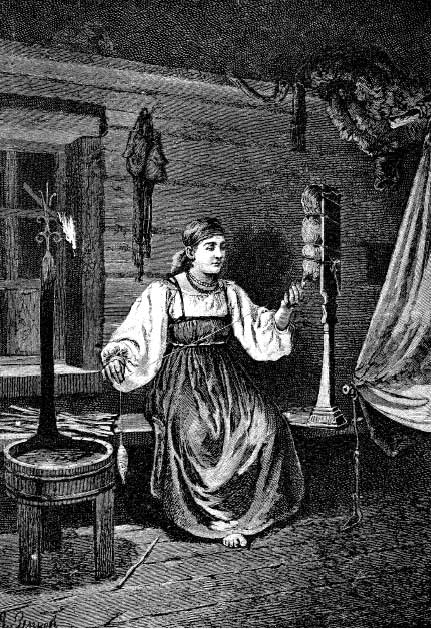
Spinning under luchina

An early mention of the use of luchina for lighting in western sources may be found in Fletcter's Of the Russe Common Wealth (1591):

...their greater menne vſe much waxe for their lightes, poorer and meaner ſorte birch dried in their ſtoaues, and cut into long ſliuers, which they call Luchineos.

Luchinas are best used from luchina cuts of log; it was steam-heated in a Russian stove for easy splintering. Splintering was done with the help of a special large knife called a luchinnik or kosar. It may also be done with a special implement, similar to a carpenter's plane.

For lighting, luchina is inserted in a crack in the wooden wall or in a special holder called svetets. A small metal svetets may be stuck in a wooden wall. A more elaborate svetets may be manufactured with a stand. A small basin with water is usually placed under the svetets, to collect ashes and coals.

In Poland, luczywo, known under various regional names, could also be placed in a special cavity in the stove or on a special hearth attached to the stove, or in hanging holders.

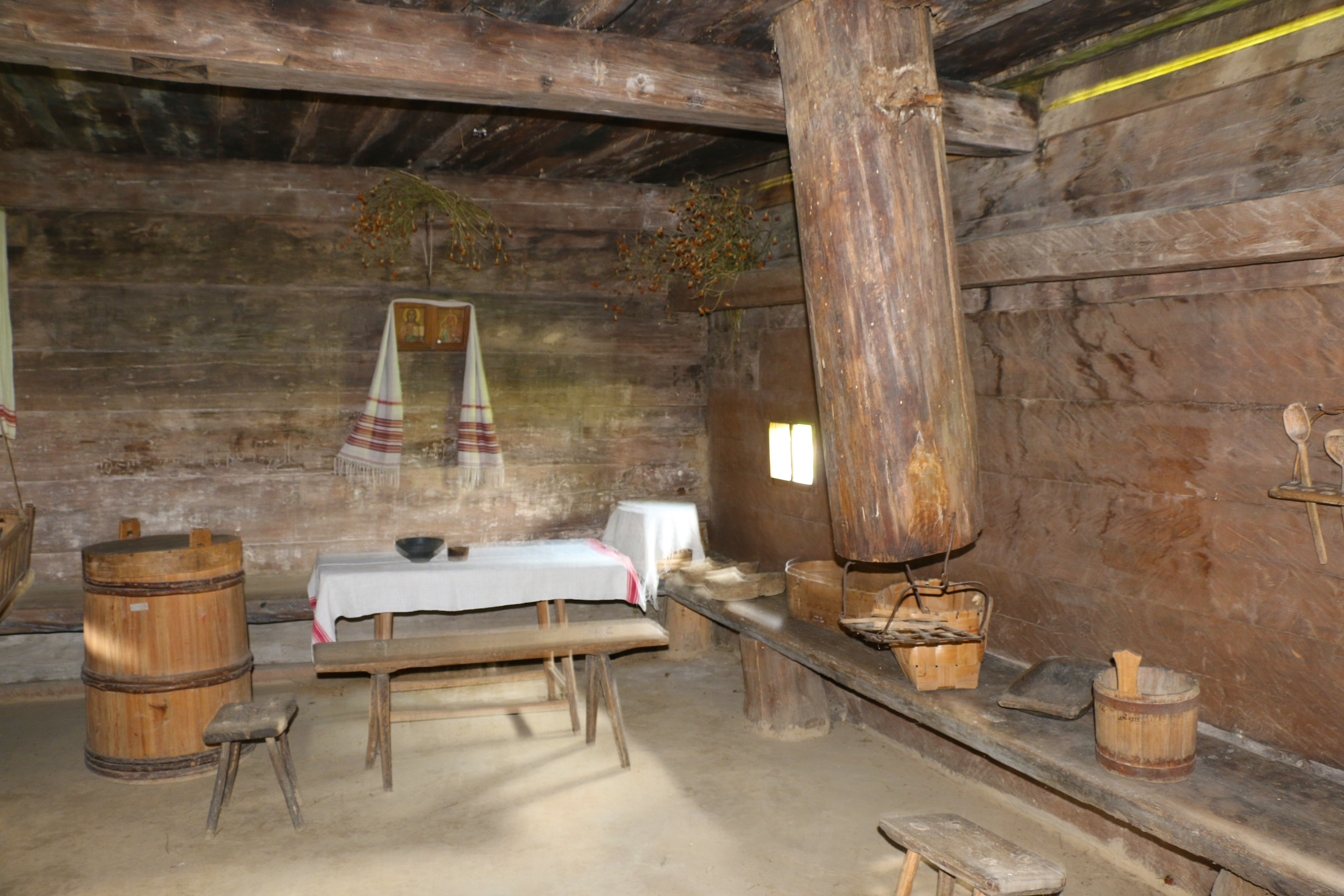
Svitach

In Polesian huts luchinas were burned using svitach (Світач, Polish:Świtacz), an implement that consisted of wooden pipe leading through the roof, under which an iron grate was hanging, on which luchinas were burned.

A part of servicing of luchina/luczywo, usually done by children, was to remove the charred tips, for brighter light.

Usage of luchina/luczywo had a number of drawbacks enumerated in an 1828 article by a colonel Piotr Kołogriwow, which suggested to use burning of hemp stalks for lighting. He identified the following issues:

- Waste of big amounts of good wood (because bad wood (crooked or knotty) is not used for luchinas), because in winter nearly all dark time is used by peasants for various chores and winter works.
- Fires, due to carelessness
- Time spent for preparation of wood for luchina
- Injuries during luchina splintering
- Smoke in the house is bad for eyes and breathing.

Kołogriwow argues all the above drawbacks are absent if hemp were to be used.

Russian archeologists posed a question when luchinas were started to be used for lighting in Russia. Possible indicators would have been finding of luchina holders (svetets), but this indicator is unreliable for the determination of the earliest date, because luchinas can be simply inserted into a crack of a wall. Another way is search for lucina's unburned tinder ends (and having a reliable way to distinguish them from other kinds of partially burned pieces of wood). Archeologists of Novgorod sought for luchina ends in various strata and found no remnants of those in strata dated between the 11th and first half of 13th centuries.

== Other uses of luchina ==
Luchanas were commonly used as kindling to start a fire and for making laths for lath and plaster works.

In Olonets Governorate (Karelia), pine luchina was commonly used for basket weaving, both for home usage and for sale.

== In culture ==
- Luchina, poem by Marina Tsvetaeva
- Luchina is an alternative name for the Russian song То не ветер ветку клонит
- Luchinushka ("darling Luchina") is the title of several songs and poems, see s:ru:Лучина

== See also ==
- Rushlight, a similar lighting implement by soaking the dried pith of the rush plant in fat or grease.
- Fatwood
- de:Maulaffe, German fatwood lighter holder
- List of light sources
