= Redding House =

Historic house in Mississippi, United States

- U.S. National Register of Historic Places
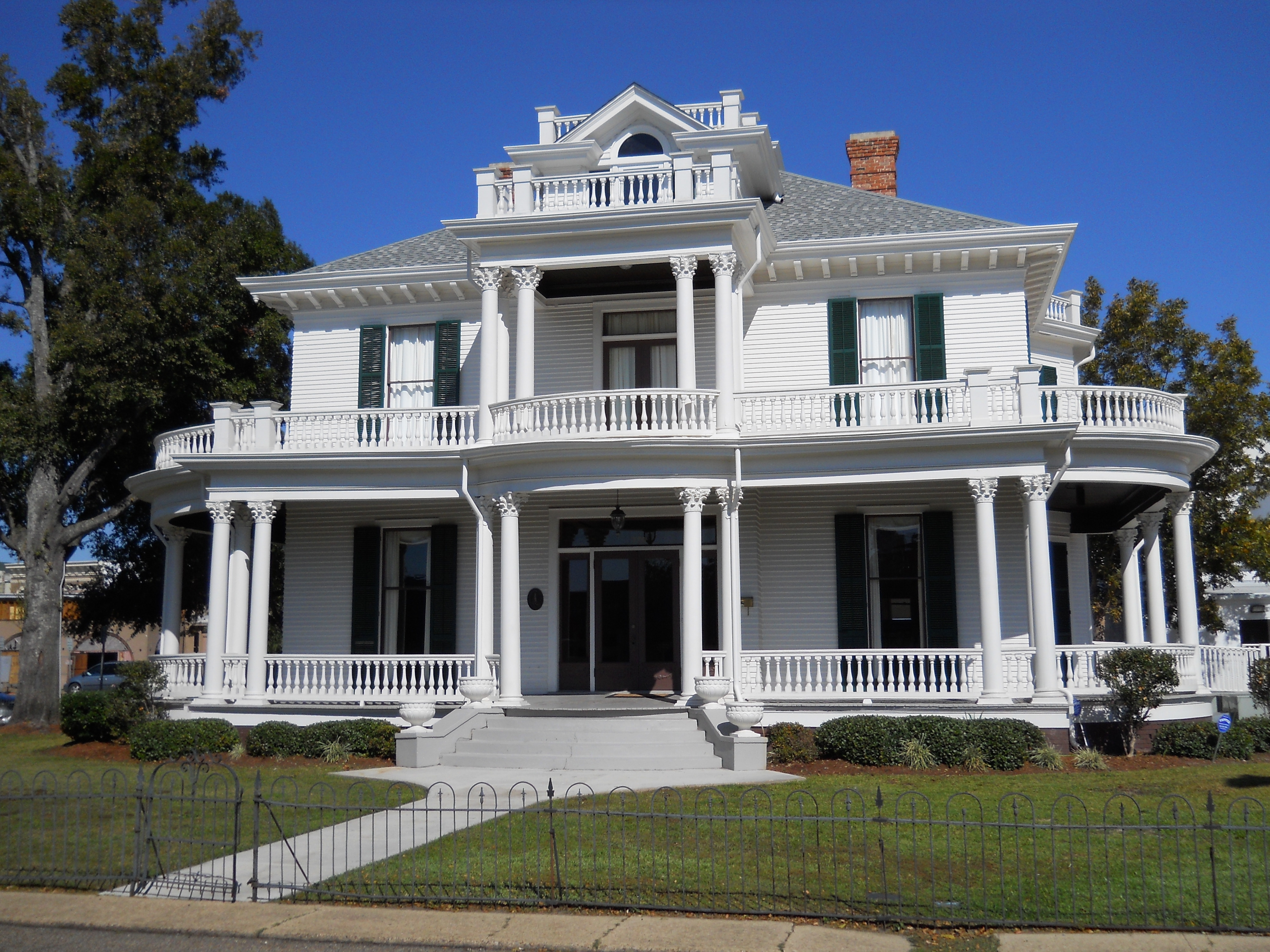
- The Redding House in 2011

- Location within Mississippi Location within the United States
- Location: 126 West Jackson Street, Biloxi, Mississippi
- Coordinates: 30°23′44″N 88°53′16″W
- Area: less than one acre
- Built: 1908
- Architectural style: Classical Revival
- MPS: Biloxi MRA
- NRHP reference No.: 84002197
- Added to NRHP: May 18, 1984

Redding House is a historic house in Biloxi, Mississippi, U.S.. It was built in 1908 for Charles Redding, a local businessman. It was designed in the Classical Revival architectural style. It has been listed on the National Register of Historic Places since May 18, 1984.
