= Old Brick House (Biloxi, Mississippi) =

Historic house in Mississippi, United States

- U.S. National Register of Historic Places
- Mississippi Landmark
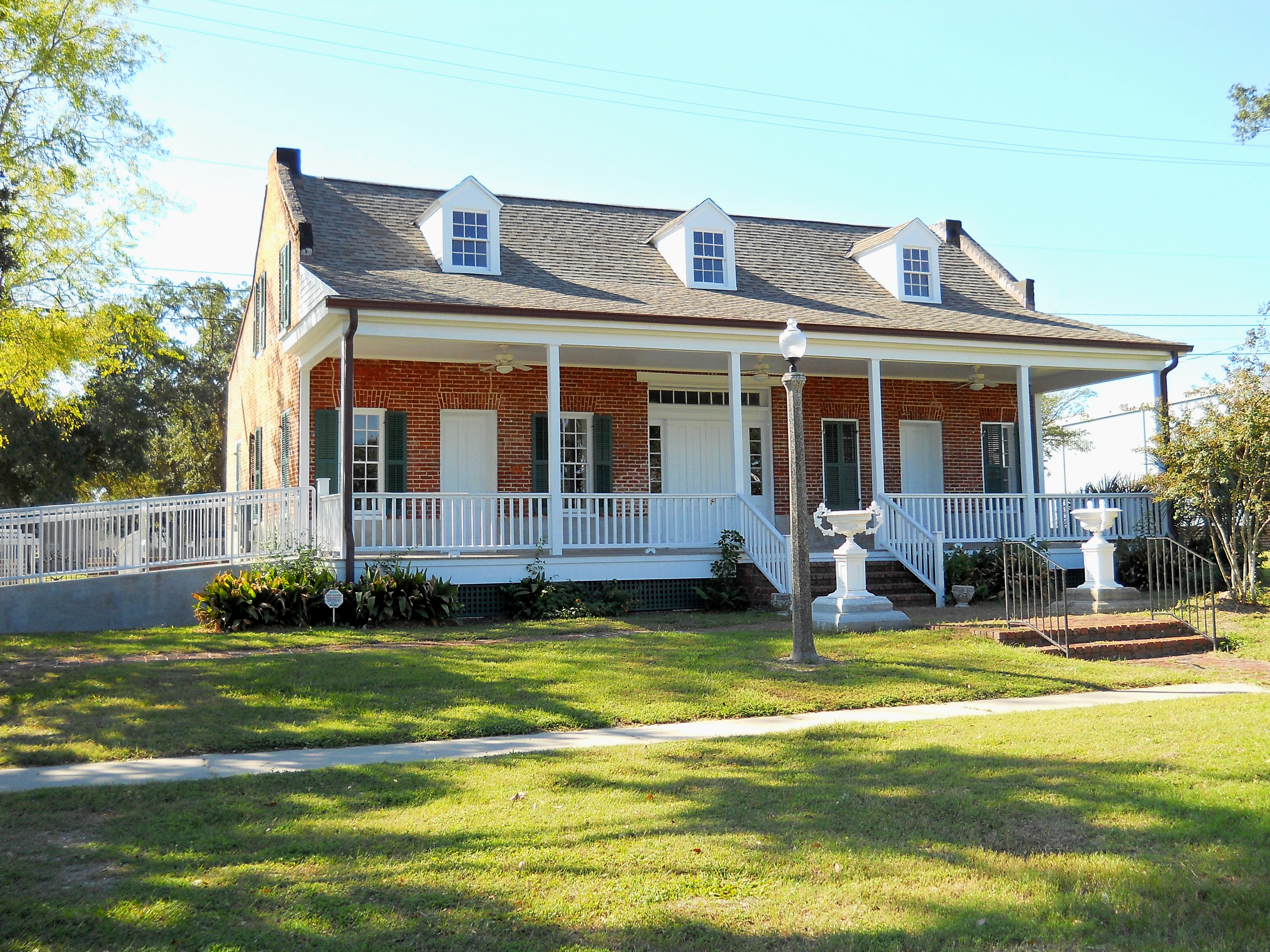
- Old Brick House, October 2011

- Location within Mississippi Location within the United States
- Location: 410 E. Bayview Avenue; Biloxi, Mississippi
- Coordinates: 30°24′42.53″N 88°52′57.79″W
- Built: circa 1850
- Architectural style: French Colonial
- NRHP reference No.: 73001011
- USMS No.: 047-BLX-0010-NR-ML

Significant dates
- Added to NRHP: 1973
- Designated USMS: January 8, 1987

The Old Brick House, also known as Biloxi Garden Center, was built around 1850 as a modest family home by John Henley, a former sheriff and mayor of Biloxi. The house is situated on Back Bay in Biloxi, Mississippi. The home was added to the National Register of Historic Places in 1973, and was designated a Mississippi Landmark in 1987. Although heavily damaged by Hurricane Katrina in 2005, the house was restored and re-dedicated in 2011.

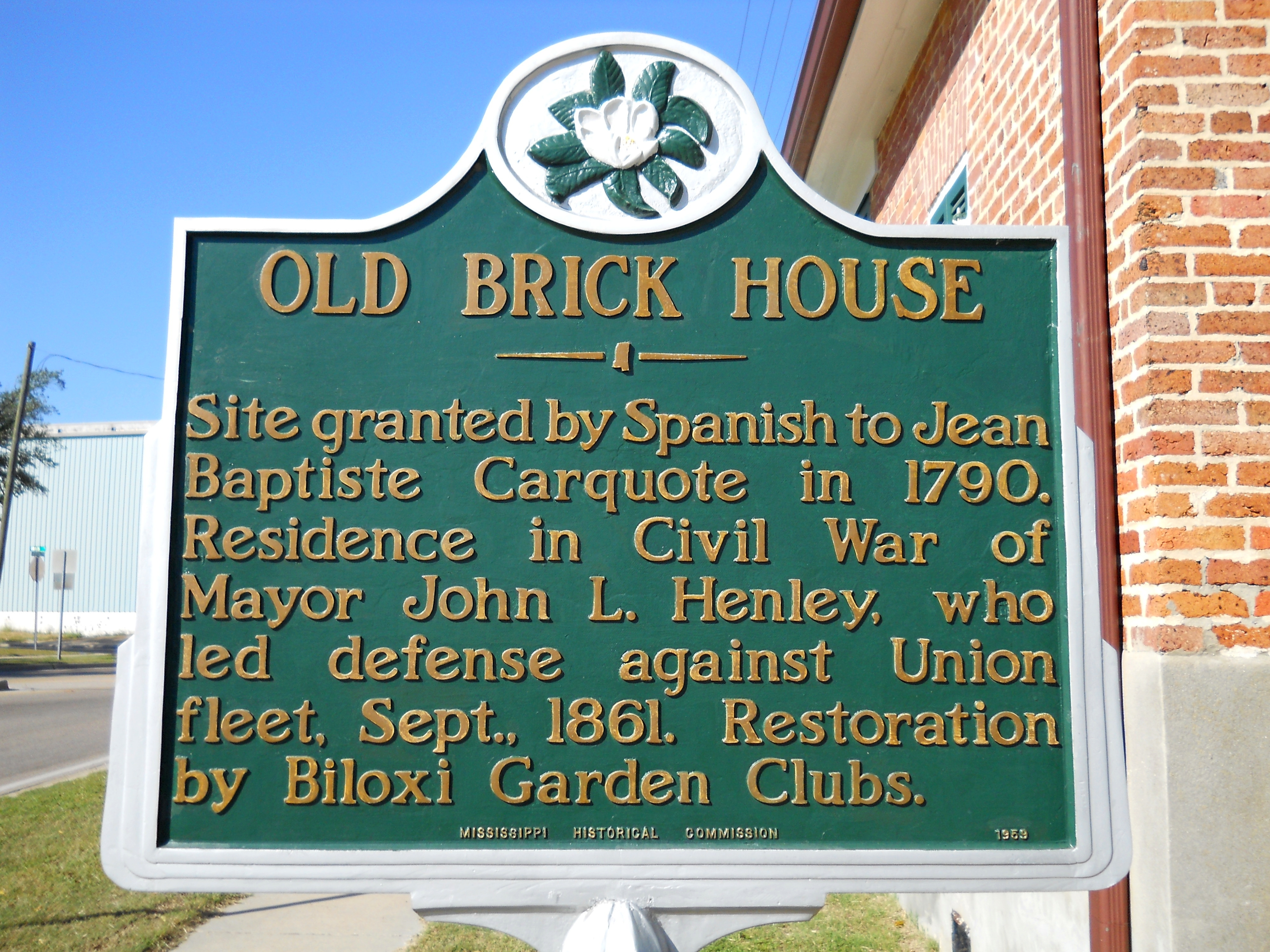

== History ==
The house was built on property acquired by Jean Baptiste Carquotte from the Spanish government as a land grant in 1784. When John Henley built the house, he used heart-pine lumber for the flooring and three layers of brick in the outer walls. The stout, brick construction allowed the structure to survive through 150 years of hurricanes and storm surges. The house is one of the oldest buildings in Biloxi.

The house had become neglected in the mid-1950s, but was salvaged by Biloxi Garden Clubs and was acquired by the City of Biloxi to serve as a museum and a venue for receptions and public gatherings.

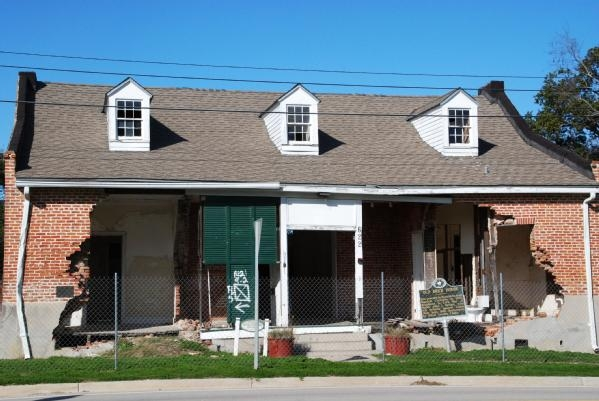
Hurricane Katrina's storm surge collapsed the rear wall in 2005

In 2005, the house was severely damaged by Hurricane Katrina when it was inundated with seven feet (2.1 m) of water from the storm surge. But, the structure survived and was restored to be historically accurate. As of 2011, the Old Brick House was one of only two antebellum homes still standing in Biloxi.

== Note ==
The date of the Spanish Land Grant and spelling of the Carquotte name was not consistent in all references.
