= Josephine (shipwreck) =

History
- Owner: Charles Morgan
- Operator: Louisiana and Texas Railroad and Steamship Company
- Builder: Harlan and Hollingsworth
- Launched: 1868
- In service: 1868
- Out of service: 1881
- Fate: Foundered in storm, February 8–9, 1881

General characteristics
- Type: sidewheel steamer
- Tonnage: 1,283 tons
- Length: 235 ft (72 m)
- Beam: 34 ft (10 m)
- Depth of hold: 18.5 ft (5.6 m)
- Propulsion: Walking beam steam engine
- Capacity: 250 passengers
- Josephine (shipwreck)
- U.S. National Register of Historic Places
- Location: Restricted location between Horn Island and Ship Island, Harrison County, Mississippi
- Built: 1867
- NRHP reference No.: 00001402
- Added to NRHP: November 22, 2000

Josephine was an American iron-hull, sidewheel steamer that transported mail, freight, and passengers, in the Gulf of Mexico, mainly between New Orleans, Louisiana and Galveston, Texas, beginning in 1868. In 1881, the Josephine was transferred to the New Orleans – Havana route. Returning from Havana in February 1881, the Josephine encountered a winter storm in the Gulf of Mexico, south of Biloxi, Mississippi, took on water and sank, but all passengers and crew survived. In 2000, the Josephine shipwreck was listed on the National Register of Historic Places.

== History ==
Early in the 19th century, New York businessman Charles Morgan became a successful entrepreneur by investing in railroad and steamship commerce in the southern United States. In 1867, Morgan contracted with shipbuilder, Harlan and Hollingsworth of Wilmington, Delaware, to construct the iron-hull steamer Josephine for Morgan's Louisiana and Texas Railroad and Steamship Company.

In February 1868, the Josephine made its maiden voyage from Wilmington to New Orleans. At that time, the Josephine was assigned its main transportation route between Beshear, Louisiana and Galveston, Texas. Over the next decade, the Josephine transported mail, freight, and passengers, twice weekly, between Louisiana and Texas.

== Description ==
The Josephine was 235 feet (72 m) in length, 34 feet (10 m) wide, and its depth of hold was 18.5 feet (5.6 m). Propulsion was provided by an 800-horsepower, walking beam steam engine. The ship had two cabins and two decks, and it could accommodate 250 passengers.

== Shipwreck ==
In January 1881, the Josephine had replaced another steamer on the New Orleans to Havana shipping route. In early February 1881, the Josephine departed Havana with a shipment of tobacco and cigars, plus a number of passengers. More passengers boarded in Cedar Key, Florida. After leaving Cedar Key on February 4, en route to New Orleans, the Josephine encountered a winter storm on February 7, developed leaks in her seams, and began taking on water. The 65 passengers and crew abandoned ship on February 8, with no loss of life, and the Josephine sank in 38 feet (12 m) of water between Horn Island and Ship Island.

In 1997 and 1999, the Minerals Management Service obtained underwater photo documentation of the wreck site and collected information using side-scan sonar to confirm the identity of the vessel.
