= Gulfport Army Air Field Hangar =

- U.S. National Register of Historic Places
- Mississippi Landmark
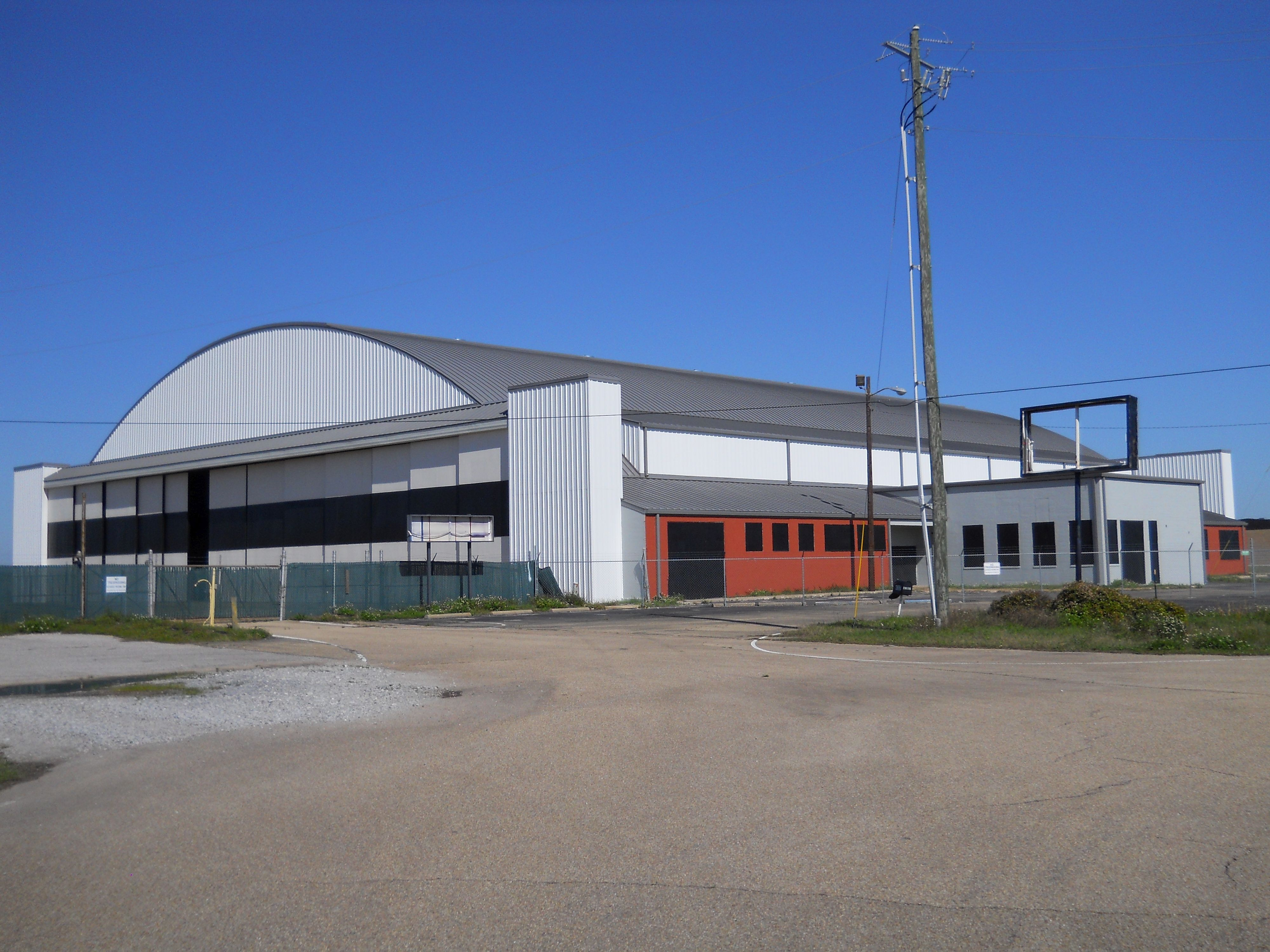
- Hangar in 2016

- Location within Mississippi Location within the United States
- Location: Gulfport-Biloxi International Airport, Gulfport, Mississippi
- Coordinates: 30°24′18″N 89°03′47″W
- Area: 5.47 acres (2.21 ha)
- Built: 1944
- NRHP reference No.: 11000111
- USMS No.: 047-GLF-5902-NR-ML

Significant dates
- Added to NRHP: March 21, 2011
- Designated USMS: July 27, 2012

Gulfport Army Air Field Hangar, also known as FBO Hangar and Gulfport Municipal Airport Terminal, was constructed in 1944-45 for use in training combat crews to operate the B-29 Superfortress. Located in Gulfport, Mississippi, the hangar was added to the National Register of Historic Places in 2011, and was designated a Mississippi Landmark in 2012.

== History ==
In support of the United States entry into World War II, Gulfport Army Air Field was constructed in 1942 to serve as a training facility for aviation units associated with heavy bombers, such as the B-17. In 1944, the War Department expanded the Gulfport Air Field and began constructing the present hangar to accommodate the larger B-29 bomber.

The concrete and steel hangar has a large vaulted roof with one-story, lean-to additions, on the east and west sides, along its length. The hangar is approximately 200 feet (61 m) long, north to south, and 80 feet (24 m) wide. Two-inch thick gypsum planks were used to cover the roof, and the planks were sealed with bitumen. Access to the hangar was through a series of sliding wood doors, covered in sheet metal. Sheet metal was also used as siding for the structure.

When World War II ended, the Gulfport Army Air Field was declared excess property and was transferred by the War Assets Administration to the City of Gulfport in 1949. The western lean-to addition on the hangar was used as the Gulfport Municipal Airport passenger terminal from about 1947 until 1963. The hangar was then leased to various aviation enterprises through August 2005, when the structure was heavily damaged by Hurricane Katrina. Restoration of the hangar began in 2015.

Hangar restoration was completed in May 2016. On May 26, 2016, the Gulfport–Biloxi Regional Airport Authority held an official lease signing agreement, transferring the hangar to the Mississippi National Guard.

== Gallery ==
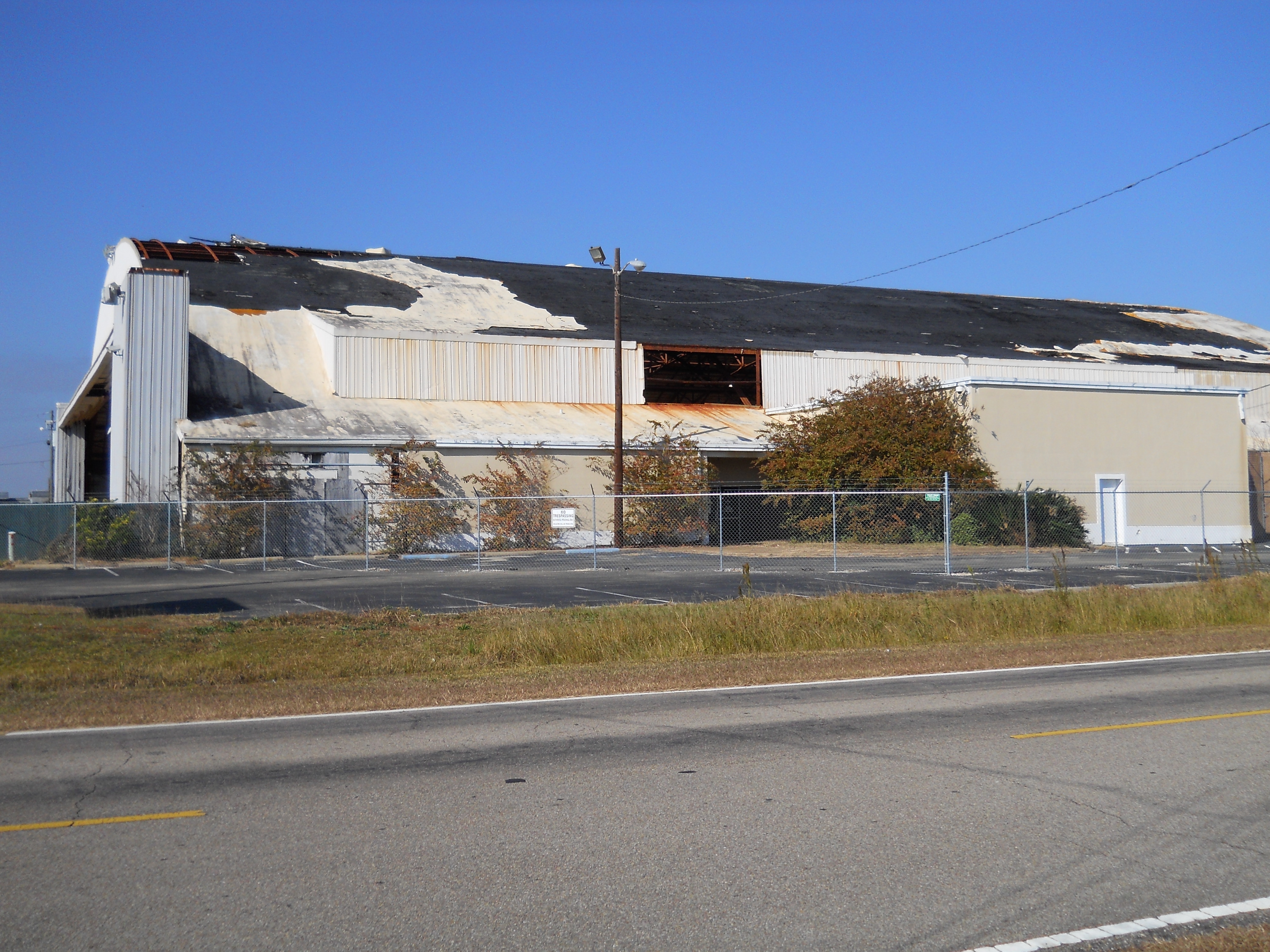
Hangar's east elevation, 2011

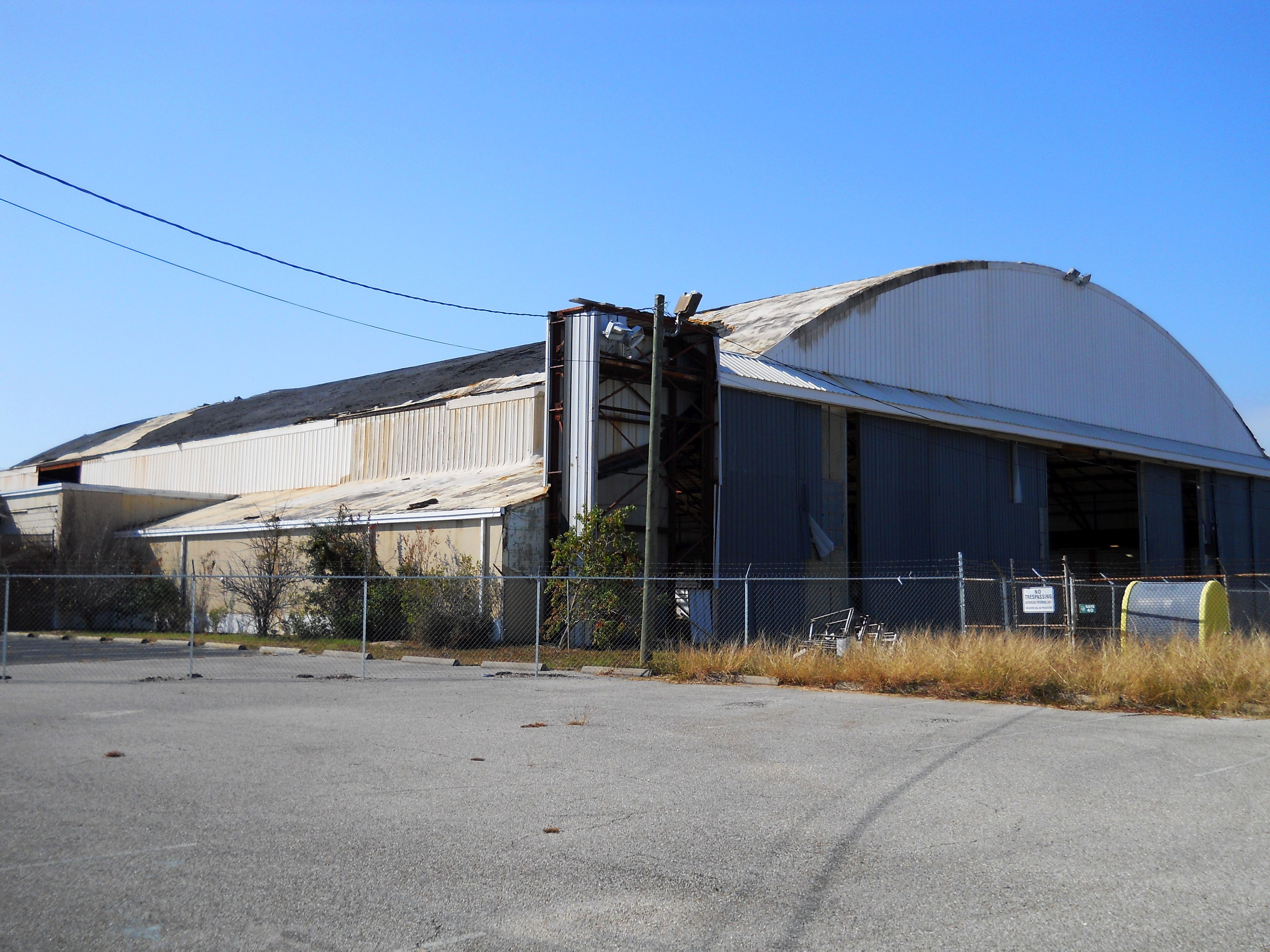
Hangar's northeast elevation, 2011

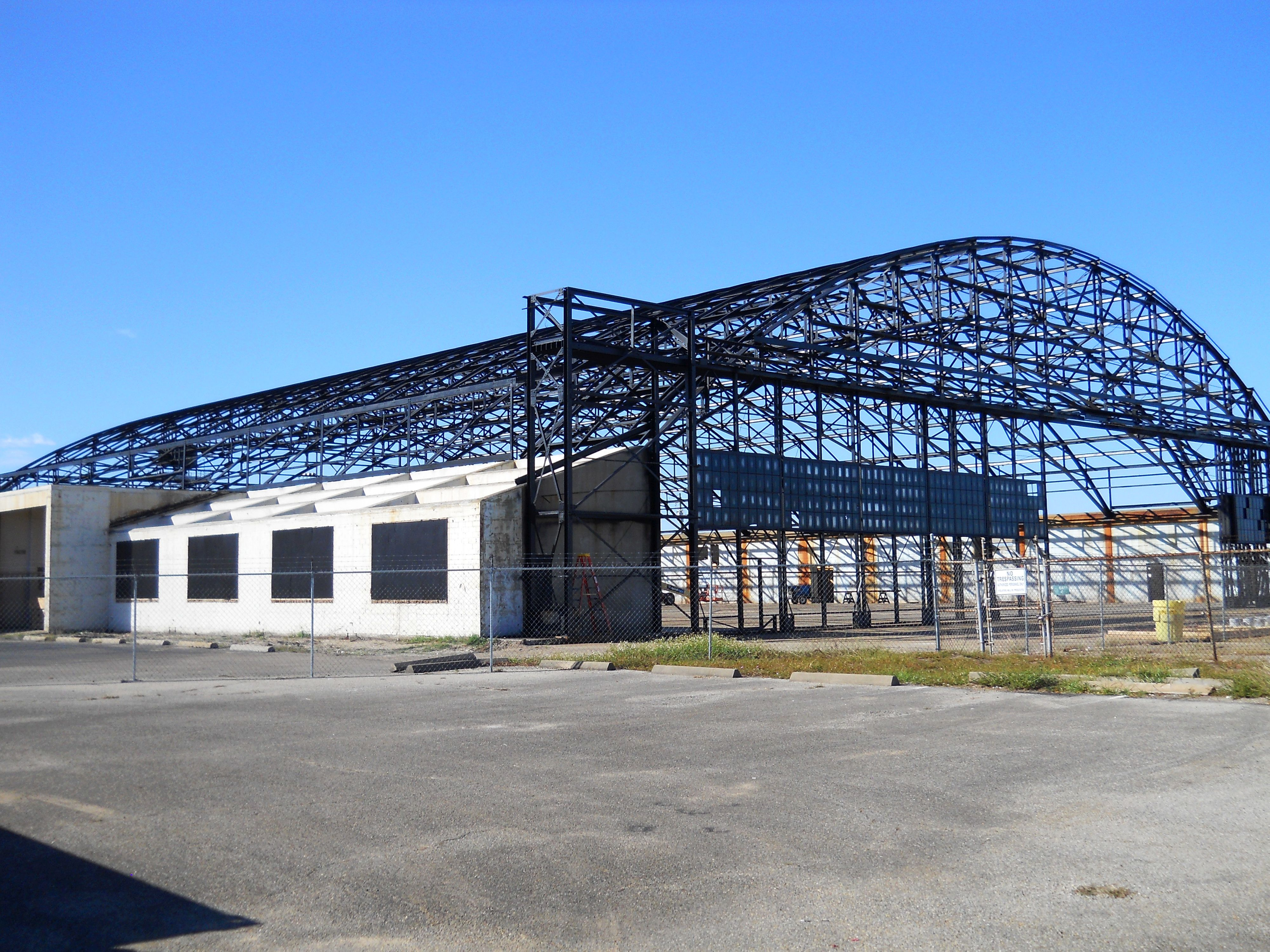
Hangar restoration progress 2015

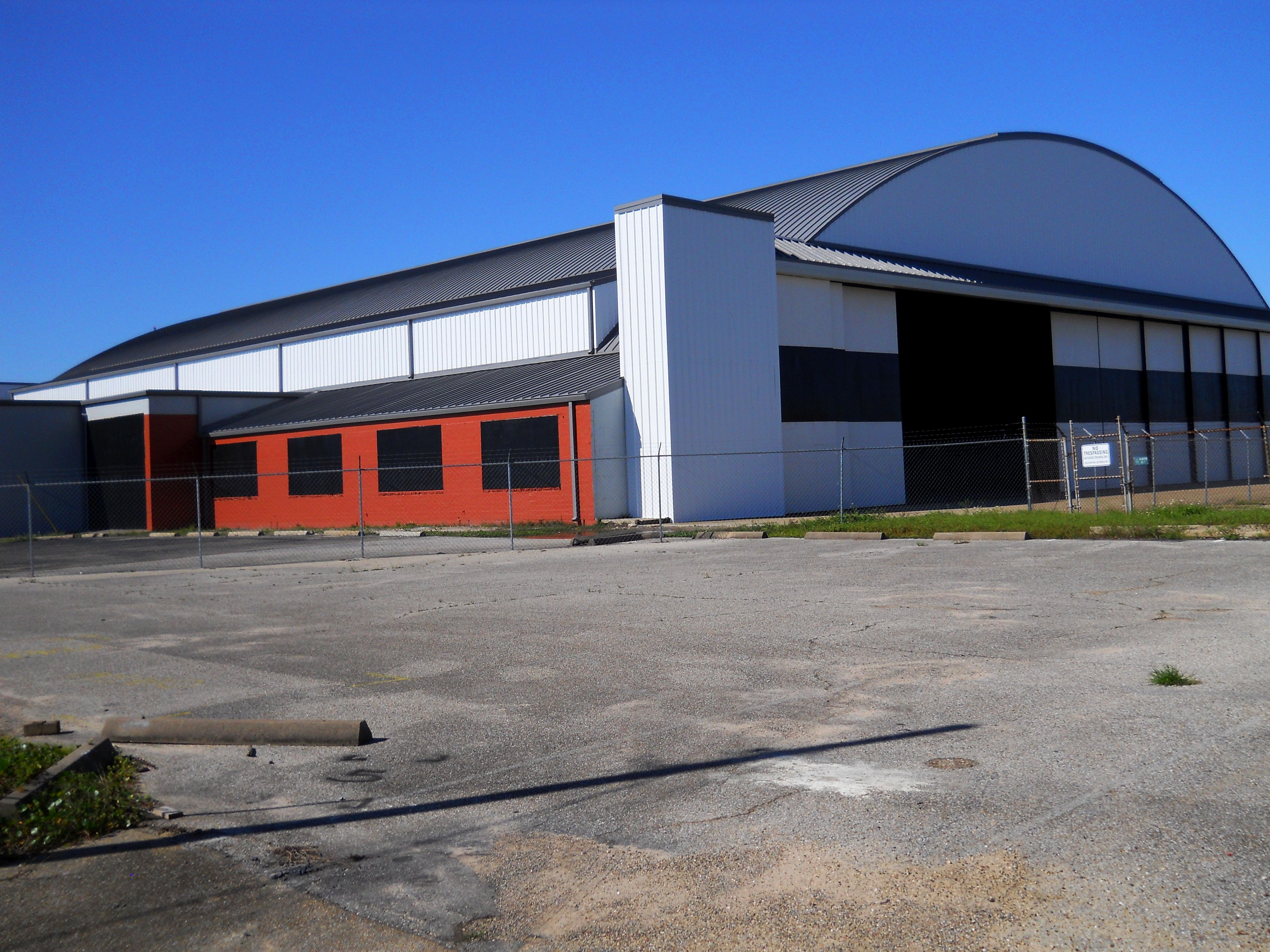
Hangar's northeast elevation, 2016
