= Seashore Campground School =

Church school constructed ca. 1910

- Seashore Campground School [Van Hook Hall]
- U.S. National Register of Historic Places
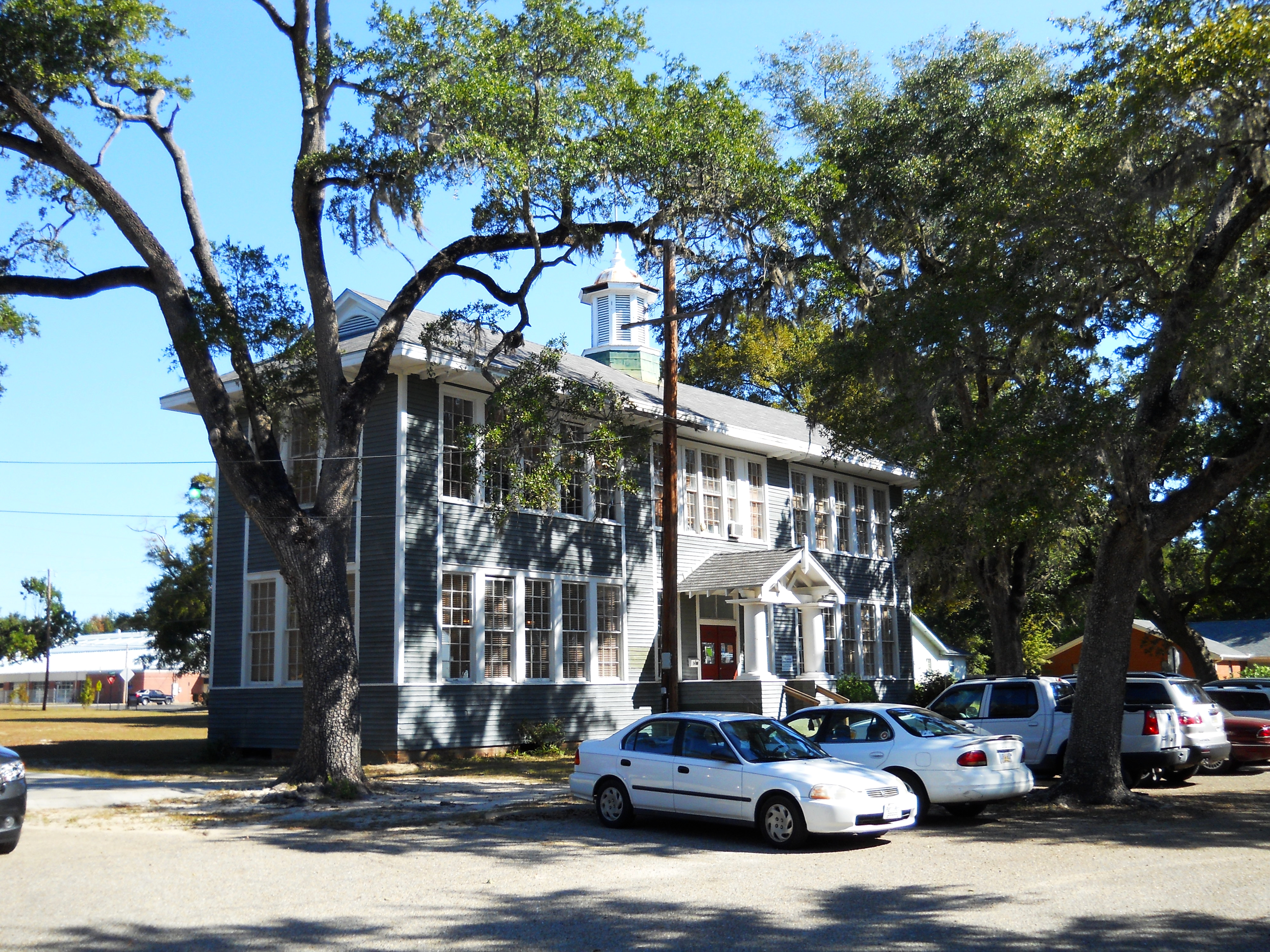
- Van Hook Hall

- Location within Mississippi Location within the United States
- Location: 1410 Leggett Drive, Biloxi, Mississippi
- Coordinates: 30.3956°N 88.92°W
- Area: 0.9 acres (0.36 ha)
- Built: 1910
- Architectural style: Craftsman (bungalow)
- NRHP reference No.: 84002204
- Added to NRHP: May 18, 1984

Seashore Campground School, also known as Van Hook Hall, is a historic school building located on the campus of the Seashore United Methodist Assembly campground in Biloxi, Mississippi. The school is a two-story, wood-frame building constructed ca. 1910 and is the oldest building on the campus. The building was added to the National Register of Historic Places in 1984.

== History ==
By 1870, the Louisville and Nashville Railroad (L&NRR) had been completed across the southern end of Mississippi, connecting New Orleans, Louisiana and Mobile, Alabama. In 1872, Methodist parishioners from New Orleans traveled to south Mississippi under the leadership of John Henry Keller and held their first campground meeting under portable facilities near the shores of the Mississippi Sound. By 1873, the campground had its own L&NRR train station because of regular stops at that location. As time passed, permanent structures were built and Methodist parishioners from throughout the South came to the campground to participate in perennial activities.

== Van Hook Hall ==
The campground developed into an educational complex; and in 1910, Van Hook Hall opened as the campground's private school. The building derived its name from the school's president, H. W. Van Hook. Subjects taught at the school included art, history, languages, mathematics, music, and science.

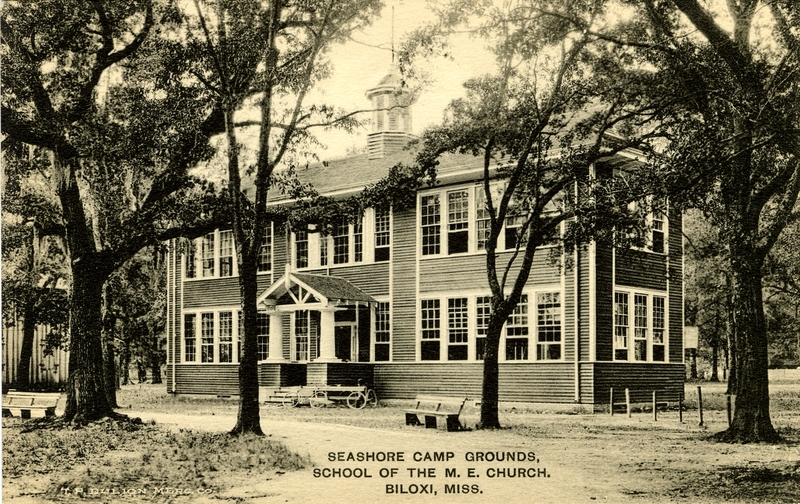
Van Hook Hall ca. 1915

The building is described as, "a two-story, thirteen-by-three-bay, hip-roof, frame building with wide overhanging eaves. The facade fenestration is delineated into three distinct sections and consists of a central three-bay section flanked by two tiers of five, closely-spaced, nine-over-nine, double-hung, sash windows." The building is a Craftsman bungalow style structure topped with a Colonial style cupola. It is the oldest building within the campground campus.

The length of time that Van Hook Hall was used as a private church school is undocumented. In the 21st century, the Seashore Campground facilities were being used for group gatherings, retreats, conferences and family reunions.

Following repairs to Van Hook Hall in the aftermath of Hurricane Katrina in 2005, the building was used by the United Methodist Katrina Recovery effort by hosting volunteer relief organizations such as Habitat for Humanity.

In 2023, the City of Biloxi utilized Van Hook Hall as a law enforcement training center.

The City of Biloxi has identified Van Hook Hall as a Historic Landmark in their Land Development Ordinance, stating that the owner of such property shall maintain the property to prevent deterioration of its historic structural and architectural features.
