= Rushlight =

Candle made by dipping a rush in fat or grease

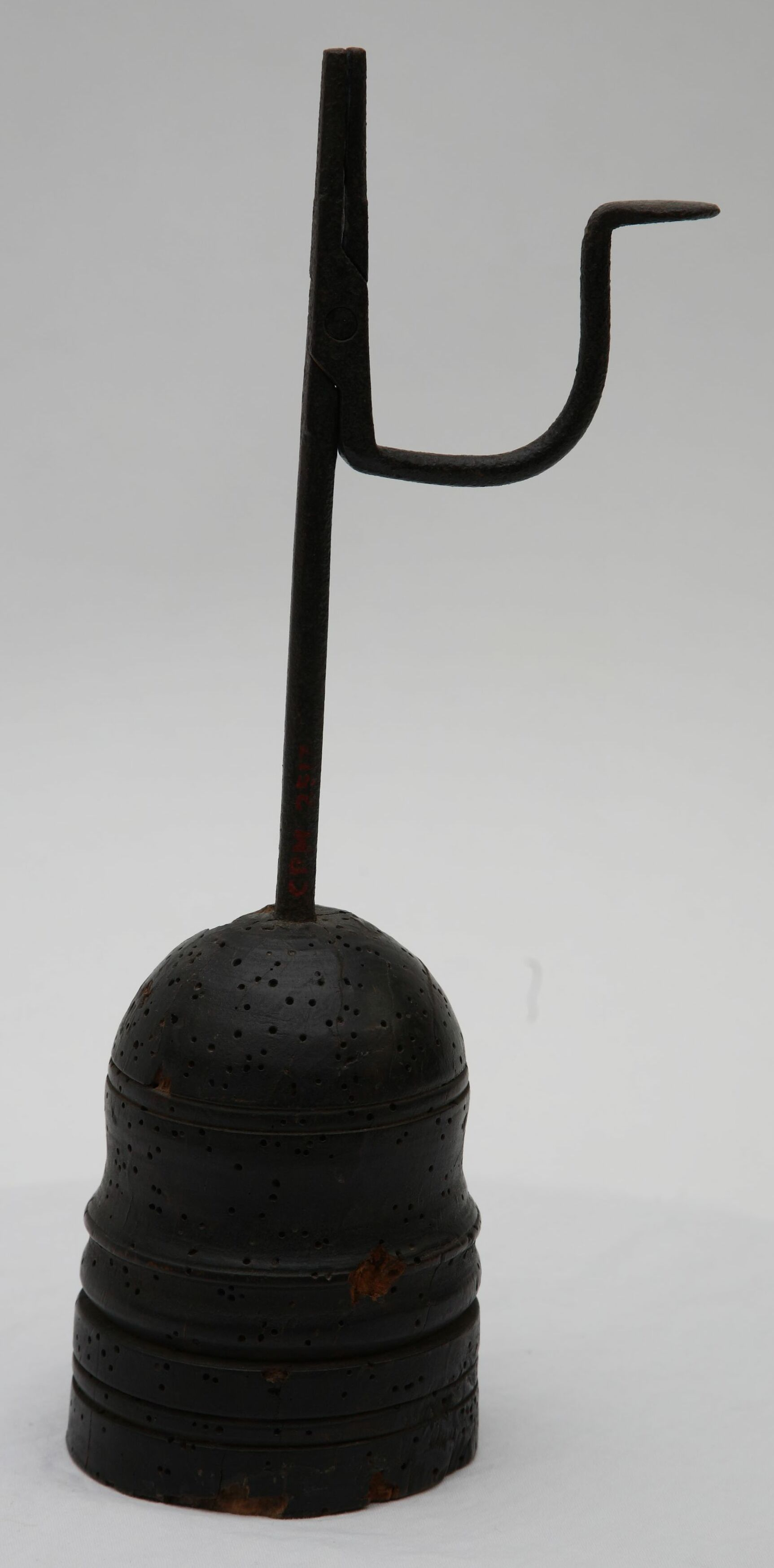
Rushlight fixture with a wooden base

A rushlight is a type of candle or miniature torch formed by soaking the dried pith of the rush plant in fat or grease. For several centuries, rushlights were a common source of artificial light for poor people throughout the British Isles. They were extremely inexpensive to make. English essayist William Cobbett wrote, "This rushlight cost almost nothing to produce and was believed to give a better light than some poorly dipped candles."

One of the earliest printed descriptions of rushlights was written by English antiquary John Aubrey in 1673. Rev. Gilbert White gave a detailed description of rushlight making in The Natural History and Antiquities of Selborne, Letter XXVI (1789). Rushlights were still used in rural England to the end of the 19th century, and they had a temporary revival during World War II. In parts of Wales the use of rushlights continued into the middle of the 20th century.

It is not clear whether rushlights were ever popular in the United States and Canada. Antique rushlight holders are occasionally found in North America, but most were probably imported from England; "none are known to bear the mark of an American smith." In New England, "rushlights were used little if at all in colonial days."

Rushlights should not be confused with rush-candles, although the latter word is attested for the same thing earlier in the 1590s. A rush-candle is an ordinary candle (a block or cylinder of tallow or wax) that uses a piece of rush as a wick. Rushlights, by contrast, are strips of plant fibre impregnated with tallow or grease. The wick is not separate from the fuel in a rushlight.

== Preparation ==
Mature rush stalks are gathered in summer or autumn. The green epidermis or rind of each stalk is carefully peeled off to reveal the inner pith, but a single lengthwise strip of rind is left in place to provide support for the fragile pith. After drying, the rush is then steeped in any available household fat or grease. Bacon grease was commonly used, but mutton fat was considered best by some, partly because it dried to a harder, less messy texture than other fats. A small amount of beeswax added to the grease would cause the rush to burn longer. On more remote Atlantic islands such as St Kilda the stomach oil produced by fulmars was used.

== Duration and quality of light ==
Sources give varying accounts of the length and burn-time of the average rushlight. The book of trades, or Library of the useful arts indicates that the average rushlight was 12 inches (30 cm) long and burned for 10 to 15 minutes. Gilbert White reported that a rushlight 28.5 inches (72 cm) in length burned for 57 minutes; he wrote, "these rushes give a good clear light." There was much variation in the quality of rushlights; a 19th-century writer observed that "one might very well flicker and splutter for an hour, whilst a second was just as likely to flame away in ten minutes."

A differently made rushlight in which two strips of the rind were left on the rush before it was coated with tallow produced a dimmer light but burned much longer. White referred to these as "watchlights".

== Fixtures ==
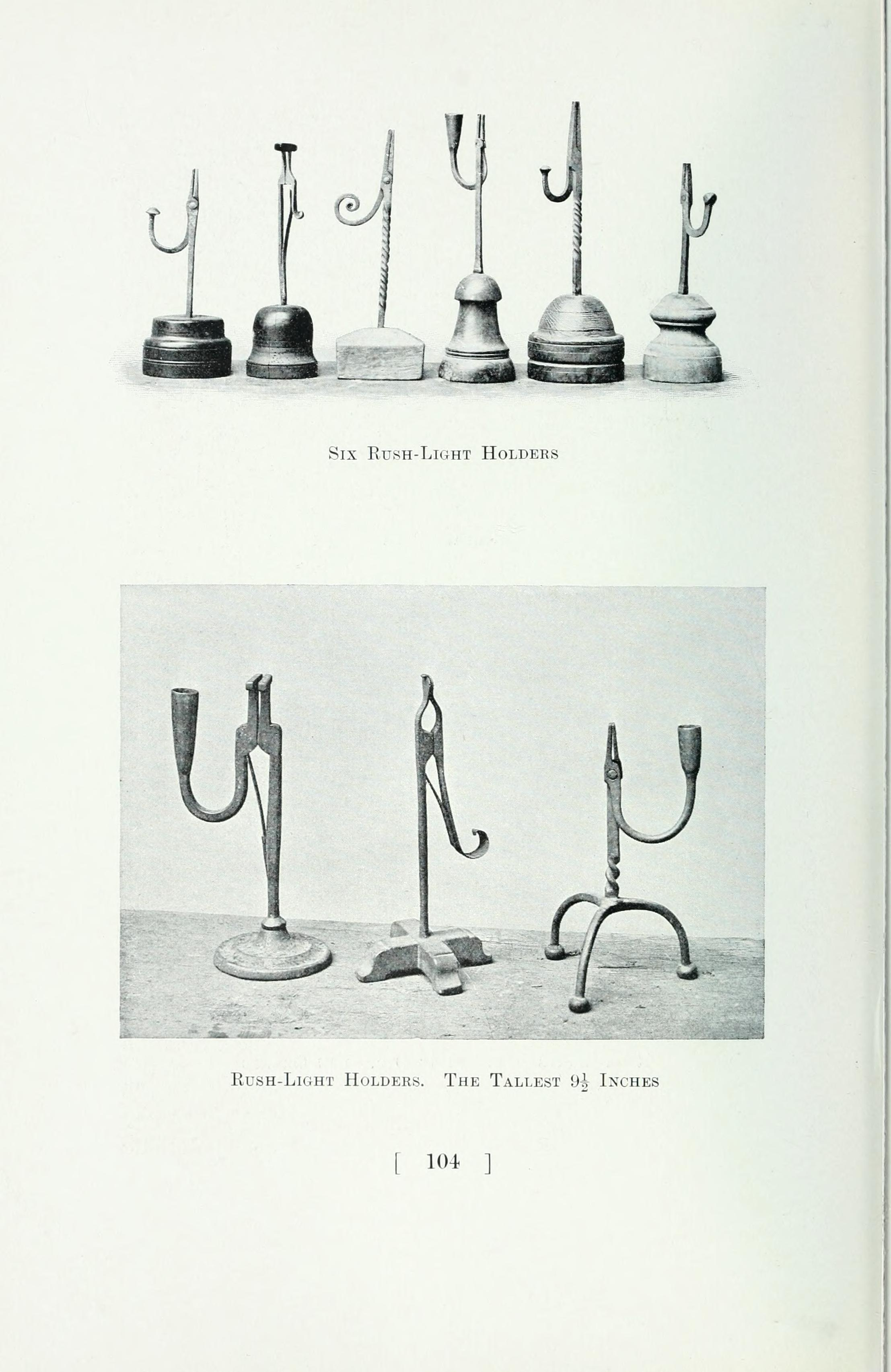
Examples of rushlight fixtures

The burning rushlight was normally held by metal clips at an angle of about 45 degrees. If the rush is held vertically, it tends to have a dimmer flame. If held horizontally, it may burn too quickly. However, there were some devices designed to keep the burning rush in a vertical position, including nightlights made from cylinders of tin or sheet-iron perforated with holes that would allow the light to shine out.

The rushlight holder was usually mounted on an iron tripod or a wooden block. Antique rushlight holders are now collector's items. They were never mass-produced but were individually made by local craftsmen and blacksmiths.

== In literature and culture ==
One of Aesop's Fables, known in English as "the farthing rushlight" or "the vain rushlight," describes a personified rushlight bragging that it is more brilliant than the sun, moon, and stars. The rushlight is then blown out by a slight breeze. The person who re-lights the rushlight advises it to be more humble.

Several magazines are named after rushlights. Rushlight is a literary and visual arts journal founded in 1855 by Lucy Larcom and published by Wheaton College (Massachusetts). The Rushlight is a quarterly newsletter of the International Association of Collectors and Students of Historic Lighting. Rushlight (The Belfast Magazine) is a journal of Belfast history and folklore founded by Joe Graham.

The name Rushlite was used during and for a while after World War II as a trademark of J. V. Rushton of Wolverhampton. "During the war Mr Rushton started to sell his own Rushlite Batteries through Halfords shop."

== See also ==
- Luchina, fatwood, similar lighting implements using a wooden splinter
- List of light sources
