= Joe Graham =

Northern Irish writer and historian (1944–2021)

Anthony Joseph Graham (30 January 1944 – 9 December 2021) was an Irish writer and historian from Belfast. He founded Rushlight: The Belfast Magazine in 1972.

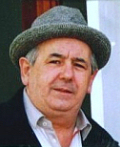
Joe Graham

== Early life ==
Joe Graham was the eighth of twelve children born to Jim and Kitty Graham. He was raised in what was then the newly built Ballymurphy housing estate in the west of the city. He attended St. John's Public Elementary School and later St. Thomas's Secondary Intermediate School. One of his teachers was Michael McLaverty, who himself wrote stories (Call My Brother Back) about the political troubles in Belfast. McLaverty encouraged Graham to express himself in the written word, prompting Graham to write a number of short plays which were staged and performed locally in his own community. Graham's interest in writing and politics deepened.

Graham's father, Jim, would take his son on bike rides and excursions across the length and breadth of County Antrim to ensure that Joe developed a clear knowledge of many of the historical events that occurred there – particularly the 1798 rebellion in which the Graham family played a prominent role: Watty Graham, an ancestor, was executed by the British in 1798.

On one excursion when Graham was only 12 years old, he and his father visited a graveyard situated in Mallusk, close to Templepatrick. At the back of the graveyard Graham looked at a tall monument erected to the memory of the famed James Hope. Right beside his grave was that of his son, Luke. Inscribed on Luke Hope's grave was a word that caught the 12-year-old Joe's eye – the word was "Rushlight". Luke Hope published his "Rushlight" on 3 December 1825, from Clark & Hope's General Printing Office in High Street, in Belfast. It received the name Rushlight after a form of candle. However, the paper went out of print after 41 editions and Luke Hope died a young man.

== Social activism ==
In 1967, at the age of 23, Joe Graham became the editor of The Pike, an Irish republican news sheet. His involvement in this publication gave Graham the opportunity to publish his views on such issues as the Special Powers Act and share his opinion with the local community. His interest in civil rights motivated his presence in Duke Street, Derry, on 5 October 1968 and on 4 January 1969 at the Burntollet Ambush, where marchers, many of whom were members of a student body named "The People’s Democracy", were physically assaulted by loyalists. In 1969, he became a founding member of the Belfast & District Civil Rights Group, the Ardoyne Citizen's Action Committee and the Belfast Housing Action Committee. These groups were established to address the need for the provision and improvement of housing in Catholic areas.

== Rushlight magazine ==
Graham's grave in Milltown Cemetery, Belfast

In 1972, Graham published Rushlight - The Belfast Magazine. In it he shared the stories his father had originally shared with him as a boy as well as his own historical research and study. The magazine included articles of local interest, folklore and tales of old Belfast. The Rushlight proved to be a staple part of Belfast literature with copies being forwarded by locals to relatives around the world, as well as copies being held in the Linen Hall Library Catalog, as well as at the Queen's University Library Catalogue, both in Belfast.

In May 2002, Joe Graham was awarded the "Irish Hand" for his "continued and appreciated contribution of Rushlight Magazine to the Irish communities in Belfast, Brompton, Canada and around the world". In 2008, he wrote Show Me The Man – The Official Biography of Martin Meehan.

== Other writing ==
- Show Me The Man – The Official Biography of Martin Meehan (2008)
- Belfast, Born, Bred and Buttered (2003)
- Ghostly Tales of Old Belfast (1995)
- Where The Lagan Flows (1984)
- The Belfast Quiz Book (1981)
- Old Belfast (1981)
- The Rushlight (written and published since 1972)

== Interviews ==
Joe Graham has been interviewed for or his work has been written of and/or reviewed by the following:

- Downtown Radio (Belfast) - The Bobby Hanvey "Ramblin' Man" Show (10 and 17 September 2004; 16 August 2009)
- "The Night the Troubles Started" BBC Radio Ulster (9 August 2009)
- The Derry Journal (9 May 2008)
- The Sunday World (20 October 1991, 23 March 2008 and 11 May 2008)
- The Belfast Newsletter (17 May 1993)
- The Andersonstown News
- The Belfast Telegraph
- The Porterville Recorder (California) (20 April 1981)
- The Irish Echo

His work and knowledge of local Irish history has been listed as a source in the following:

- Voices From the Grave TV Documentary (Deer Lake Films) aired 26 October 2010 RTE
- Beauty & Atrocity by Joshua Levine (Collins) (2010) ISBN 978-0-00-730947-4
- Standby Studio by Anne Hailes (Shanway Press)(2009) ISBN 978-0-9560101-4-8
- Northern Divisions – The Old IRA and The Belfast Pogroms 1920 -1922 by Jim McDermott, Beyond The Pale Publications (2001) ISBN 1-900960-11-7
- Belfast's Unholy War by Alan F. Parkinson, The Four Courts Press (2004) ISBN 1-85182-792-7
- Republican Internment and the Prison Ship Argenta 1922: S.S. Argenta Legacies by Denise Kleinrichert, Published by Irish Academic Press, (2001) ISBN 0-7165-2683-2, ISBN 978-0-7165-2683-4
- Cathal O'Byrne and the Northern Revival in Ireland, 1890-1960 by Richard Kirkland. Published by Liverpool University Press, (2006) ISBN 1-84631-045-8, ISBN 978-1-84631-045-4
- Ardoyne: The Untold Truth by Ardoyne Commemoration Project. Beyond the Pale Publications, (2002) ISBN 1-900960-17-6, ISBN 978-1-900960-17-5
- Falls Memories by Gerry Adams. Published by Brandon, (1982) ISBN 0-86322-013-4, ISBN 978-0-86322-013-5
