= Al Altaev =

Russian writer

Margarita Vladimirovna Rokotova
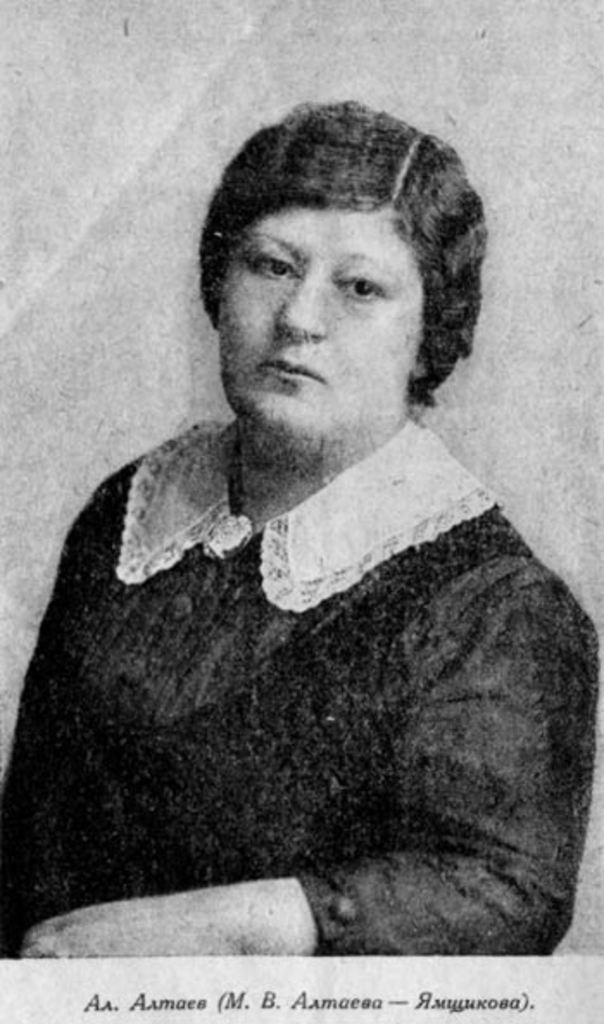
- Born: 22 November 1872; Kyiv
- Died: 13 February 1959 (aged 86); Moscow
- Occupation: Writer
- Writing career
- Pen name: Al Altaev
- Genre: Children's books

Margarita Vladimirovna Rokotova writing as Al Altaev (22 November 1872 – 13 February 1959) was a Soviet children's book author.

== Life ==
Margarita Vladimirovna Rokotova was born in Kyiv in 1872. In 1889 she began a writing career after initially training as an artist. She received early advice from the poet Yakov Polonsky and she quickly adopted a male sounding name, Al Altaev. The name was taken from one of Polonsky's short stories.

Her writing career started well but she married a forestry worker named Iamshchikov, who burnt her stories intended for magazines. Rokotova left her husband with her passport but she took their daughter. She supported herself for six years by copying documents whilst she attended police stations to explain her lack of documentation. In 1899 she published a biography she had written of the poet Semyon Nadson, who had died in 1877.

Revolution was beginning and Rokotova's flat in St. Petersburg was the publishing house of the left wing student newspaper Young Russia. She was drafted in to help with two Bolshevik newspapers after the October Revolution at the Smolny Institute. As a result, she met many of the leading revolutionists like Lenin.

She was drafted to do publicity work in Moscow where she stayed at the Metropole Hotel for years. In time, her daughter began to assist her. She adopted the name of Art. Feliche.

== Death and legacy ==
Altaev died in 1959 in Moscow, ending a 70-year literary career. She had written about 200 books but many were forgotten. Many of her books were biographies of famous people of history or historical novels for children. She had also written a good number of stories that she was able to compile into books.

There is an Al. Altaev Literary and Memorial House and Museum in the Pskov region.
