= Fatwood =

Material derived from pine trees

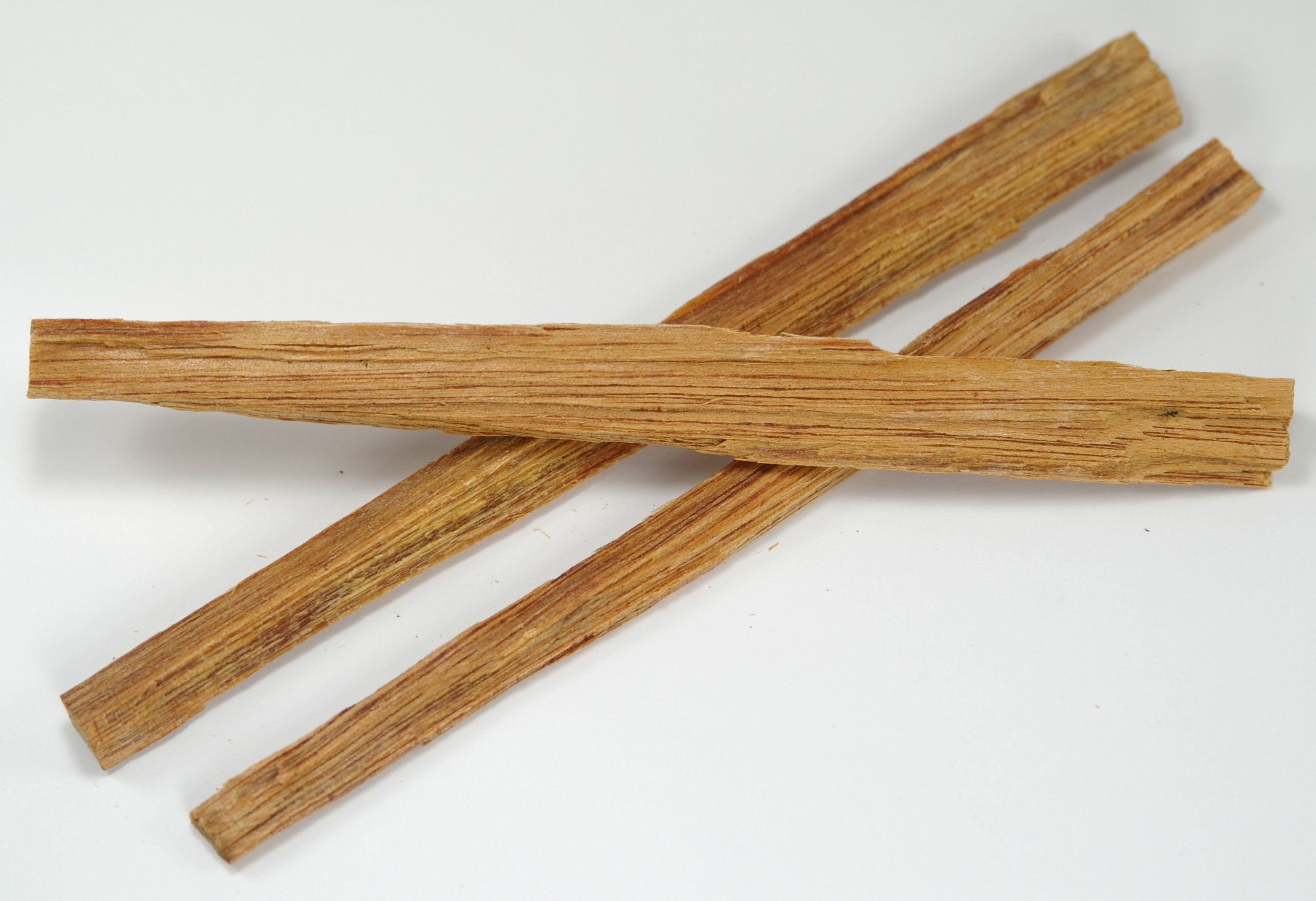
Slivers of fatwood, used for starting fires.

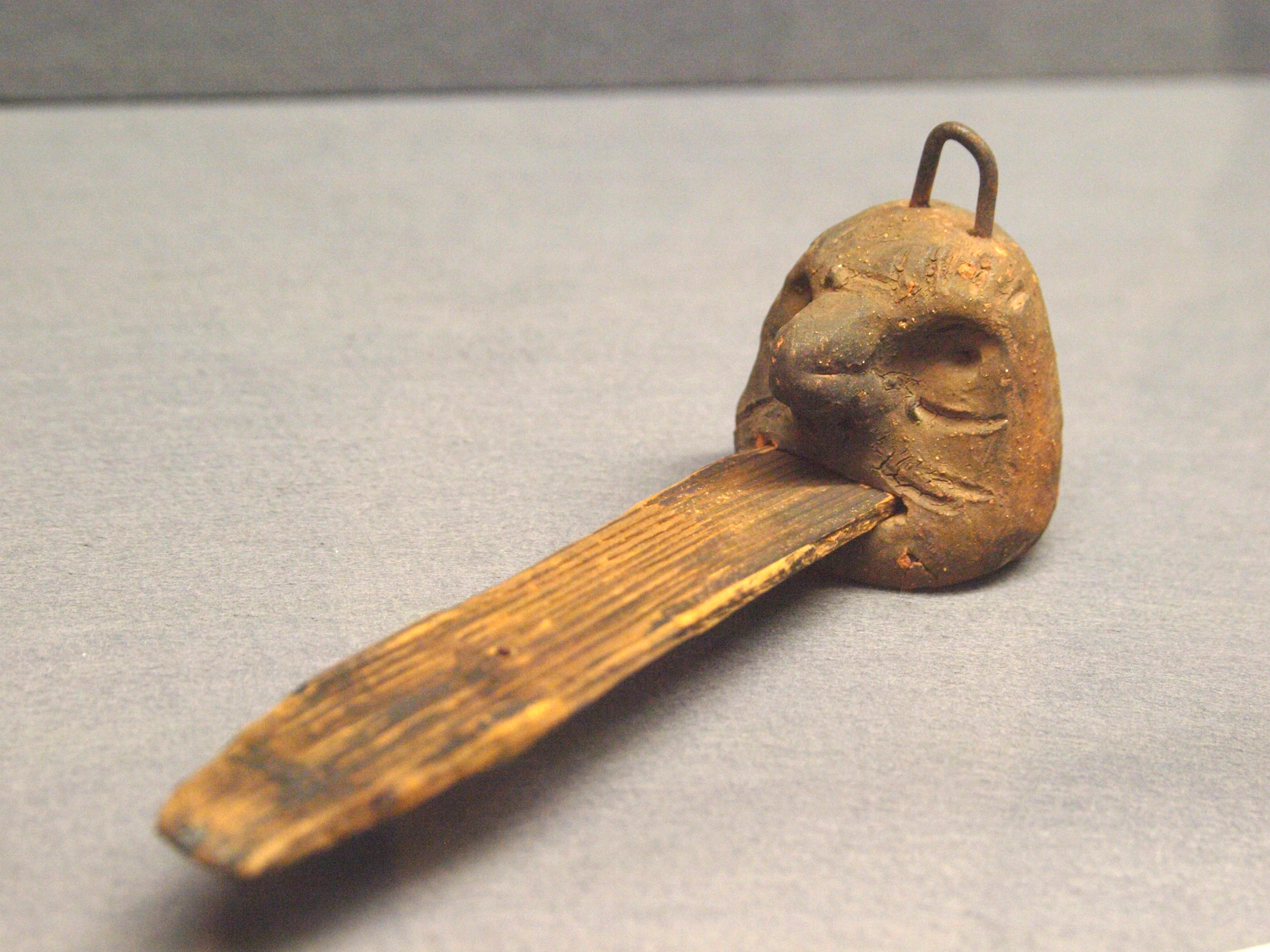
Fatwood holder made of clay with fatwood stump, lower Rhine area, Germany, 18th or 19th century

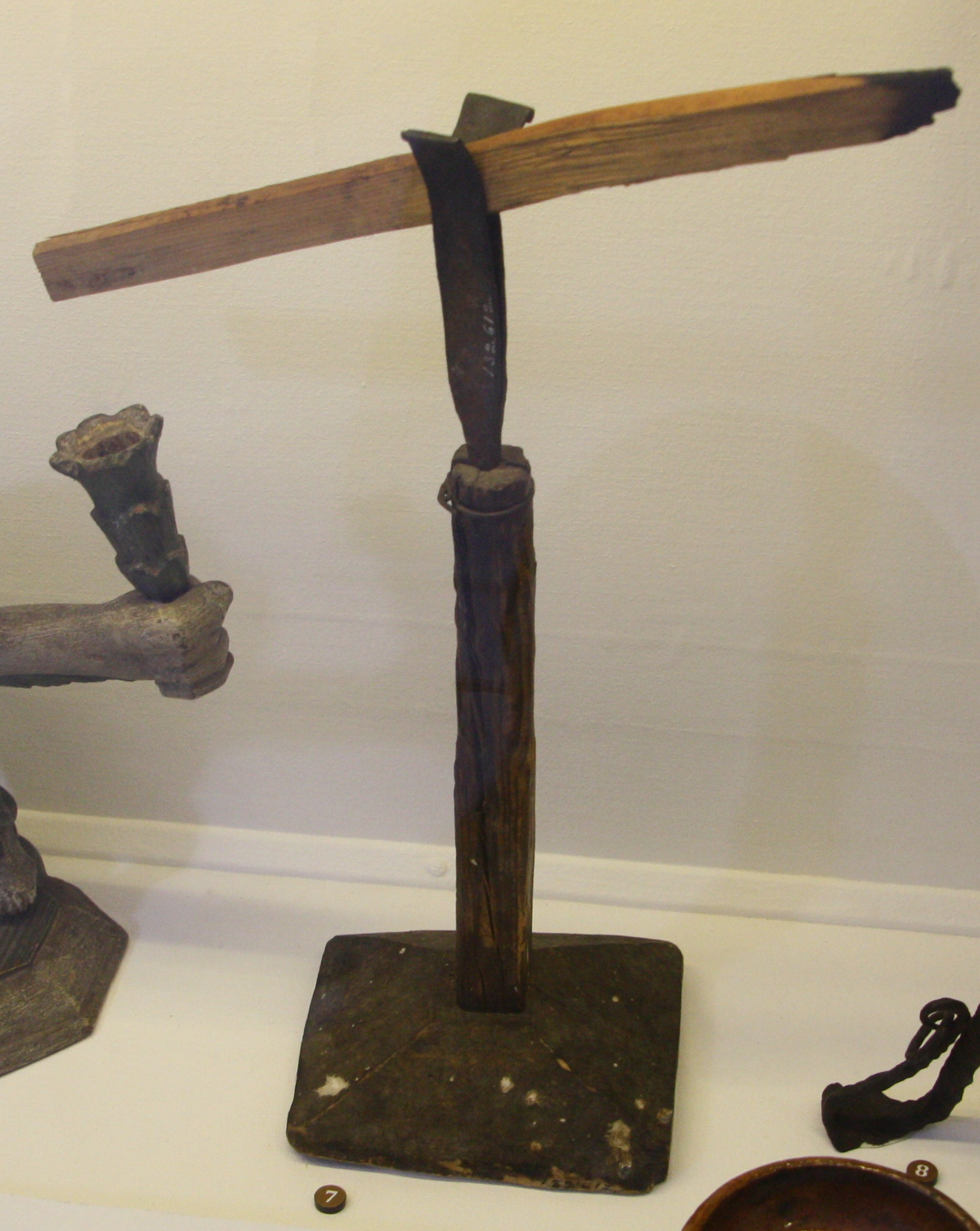
Holder for kindling stick, Källsjö parish, Halland – Nordiska museet, Stockholm

Fatwood, also known as "fat lighter", "lighter wood", "rich lighter", "pine knot", "lighter knot", "heart pine", "fat stick" or "lighter'd" [sic], is derived from the heartwood of pine trees. The stump (and tap root) that is left in the ground after a tree has fallen or has been cut is the primary source of fatwood, as the resin-impregnated heartwood becomes hard and rot-resistant after the tree has died. Wood from other locations can also be used, such as the joints where limbs intersect the trunk. Although most resinous pines can produce fatwood, in the southeastern United States the wood is commonly associated with longleaf pine (Pinus palustris), which historically was highly valued for its high pitch production.

== History ==
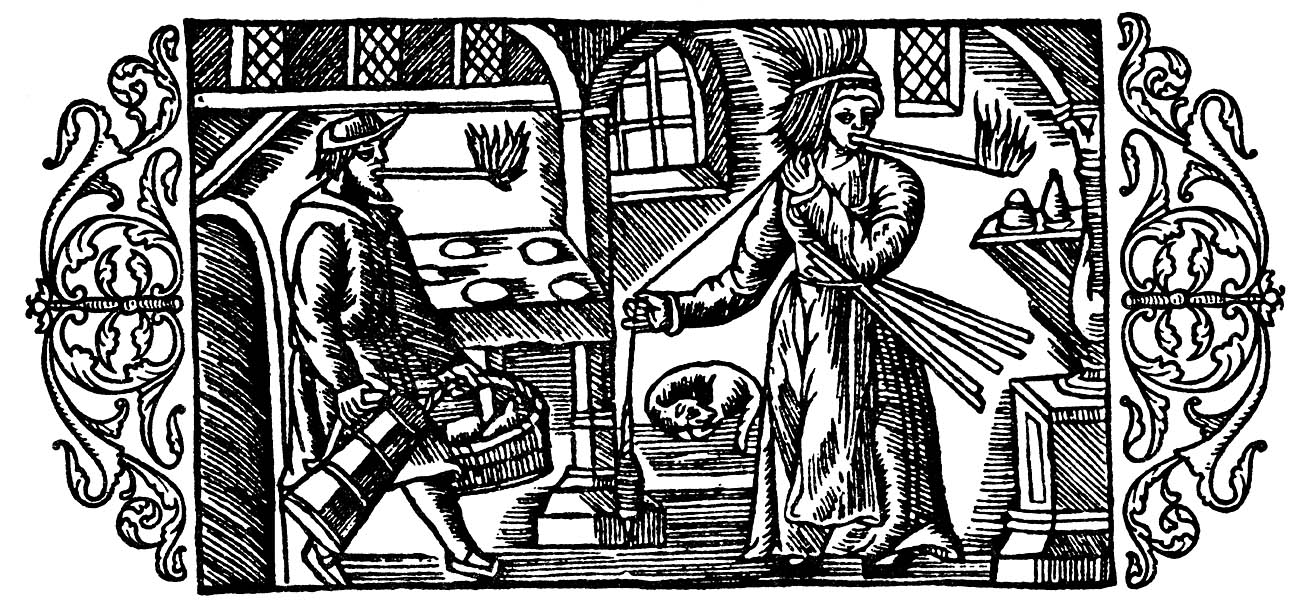
Using fatwood lighters while working in Olaus Magnus' Historia de gentibus septentrionalibus (1555)

The commercial use of fatwood from stumps stemmed from the production of pitch and pine tar. In 1648, a company was formed in Sweden called Norrländska Tjärkompaniet (The Wood Tar Company of North Sweden), and was given exclusive export rights for pine tar by the King of Sweden.

== Composition ==
Coniferous tree sap is a viscous liquid that contains terpene, a volatile hydrocarbon. Over time the evaporation of the terpene changes the state of the sap; it slowly gets thicker until it hardens into resin. New fatwood leaks the sticky sap, while in aged fatwood the sap has hardened and is no longer sticky. At every stage of the aging process, fatwood will burn readily, unless excessively damp.

== Wood kindling and tinder ==
Because of the flammability of terpene, fatwood is prized for use as kindling in starting fires. It lights quickly even when wet, is very wind resistant, and burns hot enough to light larger pieces of wood. A small piece of fatwood can be used many times to create tinder by shaving small curls and using them to light other larger tinder. The pitch-soaked wood produces an oily, sooty smoke, and it is recommended that one should not cook on a fire until all the fatwood has completely burned out.

Despite its common use as kindling, the terminology "lighter" refers to giving light rather than to igniting.

== Distribution ==
There are between 105 and 125 species classified as resinous pine trees around the world. Species usable for fatwood are distributed across a range including Eurasia, where they range from the Canary Islands, Iberian Peninsula and Scotland east to the Russian Far East. From the Philippines, Norway, Finland and Sweden (Scots Pine), and eastern Siberia (Siberian Dwarf Pine), and south to northernmost Africa. From the Himalaya and Southeast Asia, with one species (Sumatran Pine) just crossing the Equator in Sumatra. In North America, they range from 66°N in Canada (Jack Pine), to Central America to 12°N in Nicaragua (Caribbean Pine). The highest diversity in the genus occurs in Mexico and California. In the sub-tropics of the Southern Hemisphere, including Chile, Brazil, South Africa, Australia, Argentina and New Zealand, the trees are not indigenous but were introduced. Anywhere there is a pine tree or pine stump, there can be fatwood that can be found on the ground, but it is more concentrated and preserved in stumps.

=== The United States ===
In the United States the pine tree Pinus palustris, known as the longleaf pine, once covered as much as 90,000,000 acres (360,000 km^{2}) but due to timber harvesting was reduced by between 95% and 97%. The trees grow very large (up to 150 feet), taking 100 to 150 years to mature and can live up to 500 years. The wood was prized and cutting resulted in many hundreds of thousands of stumps that are very resinous, do not rot, and eventually become fatwood. This ushered in a new industry for many years. There is still a market for the wood, but supplies are less abundant. Due to the length of growing time, the Pinus taeda, also called the loblolly pine, replaced it for commercial replanting, with an economic maturity of only 38 to 45 years.

== Industrial uses ==
Industrial uses for fatwood include production of turpentine; when fatwood is cooked down in a fire kiln, the heavier resin product that results is pine tar. The steam that vaporizes from this process is turned into a liquid that becomes turpentine.

== See also ==
- Luchina
- Rushlight
