= Mississippi Landmark =

Building designation in the U.S. state of Mississippi

A Mississippi Landmark is a building officially nominated by the Mississippi Department of Archives and History and approved by each county's chancery clerk. The Mississippi Landmark designation is the highest form of recognition bestowed on properties by the state of Mississippi, and designated properties are protected from changes that may alter the property's historic character. Currently there are 890 designated landmarks in the state. Mississippi Landmarks are spread out between eighty-one of Mississippi's eighty-two counties; only Issaquena County has no such landmarks.

Adams – Alcorn – Amite – Attala – Benton – Bolivar – Calhoun – Carroll – Chickasaw – Choctaw – Claiborne – Clarke – Clay – Coahoma – Copiah – Covington – De Soto – Forrest – Franklin – George – Greene – Grenada – Hancock – Harrison – Hinds – Holmes – Humphreys – Issaquena – Itawamba – Jackson – Jasper – Jefferson – Jefferson Davis – Jones – Kemper – Lafayette – Lamar – Lauderdale – Lawrence – Leake – Lee – Leflore – Lincoln – Lowndes – Madison – Marion – Marshall – Monroe – Montgomery – Neshoba – Newton – Noxubee – Oktibbeha – Panola – Pearl River – Perry – Pike – Pontotoc – Prentiss – Quitman – Rankin – Scott – Sharkey – Simpson – Smith – Stone – Sunflower – Tallahatchie – Tate – Tippah – Tishomingo – Tunica – Union – Walthall – Warren – Washington – Wayne – Webster – Wilkinson – Winston – Yalobusha – Yazoo

In October 2011, the Mississippi Department of Archives and History removed the .pdf listing from its website, adding a searchable database that is kept up-to-date as new landmarks are designated. This database contains information about many historic buildings in Mississippi, but to return a list of designated Mississippi Landmarks, click the "MS Landmarks" link and enter desired city or county.

Following are the properties listed as landmarks by the Mississippi Department of Archives and History as of August 2009.

== Adams ==
- Adams County Courthouse
- Adams County Jail
- Assembly Hall
- Auburn
  - Auburn Barn and Carriage House
  - Billiard Hall
  - Dairy
  - Kitchen/Service Wing
- Carmel Presbyterian Church
- Carpenter School No. 1
- Carpenter School No. 2
- Neibert-Fisk House
- Britton & Koontz National Bank
- Brumfield High School
- Commercial Building
- Glencannon (also Glenfield)
- Grand Village of the Natchez
- House on Ellicott's Hill
- Illinois Central Railroad Freight Depot
- Jefferson College
  - East Wing
  - President's House
  - West Wing
- William Johnson House
- Laurel Hill Plantation
  - Billiard Hall
  - Carriage House
  - Crypt
  - Eastern Dependency
  - Parsonage
  - St. Mary's Chapel
  - Western Dependency
- Longwood
- Henderson-Britton House (also Magnolia Hall)
- Margaret Martin High School (also Old Natchez High School) designed by Penn Jeffries Krouse
- Institute Hall (also Memorial Hall)
- James Andrews House
- Lawyer's Lodge
- Linton House
- Monmouth
- Natchez Museum of African American History and Culture (Natchez Association for the Preservation of African American Culture / NAPAC Museum) (also Old U.S. Post Office)
- Natchez Bluffs and Under-the-Hill Historic District
  - Little Mexico Property
- Natchez City Park (also The Esplanade)
- Natchez City Hall
- Natchez College
  - Huddleston Memorial Chapel
  - Women's Auxiliary Building
- Natchez Institute
- Prince Street School
- Sadie V. Thompson School
- Selma Plantation House
- Smart-Griffin House (also Angeletty House)
- Stanton Hall
- Palestine Road Sites
- Presbyterian Manse (also The Manse)
- Temple B'nai Israel
- Washington Blocks 4 and 5

== Alcorn ==
- Corinth Clothing Manufacturing Company Building
- Alcorn County Courthouse
- B.F. Liddon House
- Civil War Battlefield Properties
  - Bell Property
  - Briggs Property
  - Brooks Property
  - Burns Property
  - Corona Female College
  - James Crabb Property
  - Ruby Lee Crabb Property
  - Derrick Property
  - David Essary Property
  - Dwayne Essary Property
  - Gerald Essary Property
  - Ginn Property
  - Glisson Property
  - Goodrum Property
  - Griffin Property
  - Johnson Property
  - Kanady Property
  - Rowland Property
  - Steen Property
  - Voyles Property
  - Wilbanks Property
  - William H. Davis Jr. Property
- Clinton Robert Whitaker Property (also Theresa Christine Whitaker Madlinger Property)
- Coliseum Theatre
- Corinth Battlefield
  - Union Battery F
  - Battery Robinette
  - Union Siege Lines (Sherman & Davies)
- Corinth Depot
- Corinth Junior High School
- Liddon Building (405 Cruise St)
- Liddon Building (407 Cruise St)
- Liddon Building (409 Cruise St)
- Glendale School
  - Glendale School Gymnasium
  - Teacher's House (Glendale School)
- Jacinto Courthouse
- Jacinto Doctor's Office
- Veranda House (also Curlee House)

== Amite ==
- Amite County Courthouse
- Confederate Monument
- Amite Female Seminary
- Beech Grove (Thomas Batchelor House), Street community
- Sherman Line School (Rosenwald), near Mixon

== Attala ==
- Attala County Courthouse
- Kosciuscko City Hall (also Old U.S. Post Office)
- Mary Ricks Thornton Cultural Center (also Old First Presbyterian Church)

== Benton ==
- Benton County Courthouse

== Bolivar ==
- Amzie Moore House
- Bolivar County Courthouse (701 Main St)
- Bolivar County Courthouse (200 Court St South)
- Cleveland High School, Cleveland Consolidated School complex
- Cleveland Police Department (also U.S. Post Office)
- Dedwyler Memorial Building (also Bolivar County Health Department)
- Delta State University
  - Bailey Hall
  - Broom Hall
  - Cassity Hall
  - Cleveland Hall
  - Faculty House
  - Fielding Wright Art Center
  - Old President's House
  - Ward Hall
  - Whitfield Gymnasium
- I. T. Montgomery House
- Lake Beulah Berm
- Mound Bayou Bank
- Old Municipal Building and Masonic Hall (also Shelby Lodge No. 478)
- Rhodes Printing Company (also Ellis Theater)
- Rosedale City Hall
- Shaw Consolidated School complex
- Shaw High School Administration Building, Shaw School (White) complex
- Shaw High School Gymnasium, Shaw School (White) complex
- Shelby Depot
- Taborian Hospital
- West Bolivar High School

== Calhoun ==
- E.L. Bruce Company General Store
- New Liberty School
- West Mound

== Carroll ==
- Carroll County Courthouse
- Old Carroll County Courthouse
- Old Carroll County Jail
- Carrollton Community House
- Carrollton Livery Stable
- Carrollton Town Hall
- Black Hawk School
- Loving-Bingham-Gee House
- Masonic Hall (also Carrollton Lodge No. 36)
- Stanhope
- Vaiden School Complex
  - R.C. Weir Memorial Building (also Administration Building)
  - Vocational Building
- Senator J. Z. George house ("Cotesworth")
- Senator J. Z. George Law Office
- Vance Hotel

== Chickasaw ==
- Old Houlka School
  - Administration Building
- Chickasaw County Courthouse
- Civil War Battlefield Properties
  - Davis Property
- Mississippi Hills Property
- Houston Carnegie Library
- Okolona Carnegie Library
- Okolona College
  - Okolona Hall
  - Bratton Hall (also T.D. Bratton Memorial Dormitory)
  - Gazebo
  - McDougall Hall
  - Vocational Agriculture Building
- Okolona Elementary School
- Okolona School Lunchroom/Band Hall
- R.W. Chandler House

== Choctaw ==
- Choctaw County Courthouse
- Ackerman High School complex
- Pinnix Hotel (also Cochran Hotel)

== Claiborne ==
- Alcorn State University
  - Belles Lettres Building
  - Dormitory No. 2
  - Dormitory No. 3
  - Harmon Hall
  - Lanier Hall
  - Oakland Chapel
  - President's House
  - Rowan Administration Building
- Bernheimer Building
- Chamberlin-Hunt-Guthrie Hall
- Claiborne County Courthouse
- Samuel Gibson House
- Grand Gulf Military State Park
  - Grand Gulf Military Park Cemetery
  - Confederate Memorial Chapel (also Sacred Heart Catholic Church)
  - Superintendent's House
  - Wheeless House
- Harriette Person Memorial Library
- Irwin Russell Memorial Building (also Port Gibson City Hall)
- Mississippi National Bank Building
- Port Gibson Battlefield
  - Shaifer House
  - Shaifer Road
- Temple Gemiluth Chessed
- Value Mart Building (also Meyer-Mark Building)
- Widow's Creek Bridge
- Windsor Ruins

== Clarke ==
- Chunky River Bridge
- Clarke County Courthouse
- Enterprise Bridge
- Quitman Depot
- Shubuta Bridge

== Clay ==
- Brogan Mound and Village Site
- Administration Building
- Eutaw Site
- Northside School (also West Point Colored High School and Fifth Street School)
- Tibbee Bridge
- West Clay Agricultural High School
  - Classroom Building
  - Teacherage
- West Point City Hall
- West Point Depot
- West Point Police Station (also Old U.S. Post Office)
- West Point School

== Coahoma ==
- Bobo High School (also Old Clarksdale High School)
- Central Fire Station
- Civic Auditorium
- Clarksdale Carnegie Public Library
- Clarksdale City Hall
- Clarksdale Freight Depot (also Delta Blues Museum)
- Clarksdale Passenger Depot
- Coahoma Community College
  - Tiny Tiger Daycare Center
- J. W. Cutrer House designed by Bayard Snowden Cairns and built in 1916
- Old Greyhound Bus Station
- Larry Thompson Center for the Fine Arts (also Paramount Theater) – A 1918 theater building designed by John Gaisford.
- Yazoo-Mississippi Delta Levee Board Building

== Copiah ==
- Copiah County Courthouse
- Copiah-Lincoln Community College
  - J.M. Ewing Administration Building
- Gatesville Bridge
- Illinois Central Depot
- Homochitto River Bridge
- Masonic Hall (also Golden Square Lodge No. 88)
- Millsaps Hotel
- Mount Hope
- Rockport Bridge
- Old Wesson Public School
- William H. Holtzclaw House

== Covington ==
- Covington County Courthouse

== De Soto ==
- B. F. Wesson House
- City Water Tower
- Cockrum School in Cockrum, Mississippi
- De Soto County Courthouse
- Felix LaBauve House – home of the founder of university scholarships for orphans
- Old Hickahala Creek Bridge

== Forrest ==
- Administration Building (Jefferson Davis Elementary School)
- Administration Building (F.B. Woodley Elementary School)
- Administration Building (Forrest County Agricultural High School)
- Bay Springs School
- Burkett's Creek Archeological Site
- Camp Shelby
  - Building 1071
  - Building 6981
- Dr. J.J. Bethea House
- East Forrest High School (also Leaf River High School)
- East Sixth Street USO Building
- Eaton Elementary School (also NRHP-listed)
- Eureka School
- Old Federal Building and Post Office
- Forrest County Courthouse
- Hattiesburg City Hall
- Old Hattiesburg High School
- Hattiesburg Public Library
- Hawkins Jr. High School
- Masonic Temple (also Hattiesburg Lodge No. 397)
- Pine Eagle Chapel at Camp Tiak
- Saenger Theatre
- Union Station
- University of Southern Mississippi
  - Print Center
  - Administration Building
  - Alumni House
  - Bennett Auditorium
  - College Hall
  - Forrest County Hall
  - Hattiesburg Hall
  - Honor House
  - Mississippi Hall
  - Southern Hall
- Walthall School (also Court Street School)

== Franklin ==
- Bude Depot
- Eddiceton Bridge
- Franklin County Courthouse
- National Guard Armory at the NW corner of Main Street & Olive Street

== George ==
- George County Courthouse
- Lucedale Schoolhouse
- Merrill Bridge (also Pascagoula River Bridge)
- Oak Grove Community Center (also Lucedale Colored School)

== Greene ==
- Greene County Courthouse
- Leaf River Bridge
- State Line School
- Vernal Community Center

== Grenada ==
- Belle Flower Missionary Baptist Church
- Chapel Hill United Methodist Church
- Grenada Bank
- Old U.S. Post Office
- Masonic Temple (also Grenada Lodge No. 31)
- Odd Fellows Cemetery and Confederate Cemetery
- Wild Wings Mounds, also listed on the National Register of Historic Places

== Hancock ==
- Bay St. Louis
  - Little Theatre [Bay Ice, Light, and Bottling Works (Scafide Building)
  - Jackson Landing Site (Mulatto Bayou)
  - Jackson Landing Site A
  - Bay St. Louis City Hall
  - Bay St. Louis Depot
  - Old Bay St. Louis High School
  - Gulfview School
  - Hancock County Courthouse
  - Hancock County Jail
  - Jourdan River School (Kiln Colored Public School) in Kiln, Mississippi, east side of Hwy 603
  - Magnolia State Supply Company
  - McDonald House (Edwards House)
  - Toulme-Trawick-Phillips House (T.L. Trawick House)
  - Valena C. Jones School (Negro)
  - Waveland Civic Center (also Old Waveland Elementary School)
  - Webb School

== Harrison ==
- Beauvoir
  - Confederate Cemetery
  - Confederate Veterans Home Dormitories (non-extant)
  - Confederate Veterans Home Hospital (non-extant)
  - Hayes Cottage (non-extant)
  - Beauvoir Library (non-extant)
  - Manager's House (Beauvoir) (non-extant)
- Biloxi City Hall (also Old U.S. Post Office, Courthouse, and Customhouse)
- Biloxi Lighthouse
- Biloxi VA Medical Center buildings
- Biloxi Visitors Center (also Paul W. Brielmaier House) [Destroyed by Hurricane Katrina, August 29, 2005]
- Creole Cottage (also First Biloxi Library)
- G.B. Dantzler House (also Robinson-Maloney House) [Destroyed by Hurricane Katrina, August 29, 2005]
- Dr. Hiram A. Roberts House (also Joseph William Milner House and Grasslawn)
- Fisherman's Cottage
- Gillis House [Destroyed by Hurricane Katrina, August 29, 2005]
- Glenn L. Swetman House completed in 1926 or 1927
- Grasslawn II
- Gulf Coast Center for the Arts (also Old Biloxi Public Library)
- Gulfport Army Air Field Hangar (also FBO Hangar)
- Gulfport City Hall
- Gulfport Firehouse No. 4
- Gulfport–Harrison County Library
- Old Gulfport High School
- Gulfport Veterans Administration Medical Center
  - Building 1—Main Medical Building
  - Building 2—Kitchen and dining hall
  - Building 3—Ward B
  - Building 4—Ward C
  - Building 5—Ward D
  - Building 41—Infirmary
  - Building 57—Hospital building
  - Building 62—Ward G
  - Building 63—Chapel
  - Building 64—Administration Building
- Old Harrison County Circuit Clerk's Office [Destroyed by Hurricane Katrina, August 29, 2005]
- Gulfpark Campus, University of Southern Mississippi buildings
- Gulfport Depot (also Gulfport Centennial Museum)
- Magnolia Hotel
- Maritime and Seafood Industry Museum (also U.S. Coast Guard Barracks)
- Henriques-Slay
- Phoenix Naval Stores Office in Turkey Creek Community
- Kimble House
- Legier-Frye House
- Masonic Hall (Long Beach, Mississippi)
- Mississippi Sound Historical Museum (also Gulfport Carnegie Library) built in 1916
- Old Brick House (Biloxi, Mississippi), also known as Biloxi Garden Center
- Old Pass Christian High School
- Old Pass Christian Middle School (also Old J.W. Randolph School)
- Marshal and Fannie Nichols House
- Masonic Hall (Rectitude Lodge No. 323)
- Masonic Hall (Southern Star Lodge No. 500, F&AM) / Hancock Bank
- O. G. Swetman House
- Pleasant Reed House
- Saenger Theater designed by Roy Benjamin it opened in January 1929
- Soria City School
- Town Library [Destroyed by Hurricane Katrina, August 29, 2005]
- Tullis-Toledano
  - Crawford House [Destroyed by Hurricane Katrina, August 29, 2005]
  - Tullis Manor (also Philbrick House, Pradat House, and Tullis-Toledano House)
- W.J. Quarles House and Cottage moved from 120/122 East Railroad Street

== Hinds ==
- Alamo Theatre
- Ayer Hall
- Bailey Hill Civil War Earthworks
- Bailey Magnet School (also Bailey Junior High School)
- J.H. Boyd House (also The Oaks)
- Old Bridgeport Road Segment
- Byram Bridge
- Capri Theater (also Pix Theater)
- Castle Crest (also Merrill-Sanders-Holman House)
- John F. Cates House
- Central High School
- Central Fire Station
- Chambliss Building
- Chapel of Greater Mount Calvary Baptist Church (also Our Redeemer Evangelical Lutheran Church)
- City Mound
- Civil War Battlefield Properties
  - McGavock's Hill
  - R&B Land Company Property
- COFO Building
  - Commercial Building (1011 Lynch Street)
  - Commercial Building (1013 Lynch Street)
- Coker House
- Lorena Duling School built in 1927 it was designed by Claude H. Lindsley it is also listed on the National Register of Historic Places
- Elks Building (also Jackson Lodge No. 416)
- Eudora Welty House
- Medgar and Myrlie Evers Home National Monument
- Former First Christian Church
- Flannegan-Lowry House (also Hart-Lowry-Hull-Sands House)
- Fortenberry-Parkman House and Farmstead (also Agriculture and Forestry Museum)
- French Merci Train Boxcar
- Governor's Mansion
- Garner Wynn Green House
- Greenwood Cemetery
- Heber Ladner Building (also Mississippi Title Insurance Company and Mississippi Baptist Convention Headquarters)
- Hinds Community College buildings (Harris Patrick Hall and Adams Jenkins Hall)
- Hinds County Armory designed by Frank P. Gates and built in 1927. Also listed on the National Register of Historic Places
- Hinds County Courthouse (401 Pascagoula St)
- Hinds County Courthouse (127 Main St W)
- J.Z. George Elementary School
- Jackson City Hall
- Former Jackson Municipal Library
- Jackson Water Works Filter Building and Pump No. 1
- Jackson Zoological Park
- Jefferson Davis School
- King Edward Hotel
- Lake House
- Lanier High School
- Ervin Lewis House
- Livingston Park
- Main Hall (Hinds Community College)
- Manship House
- Masonic Temple (also Stringer Grand Lodge)
- Merchants Company Warehouse
- Mississippi River Basin Model Waterways Experiment Station
- Mississippi Federation of Women's Clubs Headquarters
- Naval and Marine Corps Reserve Center
- Mississippi State Capitol
- Jackson Depot
- Old Mississippi State Capitol
- Old Capitol Green
- Ollie M. Bradley Elementary School
- Pocahontas Mound A
- Poindexter Elementary School
- Poindexter Park
- Old Robert E. Lee School
- Robert E. Lee Hotel
- Scott Ford House Complex
  - Mary Green Scott House
  - Scott Ford House (also Lula Ford House)
- Smith Robertson School
- Spanish–American War Monument
- Standard Life Building (also Tower Building)
- Sun-n-Sand Motor Hotel
- Terminal Building, Hawkins Field
- Thimpsons Tank
- Union Station
- W.W. Westbrook House
- War Memorial Building
- Water Tower
- Watkins Elementary School (also Liberty Grove School)
- Welty House Visitor Center (also Armstrong House)
- William Howard Walton Elementary School
- Woodrow Wilson Bridge
- Woolfolk State Office Building

== Holmes ==
- Acona Church, Cemetery, and School, also listed on the National Register of Historic Places The school closed in 1944.
- Alexander Brock Store
- Holmes County Records Building
- Confederate Monument
- Durant School
- Emory United Methodist Church
- Holmes County State Park
  - Holmes County State Park Cabin No. 1
  - Holmes County State Park Cabin No. 2
  - Holmes County State Park Cabin No. 3
  - Holmes County State Park Cabin No. 4
  - Holmes County State Park Cabin No. 5
  - Holmes County State Park Cabin No. 6
  - Holmes County State Park Park Manager's Residence
- Holmes County Courthouse
- Holmes County Jail
- Masonic Temple (also Lexington Lodge No. 24)
- Providence Mound
- T & T Building (also Strand Theater)
- West Methodist Church

== Humphreys ==
- Humphreys County Courthouse
- Jaketown Site – Tract 1
- Jaketown Site – Tract 2

== Itawamba ==
- Carolina Consolidated School
- Fulton Grammar School
- Oakland School

== Jackson ==
- Armstrong-Weider Cottage, part of the Walter Anderson Museum of Art
- Gautier Elementary School
- Louisville and Nashville Railroad Depot at Ocean Springs
- Mary C. O'Keefe Cultural Center (also Ocean Springs Community Center)
- Mississippi Federation of Women's Clubs
- Old Ocean Springs High School
- Ocean Springs Senior Citizens Center
- Old Spanish Fort (De La Pointe-Krebs House)
- Knights of Columbus Hall (Pascagoula, Mississippi), aka Krebs House
- Louisville and Nashville Railroad Depot at Pascagoula
- Old Pascagoula High School
- Round Island Lighthouse (Pascagoula, Mississippi)
- Walter Anderson Cottage

== Jasper ==
- Old Jasper County Jail
- Montrose Presbyterian Church

== Jefferson ==
- Jefferson County High School (also Old Fayette High School)
- Mt. Zion Baptist Church No. 1
- Old Hill Place Bridge
- Rodney Presbyterian Church
- Stephen H. Wilkes House
- Rosswood
- Wagner's Store
- Youngblood Bridge

== Jefferson Davis ==
- Jefferson Davis County Courthouse
- Prentiss Institute Administration Building
- Stephen H. Wilkes House

== Jones ==
- Amos Deason House
- Old George S. Gardiner High School in Laurel, Mississippi built in 1922 and improved in 1940 with WPA funds
- Hatten School
- Jones County Courthouse (Laurel)
- Jones County Courthouse (Ellisville)
- Lamar Elementary School
- Laurel City Hall designed by Penn Jeffries Krouse opened in 1914. Also listed on the National Register of Historic Places
- Laurel Depot
- Oak Park School building
- Stewart M. Jones Junior High School

== Kemper ==
- Kemper County Courthouse
- Lynnville School buildings

== Lafayette ==
- Cedar Oaks
- Lucius Quintus Cincinnatus Lamar House
- Lafayette County Courthouse
- Oxford City Hall (also Old U.S. Post Office and Federal Building)
- Oxford Depot
- Old Power Plant
- Price-Crawford House (also Washington Price House)
- Stark Young House (also Walton-Young House)
- The Belfry
- University of Mississippi
  - University House
  - Bondurant Hall
  - Chemistry Building
  - Farley Hall (also Lamar Hall)
  - Bryant Hall
  - Fulton Turner Hall (also Fulton Chapel)
  - Lyceum Building
  - McCain Hall
  - Peabody Hall
  - Ventress Hall
  - Y.M.C.A. Building
- Rowan Oak (William Faulkner House)

== Lamar ==
- Baxterville School Gym
- Lamar County Courthouse
- Old Municipal Courtroom and Jail

== Lauderdale ==
- Dement House at 2011 23rd Avenue
- Grand Opera House, an opera house, then a theater, and now part of Mississippi State University's Riley Center for Education and Performing Arts
- Highland Park, also listed on the National Register of Historic Places
- Highland Park Dentzel Carousel and Shelter Building
- Lauderdale County Courthouse designed by Penn J. Krouse
- Lauderdale County Courthouse Annex (also Lamar Hotel)
- Lauderdale County Tourism Bureau, the former Greyhound Bus Depot, listed 2022
- Marks-Rothenberg Building
- Mattye Hersee Hospital
- Meridian Museum of Art, a former Carnegie Library completed in 1913
- Meridan Police Station
- Meridian Water Works
- Merrehope, a residence also listed on the National Register of Historic Places
- Meridian City Hall
- Newberry Building
- Oakes-Bonita I Site
- Union Station R.E.A. Building
- Ross's Storage Building

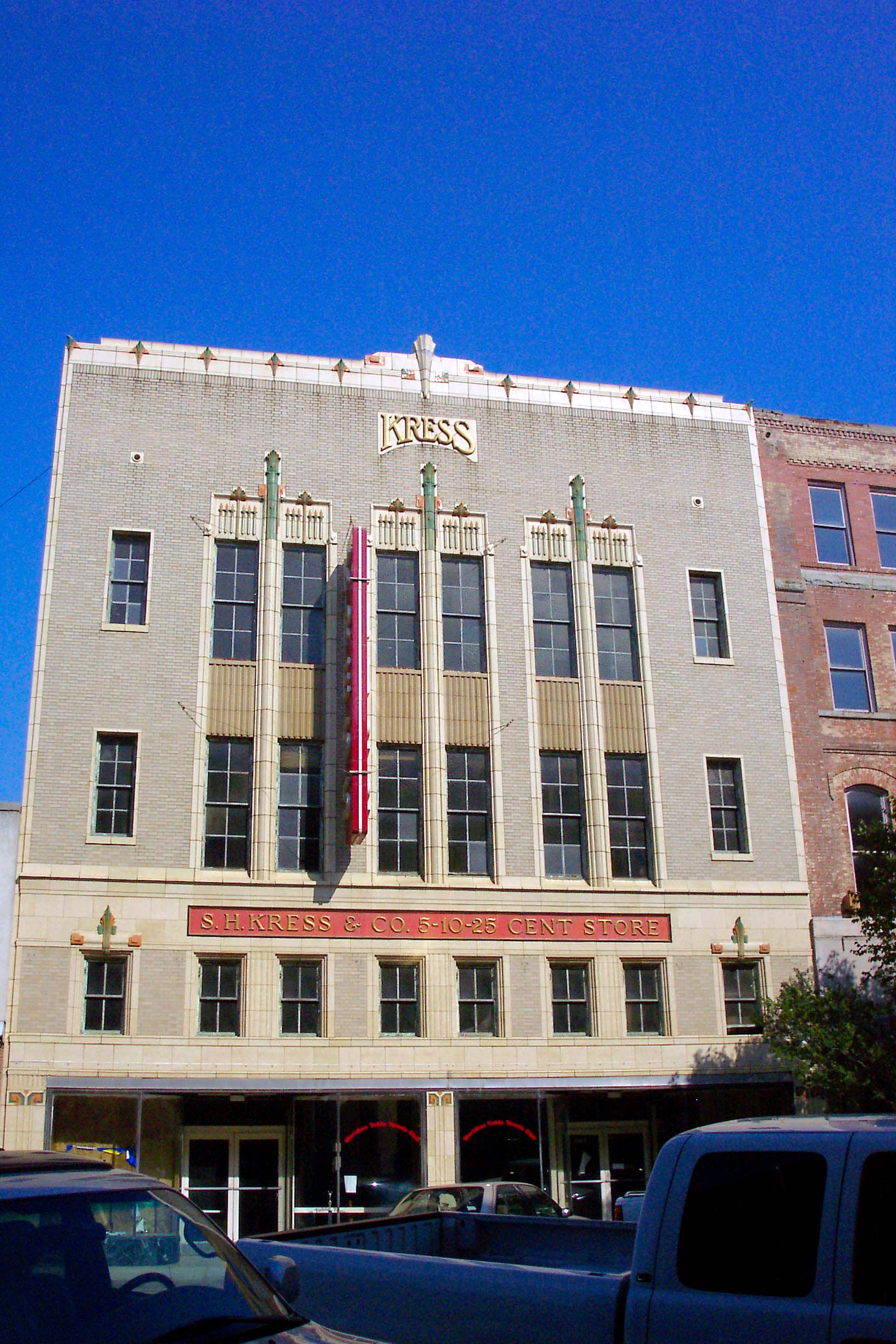
S.H. Kress & Co. building in Meridian

- S.H. Kress & Co. designed by Edward F. Subbert and built in Meridian in 1934, has Egyptian motifs and a terra cotta frieze. Part of the Meridian Downtown Historic District
- Soulé Steam Feed Works (402 19th Ave)
- Soulé Steam Feed Works (1809 5th St)
- Soulé Steam Feed Works (1806 4th St)
- Soulé Steam Feed Works (1808 4th St)
- Soulé Steam Feed Works (1803–1805 5th St)
- Stevenson Primary School
- Stuckey's Bridge
- Threefoot Building
- Ulmer Building in Meridian
- Wechsler School
- Frank W. Williams House
- Witherspoon School (also East End School)

== Lawrence ==
- Armstrong-Lee House residence built by Jasper Armstrong in Arm, Mississippi
- Bahala Creek Bridge
- Monticello Depot
- Lawrence County Courthouse
- Old Monticello Consolidate School
- Pretty Branch Bridge
- White Sand Creek Bridge

== Leake ==
- Carthage Elementary School
- Leake County Courthouse
- Lena School Gymnasium

== Lee ==
- Church Street Elementary School (also North Church Primary School)
- Civil War Battlefield Properties
  - Carpenter Property
  - Duvall Property
  - Epting Property
  - Bill Hardy Property
  - Leslie Property
- Elvis Presley Birthplace
- Lee County Road 681
- Lee County Courthouse
- Tombigbee State Park

== Leflore ==
- Columbus and Greenville Railroad Passenger Depot
- Confederate Memorial Building in Greenwood
- Davis Elementary School (also Old Greenwood High School)
- Elks Club (also Greenwood Lodge No. 854)
- Old Fire Station No. 1 (also Red Cross Building)
- Old Greenwood Leflore Library
- Greenwood Public Schools Administration Building (also Old U.S. Post Office)
- Itta Bena City Hall
- Keesler Bridge
- Leflore County Courthouse in Greenwood designed by Ruben Harrison Hunt and completed in 1907

== Lincoln ==
- Brookhaven City Hall
- Brookhaven High School
- Cedar Hills Farms
- Haven Theater
- Henry Strong House
- Union Station
- Whitworth Female College in Brookhaven
  - Cooper Hall
  - Elizabeth Cottage
  - Enoch Hall
  - Johnson Institute
  - Whitworth College Laundry Building
  - Mary Jane Lampton Auditorium
  - Y.W.C.A. Building

== Lowndes ==
- Stephen D. Lee House (also Blewett-Harrison-Lee House)
- Caledonia Presbyterian Church
- Columbus City Fire Department Storage
- Columbus and Greenville Locomotive No. 178
- Columbus Bridge (also Old Highway 82 Bridge)
- Columbus City Hall
- Columbus Light and Water Building (also U.S. Post Office)
- Commercial Building
- Franklin Academy Elementary School
- Friendship Cemetery
- Lowndes County Courthouse
- McGahey Building
- Merchants and Farmers Bank
- Motley Slough Bridge
- Mississippi University for Women
  - Callaway Hall
  - Columbus Hall
  - Demonstration School
  - Eckford Building (also Eckford Nursery)
  - Eudora Welty Hall (also Fant Building)
  - Franklin Hall
  - Grossnickle Hall
  - Hastings-Simmons Hall
  - Mabel Fant Hall
  - Martin Hall
  - Mary Wilson House
  - McDevitt Hall
  - Orr Building
  - Painter Hall
  - Peyton Hall
  - Plant Engineering Building (also J. M. Barrow Memorial School)
  - Pohl Recreation Building (also Pohl Gymnasium)
  - Poindexter Hall
  - Reneau Hall
  - South Callaway Hall
  - Stovall House
  - W. N. Puckett House
  - Whitfield Hall (also Whitfield Auditorium)
- Police Department
- Old St. Paul's Episcopal Church Rectory (also Tennessee Williams House)
- Temple Heights (also Brownrigg-Harris-Kennebrew House)

== Madison ==
- Allison's Wells School of Arts and Crafts (also Conwell Hotel and Trolio Hotel), a former hotel building
- Canton Depot
- Canton High School
- Commercial Building (Canton, Mississippi)
- Flora Depot
- Haley Cemetery (also Puckshunubbee Site), home of the Choctaw Chief, burial mound, and cemetery
- James Restaurant Building
- Kirkwood Cemetery
- Little Sulm Building at 164 Center Street is a one-story commercial building in Canton it is part of the Canton Historic District
- Madison Airport World War II Aircraft Hangars (also Mississippi Institute of Aeronautics Aircraft Hangars)
- Madison County Chancery Court Building
- Old U.S. Post Office
- Madison County Courthouse
- Madison-Ridgeland Public School
  - Madison-Ridgeland School Gymnasium
- Molony's Building, brick commercial building appeared in film A Time to Kill
- Old Agency Road named for the Choctaw Indian Agency it was part of a Natchez Trace road system. Listed on the National Register of Historic Places.
- Sulm Building
- Brownee Hall, a gymnasium at Tougaloo College. Demolished in 2011.

== Marion ==
- Columbia High School
- Columbia Water Works
- John Ford House
- Marion County Jail
- Marion County Courthouse and Jail
- Rankin Company Buildings
  - Rankin Company Building (also Columbia Assembler, Inc.)
  - Rankin Grocery Warehouse
- Mississippi Industrial and Training School Superintendent's House, part of a reformatory school in Columbia, Mississippi

== Marshall ==
- Bessie Jones House, a Queen Anne Victorian architecture style home that was used as a boarding house for African Americans, especially for visitors to nearby Rust College and Mississippi Industrial College
- Bolling-Gatewood House (also Ida B. Wells Museum)
- Byhalia High School
- Chalmers Institute
- Church of the Yellow Fever Martyrs (also Old St. Joseph's Catholic Church)
- First Presbyterian Church
- Holly Springs City Hall
- Holly Springs Insurance Office
- Marshall County Courthouse
- Marshall County Historical Society and Museum (also Mississippi Synodical College)
- Mississippi Industrial College
  - Carnegie Auditorium
  - Catherine Hall
  - Davis Hall
  - Hammond Hall
  - Washington Hall
- Montrose
- Holly Springs Police Department
- Wall Doxey State Park
  - Wall Doxey Bath House
  - Wall Doxey State Park Cabin No. 3
  - Wall Doxey State Park Landscape Features
  - Wall Doxey State Park Lodge

== Monroe ==
- Aberdeen City Hall
- Amory City Hall
- Amory Regional Museum (also Gilmore Sanitarium)
- Athens Jail (also Monroe County Jail)
- Gregg-Hamilton House (also Mary Francis Gregg House)
- Aberdeen Depot
- Monroe County Courthouse
- National Guard Armory
- Reuben Davis House (also Sunset Hill)
- Rosemont (Mississippi) (also Hale House)
- The Magnolias (also W. B. Walker House and William Alfred Sykes House)
- Old U.S. Post Office and Federal Building
- W. W. Watkins House

== Montgomery ==
- Elk Horn School
- Immanuel Episcopal Church
- Winona Community House

== Neshoba ==
- Neshoba County Courthouse
- Philadelphia Depot
- Philadelphia Police Department (also Old U.S. Post Office)

== Newton ==
- Alabama and Vicksburg Railroad Depot
- Boler's Inn
- C. H. Boler School
- Lawrence Consolidated School
- Mcelroy-Hoye House
- Newton City Hall

== Noxubee ==
- Macon Elementary School
- Macon City Hall
- Noxubee County Courthouse
- Noxubee County Library (also Old Noxubee County Jail)
- Noxubee County Offices (also Old Noxubee County Jail of 1870)
- Running Water Creek Bridge
- Dancing Rabbit Creek Treaty Site

== Oktibbeha ==
- Starkville City Hall
- Greensboro Center (also Old Starkville High School)
- Magruder-Newsom House
- Mississippi State University
  - Bowen Hall
  - Carpenter Engineering Building
  - E. E. Cooley Building (also J. M. Stone Cotton Mill)
  - George Hall
  - Harned Hall
  - Herbert Hall
  - Hull Hall
  - Industrial Education Building
  - Lee Hall
  - Lloyd-Ricks Hall
  - Magruder Hall
  - McCain Engineering Building
  - Middleton ROTC Building
  - Montgomery Hall
  - Perry Cafeteria
  - Power Plant
  - Stennis Center (also Starkville Depot)
  - Y.M.C.A. Building
- Ritchie-Bunch House
- Sturgis School

== Panola ==
- Batesville Elementary School (also Old Batesville High School)
- Batesville Mounds
- Heflin House
- Popular Price Store
- St. Stephen's Episcopal Church

== Pearl River ==
- Bertie Rouse School (also East Side Public School)
- Buck Branch School
- McNeil Consolidated School (also Pearl River Central Elementary)
- Pearl River Community College
  - Pearl River Community College Alumni House
  - Huff Hall
  - Shivers Gymnasium
- Pearl River County Courthouse
- Picayune City Hall
- Crosby Arboretum Pinecone Pavilion

== Perry ==
- Old Augusta Townsite
- Runnelstown School Gymnasium
- Mahned Bridge (also Leaf River Bridge)
- Perry County Courthouse
- Old Perry County Jail

== Pike ==
- Bacot-Manning House
- Edgewood Park
  - Illinois Central Caboose No. 9384
  - McComb Edgewater Park Locomotive Engine and Refrigerator Car
- Fire Station No. 1
- Illinois Central Refrigerator Car No. 51000
- Magnolia Depot
- McComb City Hall
- McComb Depot
- McComb Public Library (also Old U.S. Post Office)
- Percy Quin State Park
  - Percy Quin State Park Manager's House
  - CCC Cabins
  - CCC Lodge
- Pike County Chancery Clerk's Office
- Pike County Courthouse
- White-Alford House

== Pontotoc ==
- Pontotoc Cemetery
- Pontotoc Community House
- Pontotoc County Courthouse
- Old U.S. Post Office
- ECRU School Vocational Building

== Prentiss ==
- Booneville Depot
- Old Burton School
- Old U.S. Post Office
- Civil War Battlefield Properties
  - Griffin-Davis Property
  - Bill Hardy Property
  - Hoyle Palmer Property
- Marietta Springs
- Old Masonic Hall (also Booneville Lodge No. 303)
- Prentiss County Courthouse

== Quitman ==
- Quitman County Courthouse

== Rankin ==
- Mississippi State Hospital Administration Building
- Armstrong Site
- Brandon Cemetery
- Pelahatchie City Hall and Masonic Hall
- Rankin County Courthouse
- Hebron Academy aka Rock Hill School

== Scott ==
- Lake Depot
- Roosevelt State Park

== Sharkey ==
- Leist Site A
- Sharkey County Courthouse

== Simpson ==
- Boswell Center (also Mississippi State Sanatorium)
- Simpson County Courthouse

== Smith ==
- Smith County Courthouse
- Taylorsville Signal Office and Watkins General Store

== Stone ==
- Harrison Hall located on the campus of Mississippi Gulf Coast Community College
- Stone County Courthouse
- Wiggins Depot

== Sunflower ==
- East Moorhead Elementary School Classroom Building
- Moorhead Depot
- Woodburn Bridge

== Tallahatchie ==
- Lamb-Fish Bridge
- Tallahatchie County Second District Courthouse

== Tate ==
- Northwest Mississippi Community College Administration Building
- Senatobia High School
- Tate County Courthouse, home to the Tate County Heritage Museum listed on the National Register of Historic Places

== Tippah ==
- Tippah County Confederate Monument
- Tippah County Courthouse
- Tippah County Jail

== Tishomingo ==
- Civil War Battlefield Properties
  - Chaffin Property
  - Childers Property
  - Hubbard Property
- Midway School
- Tishomingo County Courthouse
- Tishomingo State Park
  - Tishomingo State Park Cabin No. 1
  - Tishomingo State Park Cabin No. 2
  - Tishomingo State Park Cabin No. 3
  - Tishomingo State Park Cabin No. 4
  - Tishomingo State Park Cabin No. 5
  - Tishomingo State Park Cabin No. 6
  - Tishomingo State Park Comfort Station
  - Tishomingo State Park Group Cabin No. 1
  - Tishomingo State Park Group Cabin No. 2
  - Tishomingo State Park Group Cabin No. 3
  - Tishomingo State Park Group Cabin No. 5
  - Tishomingo State Park Group Cabin No. 6
  - Tishomingo State Park Lodge
  - Tishomingo State Park Main Office
  - Tishomingo State Park Picnic Pavilion
  - Tishomingo State Park Pool House and Swimming Pool
  - Tishomingo State Park Staff Residence
  - Tishomingo State Park Swinging Bridge
  - Tishomingo State Park Vehicular Bridge

== Tunica ==
- Hollywood Site
- Tunica School
- Tunica County Courthouse
- Tunica County Jail
- Tunica County Penal Farm Building

== Union ==
- Cine Theater
- Civil War Battlefield Properties
  - Hoyle Palmer Property
- Ingomar Mound
- Merle Norman Building
- New Albany City Hall
- Old U.S. Post Office
- Union County Courthouse

== Walthall ==
- Walthall County Courthouse

== Warren ==
- Balfour House
- Bethel African Methodist Episcopal Church
- Bowmar Avenue Elementary School
- Carr Junior High School
- Vicksburg Central Fire Station
- Cherry Street Bridge
- Christ Church
- Confederate Avenue Brick Arch Bridge
- Old Constitution Firehouse
- Vicksburg Fire Station No. 7
- Keystone Bridge Company Bridge (also Fairground Street Bridge)
- B'nai B'rith Club
- Levee Street Station
- McRae Bank (also Canizaro House)
- Old Mississippi River Bridge
- Planters Hall
  - Planters Hall Carriage House and Stable
  - Planters Hall Slave Quarters
- Vicksburg Sears Department Store
- Shlenker House (also Rig Perry House)
- Sisters of Mercy Convent (also St. Francis Xavier Complex and Southern Cultural Heritage Complex)
  - Old St. Francis Xavier School
  - Cobb House
  - O'Beirne Gymnasium
  - St. Francis Xavier Elementary School
- Vicksburg City Hall
- Vicksburg Public Library
- Old Warren County Courthouse
- Warren County Courthouse
- Warren County Jail
- William Bodley House (also Plain Gables)

== Washington ==
- Bessie J. Taylor Nurses Home
- Carrie Stern Elementary School
- E. E. Bass School
  - Old Greenville High School
  - E. E. Bass Junior High School
- Old Elks Club (also Greenville Lodge No. 148)
- Greenville Fire Station No. 1
- First National Bank Building
- Fort Nicholson
- Greenville City Hall
- Leland City Hall
- Levee Board Building
- Rattlesnake Bayoue and Levee
- Washington County Courthouse
- Wetherbee House
- Winterville Mounds

== Wayne ==
- Wayne County Courthouse
- Waynesboro Bridge
- Yellow Creek Bridge

== Webster ==
- Eupora School Administration Building
- Eupora Community House
- Eupora Depot
- Eupora School Gymnasium
- Webster County Courthouse, a new courthouse opened in 2018
- Webster County Jail
- Wood Home for Boys

== Wilkinson ==
- Ash Hardware Building
- Marsalis Building (also Centreville-Camp Van Dorm Museum)
- Wilkinson County Courthouse in Woodville, Mississippi designed by J. R. Gordon
- Wilkinson County Jail
- Wilkinson County Museum
- Woodville African American Cultural Center
- Woodville Depot
- Old Woodville Graded School
- Woodville Town Hall

== Winston ==
- Legion State Park
  - Legion State Park Lodge
- Old Masonic Hall (also Louisville Lodge No. 75)
- Strand Theater
- Winston County Library in Louisville, Mississippi

== Yalobusha ==
- Pine Valley School, on Highway 32 in the Pine Valley Community in Water Valley, Mississippi. John E. Phay photographed the school in 1955.
- Yalobusha County First District Courthouse
- Yalobusha County Second District Courthouse
- Yalobusha County Jail

== Yazoo ==
- Afro-American Sons and Daughters Hospital
- Water Valley Casey Jones Railroad Museum dedicated to legendary railroad engineer John Luther "Casey" Jones
- Hotel Lamar designed by C. H. Lindsley and built in 1924 and 1925.
- A. J. Oakes House
- Penny-Pepper House, a 19th-century Greek Revival architecture building
- Ricks Memorial Library
- Triangle Cultural Center, formerly Yazoo City Public School, designed by R. H. Hunt
- Yazoo City City Hall (1906) designed by R. H. Hunt
- Yazoo County Courthouse built in 1872

== See also ==
- National Register of Historic Places listings in Mississippi
- List of National Historic Landmarks in Mississippi
