= Stone County Courthouse =

Stone County Courthouse may refer to:

- Stone County Courthouse (Arkansas), Mountain View, Arkansas
- Stone County Courthouse (Mississippi), Wiggins, Mississippi
- Stone County Courthouse (Missouri), Galena, Missouri
