= Washington County Courthouse =

Washington County Courthouse may refer to:

- St. Stephens Courthouse, St. Stephens, Alabama, formerly the Washington County Courthouse
- Washington County Courthouse (Arkansas), Fayetteville, Arkansas
- Washington County Courthouse (Florida), Chipley, Florida
- Washington County Courthouse (Georgia), Sandersville, Georgia
- Washington County Courthouse (Idaho), Weiser, Idaho
- Washington County Courthouse (Illinois), Nashville, Illinois
- Washington County Courthouse (Indiana), Salem, Indiana
- Washington County Courthouse (Iowa), Washington, Iowa
- Washington County Courthouse (Kansas), Washington, Kansas
- Washington County Courthouse (Kentucky), Springfield, Kentucky
- Washington County Courthouse (Maine), Machias, Maine
- Washington County Courthouse (Maryland), Hagerstown, Maryland
- Washington County Courthouse (Minnesota), Stillwater, Minnesota
- Washington County Courthouse (Mississippi), Greenville, Mississippi
- Washington County Courthouse (Missouri), Potosi, Missouri
- Washington County Courthouse (Nebraska), Blair, Nebraska
- Washington County Courthouse (North Carolina), Plymouth, North Carolina
- Washington County Courthouse (Ohio), Marietta, Ohio
- Old Washington County Courthouse (Oklahoma), Bartlesville, Oklahoma
- Washington County Courthouse (Oregon), Hillsboro, Oregon
- Washington County Courthouse (Pennsylvania), Washington, Pennsylvania
- Washington County Courthouse (Rhode Island), South Kingstown, Rhode Island
- Washington County Courthouse (Texas), Brenham, Texas
- Old Washington County Courthouse (Utah), St. George, Utah
- Washington County Courthouse and Jail, West Bend, Wisconsin
