= John Cates =

John Cates may refer to:

- John Henry Cates (1896–1986), Canadian businessman and political figure in British Columbia
- John M. Cates (1878–1955), American college football player and coach
- John Cates (General Hospital), or Jagger Cates, a fictional character from the American soap opera General Hospital

== See also ==
- John F. Cates House, Mississippi
