= Carmel Presbyterian Church (Natchez, Mississippi) =

Historic church in Mississippi, United States

- U.S. National Register of Historic Places
- Mississippi Landmark
- Location within Mississippi Location within the United States
- Nearest city: Natchez, Mississippi
- Coordinates: 31°25′53″N 91°19′34″W
- Built: 1855
- Architectural style: Greek Revival
- NRHP reference No.: 85003441
- USMS No.: 001-NAT-5202-NR-ML

Significant dates
- Added to NRHP: October 31, 1985
- Designated USMS: March 21, 1996

Carmel Presbyterian Church in Natchez, Mississippi, also known as Carmel Church, was built in 1855. It was listed on the National Register of Historic Places in 1985 and designated a Mississippi Landmark in 1996.
