= Assembly Hall (Washington, Mississippi) =

- U.S. National Register of Historic Places
- Mississippi Landmark
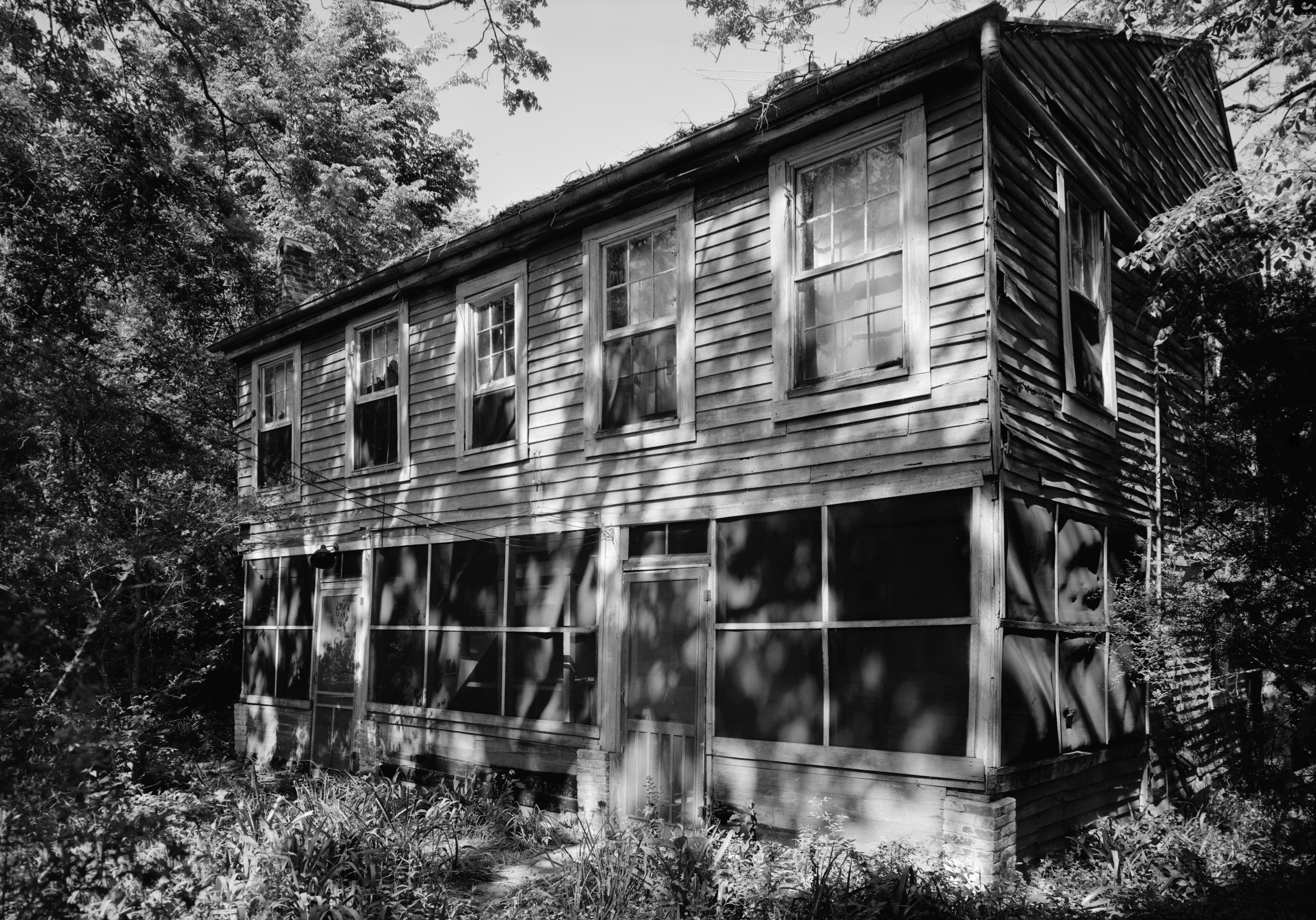
- Exterior of the hall

- Location within Mississippi Location within the United States
- Location: Assembly and Main Sts., Washington, Mississippi
- Coordinates: 31°34′45″N 91°17′52″W
- Built: 1808
- NRHP reference No.: 78001587
- USMS No.: 001-WSH-0006-NR-X

Significant dates
- Added to NRHP: April 19, 1978
- Designated USMS: March 21, 1995

Assembly Hall, also known as Serio House, de France House, and Fletcher's Tavern was a small tavern built in 1808 in Washington, Mississippi. It was listed on the National Register of Historic Places in 1978 and designated a Mississippi Landmark on March 21, 1995.

== History ==
In 1802 a political rivalry between the Democratic-Republican Party and the Federalist Party led to the relocation of Mississippi's then territorial capital. The Democrat-Republican government elected to move the capital from the Federalist-leaning Natchez, Mississippi to the more rural Washington, Mississippi; however, no capitol building was ever built. Meetings of the state's general assembly were held in the tavern, then owned by Charles de France. Upon admission of the state in 1817, the first state convention was held in the tavern, while all subsequent conventions before 1820 were held in Natchez.
