= Harrison Hall (Mississippi Gulf Coast Community College) =

Historic building located in Perkinston, Mississippi, United States

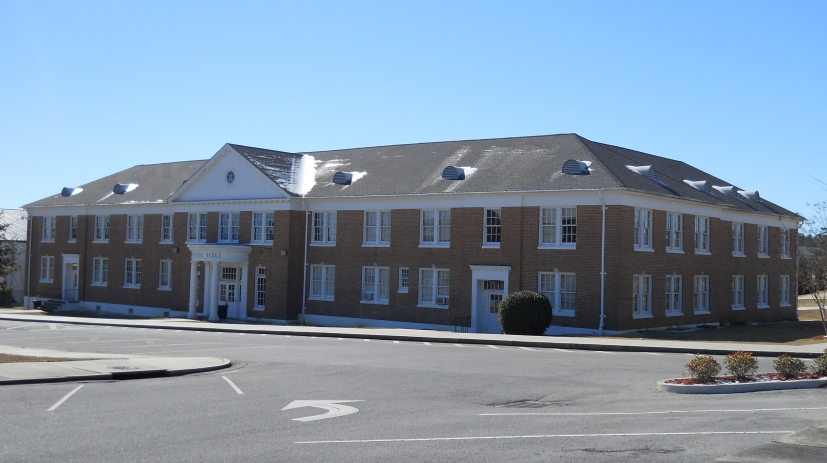
- Harrison Hall, January 2014

- Location within Mississippi
- 30.781931°N 89.142771°W
- Location: Mississippi Gulf Coast Community College, Perkinston, Mississippi

History
- Built: 1936-37

Site notes
- Architect(s): Smith, Vinson B., Jr. (1936)
- Restored: 1974, 2018
- Restored by: Eley Guild Hardy Architects (2018)
- Governing body: Mississippi

Mississippi Landmark
- Official name: Harrison Hall
- Designated: October 9, 2003
- Reference no.: 131-PRK-0106-ML

Harrison Hall is a former student dormitory located on the campus of Mississippi Gulf Coast Community College in Perkinston, Mississippi. It was constructed in 1936–37, and was designated a Mississippi Landmark in 2003. Following renovation in 2018, the building was repurposed to house administrative offices.

== History ==
Harrison Hall was designed by Gulfport architect Vinson Smith and was constructed in 1936-37 by building contractor Newton and Schmoll of Hattiesburg, Mississippi. The two-story building was renovated in 1974, and air conditioning was incorporated into the design.

From 1937 to 1983, Harrison Hall served as a dormitory for female students. In 1983, the building became a men's residence hall.

Following approval of remodeling plans by the Mississippi Department of Archives and History to insure historical integrity, renovation of the 81-year-old building was completed in 2018. After a dedication ceremony on April 18, 2018, Harrison Hall became the District Office Headquarters for Gulf Coast Community College.

=== Weddings ===
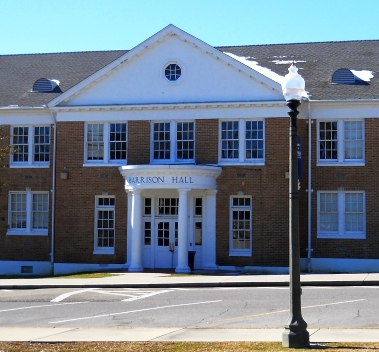
Main entrance to Harrison Hall

During the 46 years that Harrison Hall functioned as a women's residence hall, the lobby was often the focal point of "manless weddings". These were major social events on campus and were elaborate affairs, usually sponsored by student organizations, such as the YWCA. The "weddings" were attended by faculty, students, and out-of-town guests.
