= Bernheimer Building =

United States historic place

Coordinates: 31°57′36.06″N 90°59′1.98″W

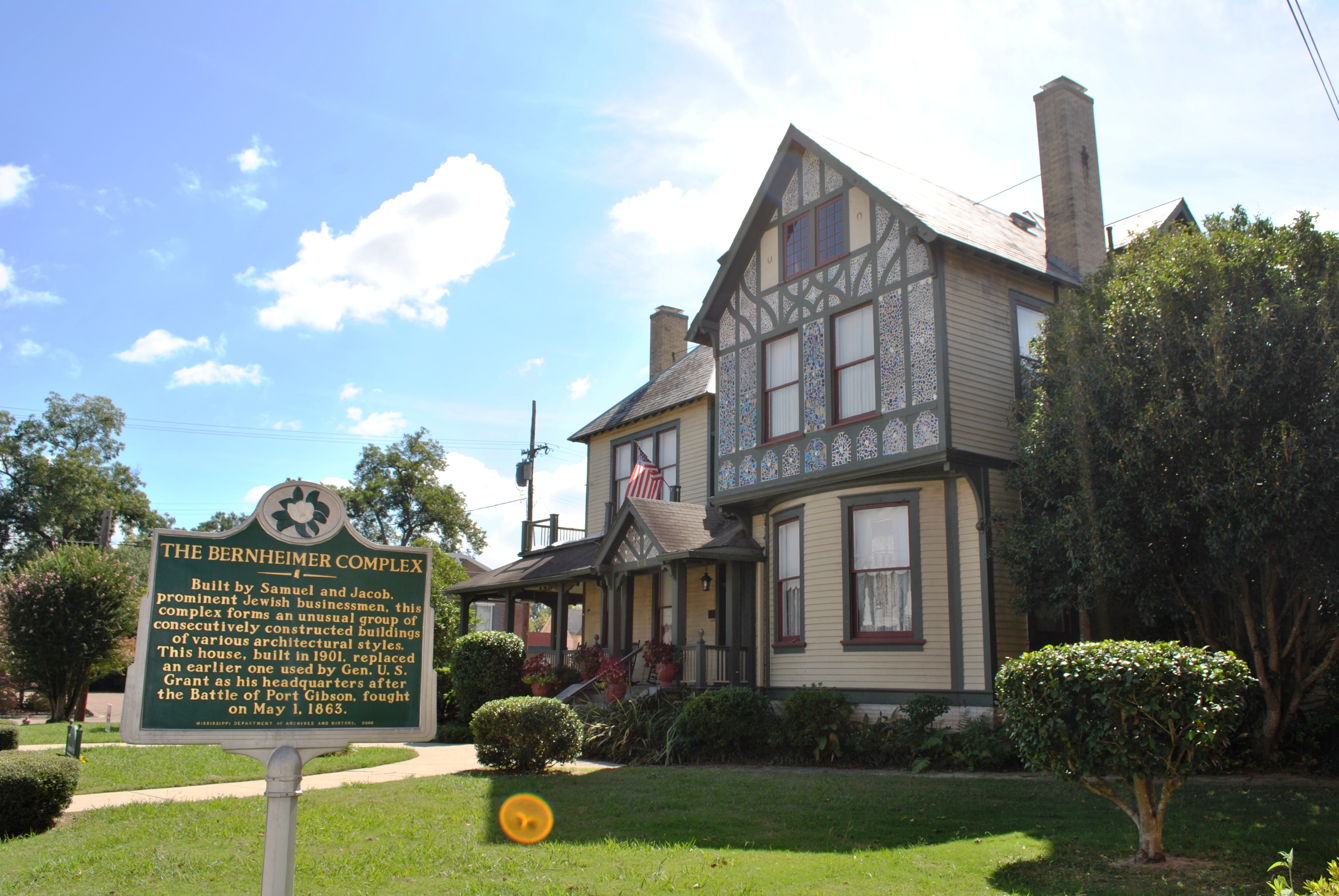
Bernheimer Building

The Bernheimer Building is an Italianate house in Port Gibson, Claiborne County, Mississippi. Built about 1872, it was designated a historic landmark on May 14, 2003. Businessmen Samuel and Jacob Bernheimer built a set of buildings of different architectural styles on the site of a previous house that was used during the Civil War as the headquarters of Gen. Ulysses S. Grant following the May 1, 1863 Battle of Port Gibson.

Located within the Port Gibson Historic District, it now operates as a bed and breakfast.

== See also ==
- List of Mississippi Landmarks
