= Pix Capri Theatre =

Pix/Capri Theatre
- Interactive map of the Pix/Capri Theatre area

General information
- Architectural style: Art Moderne
- Location: 3023 North State Street Jackson, Mississippi, United States
- Completed: 1939

Website
- https://caprimovies.com/

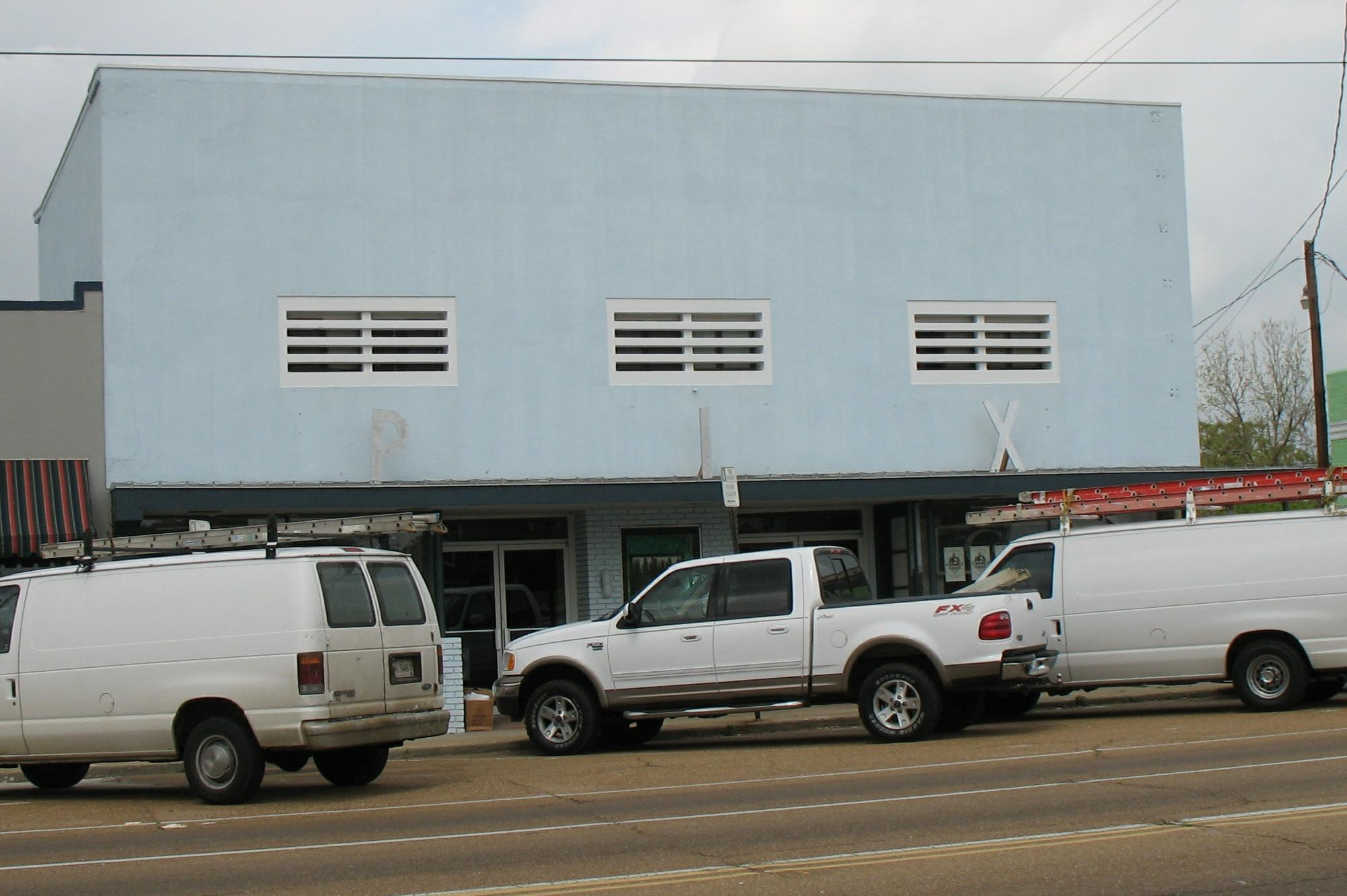
Image of the Pix Capri Theatre

The Pix/Capri Theatre is a historic movie theater in Jackson, Mississippi.

== History ==
It was built in 1939 as the Pix Theatre, on the historic US Highway 51, known as North State Street, in Jackson. In 1957, the Pix ceased its operations. In 1965, it was sold to Cinema Guild Inc. which reopened it as The Capri Theatre. While initially successful, the development of multiplex theatres in the metro Jackson market forced the Capri to begin relying on second run films in the late 1970s. By the early 1980's, the Capri had begun showing X-rated films in order to remain open to the public. By 1985, the Capri had closed.

The Pix/Capri was designed by a Jackson architect named James T. "Jack" Canizaro, who was also an investor in the project. On the 8th of August 2002, the Mississippi Department of Archives and History designated the building as a Mississippi Landmark. On the 10th of September 2014, the building was included in the National Register as a contributing element to the Downtown Fondren Historic District.

In 2005, after twenty years of sitting vacant, the Capri reopened as a venue for live music, independent films, and live theater performances. Various groups made efforts to raise money for its restoration without success. In 2012, plans were announced to develop the building into a mixed-use venue, including a multiscreen dinner theater.

In 2019, a $13 million development in the Fondren neighborhood of Jackson was announced. These developments include a Tiki bar, a bowling alley, restaurants, and the renovations of the Capri theater. In January 2022, alongside its new Tiki bar and bowling alley, the Capri Theatre opened to the public with its first movie showing of 'Spider-Man: No Way Home'. The redeveloped theatre is said to house a 40-foot screen, Dolby 7.1 sound, a state-of-the-art digital laser projection system, 178 reclining lounge seats, fold-out tables for food and drinks, and a full-service food and cocktail menu.
