= Okolona Carnegie Library =

Public library

Coordinates: 34°00′16″N 88°45′03″W

Okolona Carnegie Library is a historic public library in Okolona, Mississippi. It received funding as a Carnegie Library and was designed by John Gaisford of Memphis. It opened in 1915. The grounds formerly included a park with a wading pool. The library is at 321 West Main Street.

The first librarian was May McDowell McGeHee who graduated the same year from high-school. The Okolona Carnegie Library became part of the Dixie Regional System in 1977. A new addition was added in 1986 tripling shelf space and adding a conference room. The library is a Mississippi Landmark.

It originally had one large room on the ground floor and a basement with four small rooms and two bathrooms. A "Story Labyrinth" is in front of the library. In 2022, it was a finalist for further renovations.

== See also ==
- List of Carnegie libraries in Mississippi
- National Register of Historic Places listings in Chickasaw County, Mississippi
