= Grenada Masonic Temple =

- U.S. National Register of Historic Places
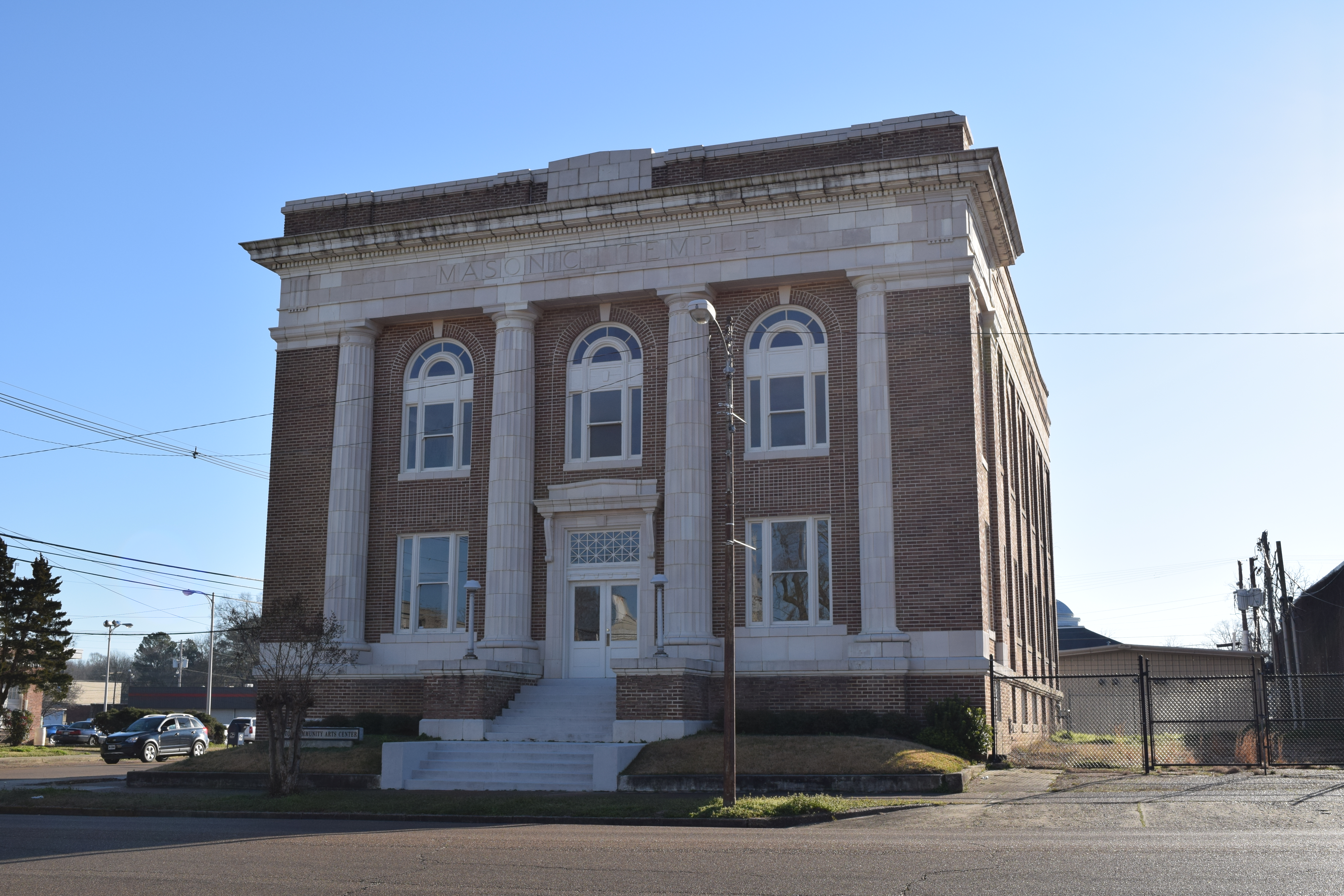
- Grenada Masonic Temple in 2019

- Location within Mississippi Location within the United States
- Location: 210 S. Main St., Grenada, Mississippi
- Coordinates: 33°46′58″N 89°48′9″W
- Area: 0.3 acres (0.12 ha)
- Built: 1925
- Architectural style: Classical Revival
- MPS: Grenada MRA
- NRHP reference No.: 87002307
- Added to NRHP: January 20, 1988

The Masonic Temple in Grenada, Mississippi is a Classical Revival building from 1925. It was listed on the National Register of Historic Places in 1988.

It was designated a Mississippi Landmark in 2007.

The local Masonic lodge (Grenada Lodge No. 31) no longer meets in the building.

The City of Grenada purchased the building in 2007 thanks to a private donation of former State Senator John Keeton and his wife. Margaret.
