= West Point Colored High School =

Segregated school in Mississippi, United States

Location
- 425 Fifth Street; West Point, Clay County, Mississippi; United States
- 33.6111°N 88.6445°W

Information
- Other names: Fifth Street School; Northside School

West Point Colored High School is a historic school building and former school for African American students at 425 Fifth Street in West Point, Mississippi. It is listed as a Mississippi Landmark.

== History ==
It was designed by E L. Malvaney of Jackson, Mississippi and constructed in 1946.

It is documented as also having been known as Fifth Street School and Northside School. After desegregation, it was used as Northside School.

In 2011 and 2016, the Mississippi Department of Archives and History awarded money for roof work at the school building.

== See also ==
- National Register of Historic Places listings in Clay County, Mississippi
- West Point High School (Mississippi)
