= Ingomar Mound =

Ingomar Mounds
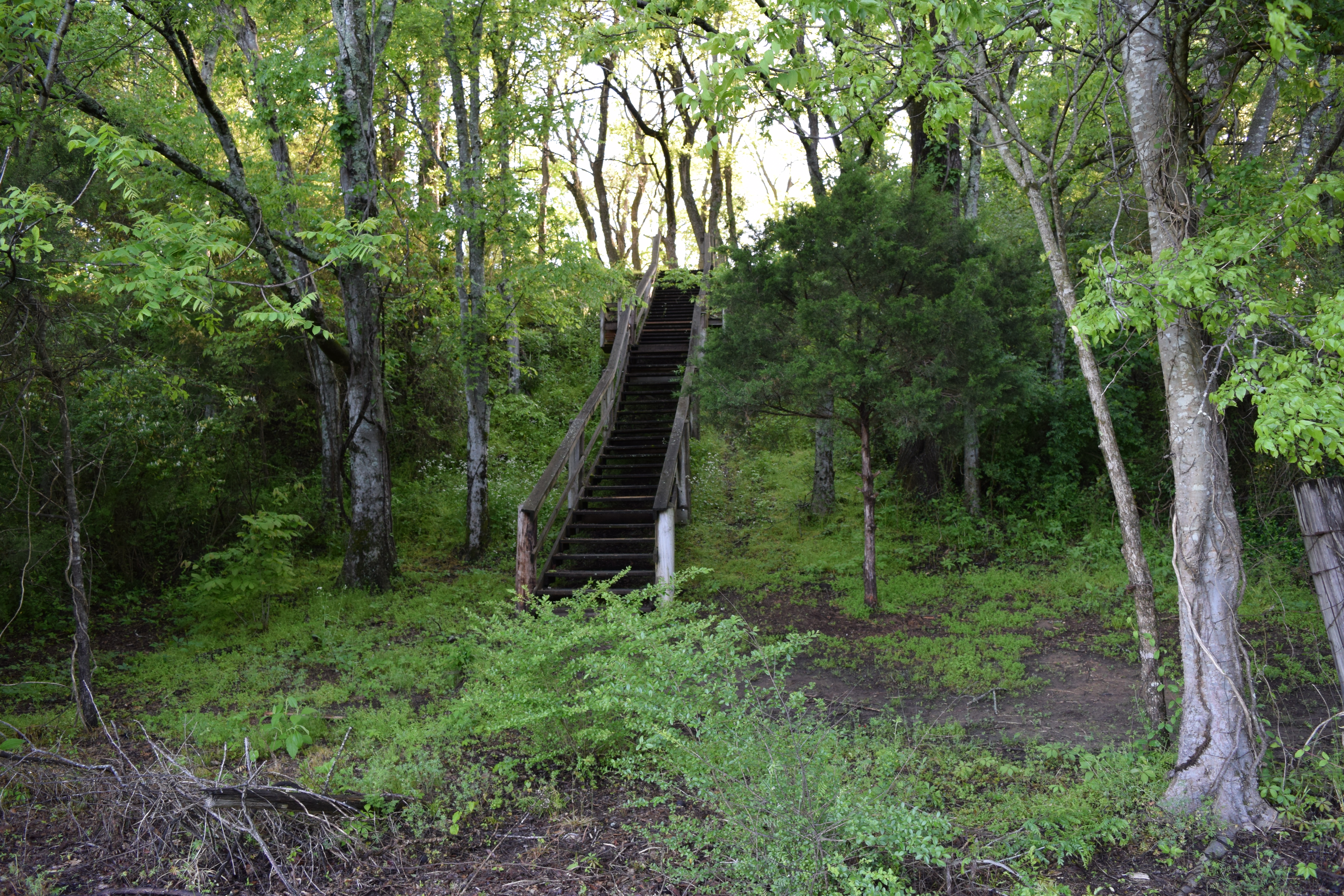
- Stairs leading up Ingomar Mound

- Location within Mississippi today
- 34°23′50.1″N 89°02′57.7″W
- Cultures: Woodland period, Mississippian culture
- Location: Ingomar, Mississippi, Union County, Mississippi, USA
- Region: Union County, Mississippi

History
- Built: 200 AD
- Abandoned: 1800 AD

Site notes
- Architectural style: platform mound
- Ingomar Mound
- U.S. National Register of Historic Places
- Mississippi Landmark
- NRHP reference No.: 78001632

Significant dates
- Added to NRHP: June 9, 1978
- Designated USMS: September 11, 2002

Ingomar Mound is the large central mound and sole remaining feature of a ceremonial center of the late Mississippian Period of cultural development. A total of 13 mounds composing the group have been excavated. Believed to be a temple mound, Ingomar is the only structure of the group not overrun by later agriculture and development, thus generally undisturbed when archeologists began studying the complex of mounds. At least one of the mounds in the group was a flat-topped burial mound. Ingomar is one of the largest such mounds found in the Southeast. Ingomar is important because of its potential for the testing of theories about aboriginal settlement pattern hypotheses, such as the Clay's system environments theory and Steponaitis' spatial efficiency theory

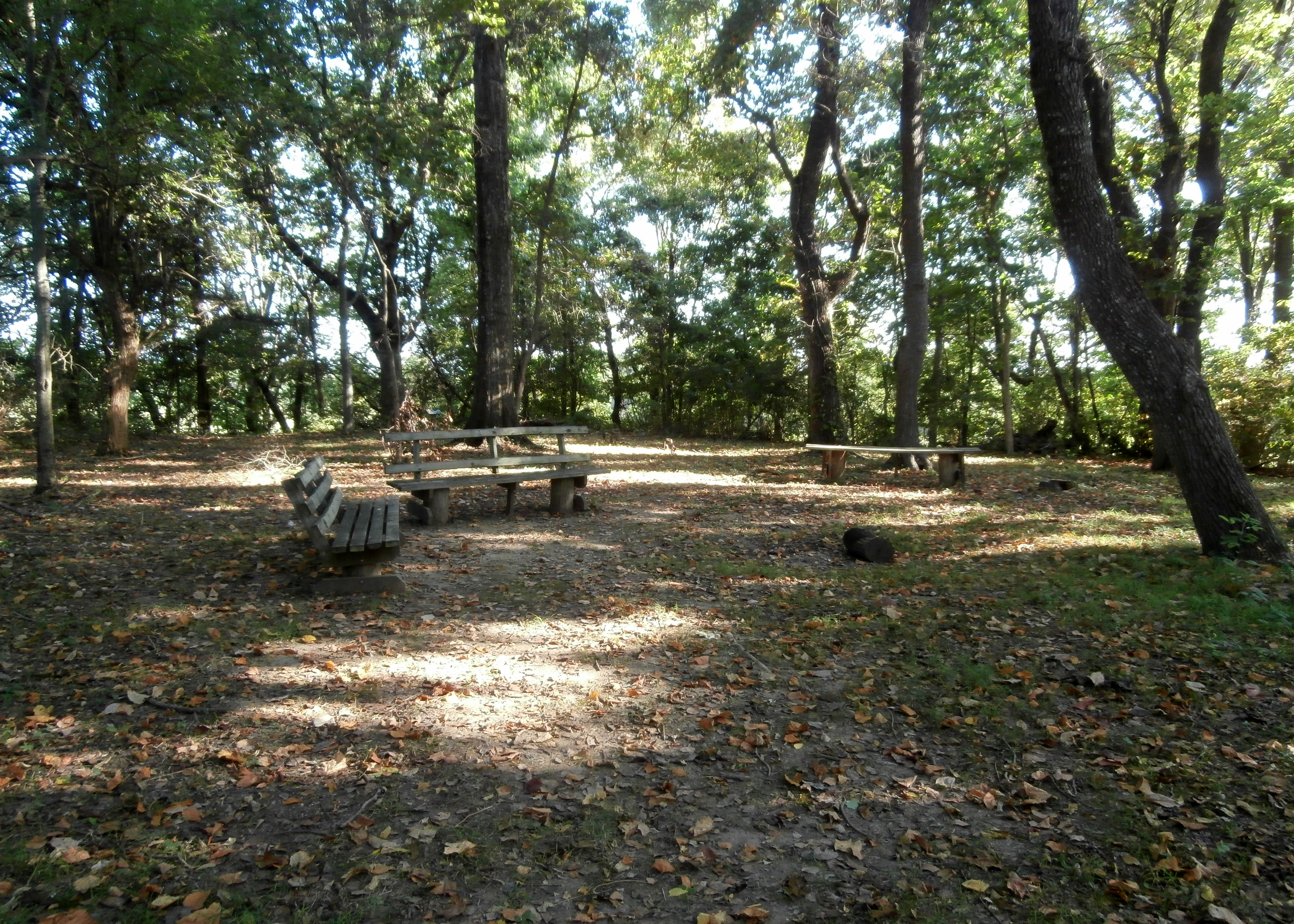
Camp area on top of Ingomar Mound
