= Old Masonic Hall (Booneville, Mississippi) =

Historic building in Booneville, Mississippi, United States

Coordinates: 34.656564°N 88.563304°W

- Location: 104 Main Street, North, Booneville, Mississippi

Mississippi Landmark
- Designated: 1999

The Old Masonic Hall in Booneville, Mississippi, is a historic building that was designated a Mississippi Landmark in 1999. There is also an Old Masonic Hall in Louisville, Mississippi, also known as Community House, and as Chamber of Commerce, is a historic building built in 1851.
