= Motley Slough Bridge =

- U.S. National Register of Historic Places
- Mississippi Landmark

- Location within Mississippi Location within the United States
- Coordinates: 33.43923°N 88.50777°W
- Built: 1920
- Architectural style: Pratt pony truss
- MPS: Historic Bridges of Mississippi TR
- NRHP reference No.: 88002405

Significant dates
- Added to NRHP: November 16, 1988
- Designated USMS: August 4, 1987

Motley Slough Bridge is a small bridge designated a Mississippi Landmark and on the U.S. National Register of Historic Places, located in Lowndes County, Mississippi. It is a single span iron Pratt pony truss bridge built in 1920. It "embodies the distinctive characteristics of a type, period or method of construction.".

The bridge is located about 1/4 mile southwest of US Route 45 on Shaeffers Chapel Road. The eastern approach is overseen by the Motley Slough Dragon. Recent construction on US 45 involves rerouting that section of Shaeffers Chapel Road.
