= Boler's Inn =

- U.S. National Register of Historic Places
- U.S. Historic district
- Mississippi Landmark
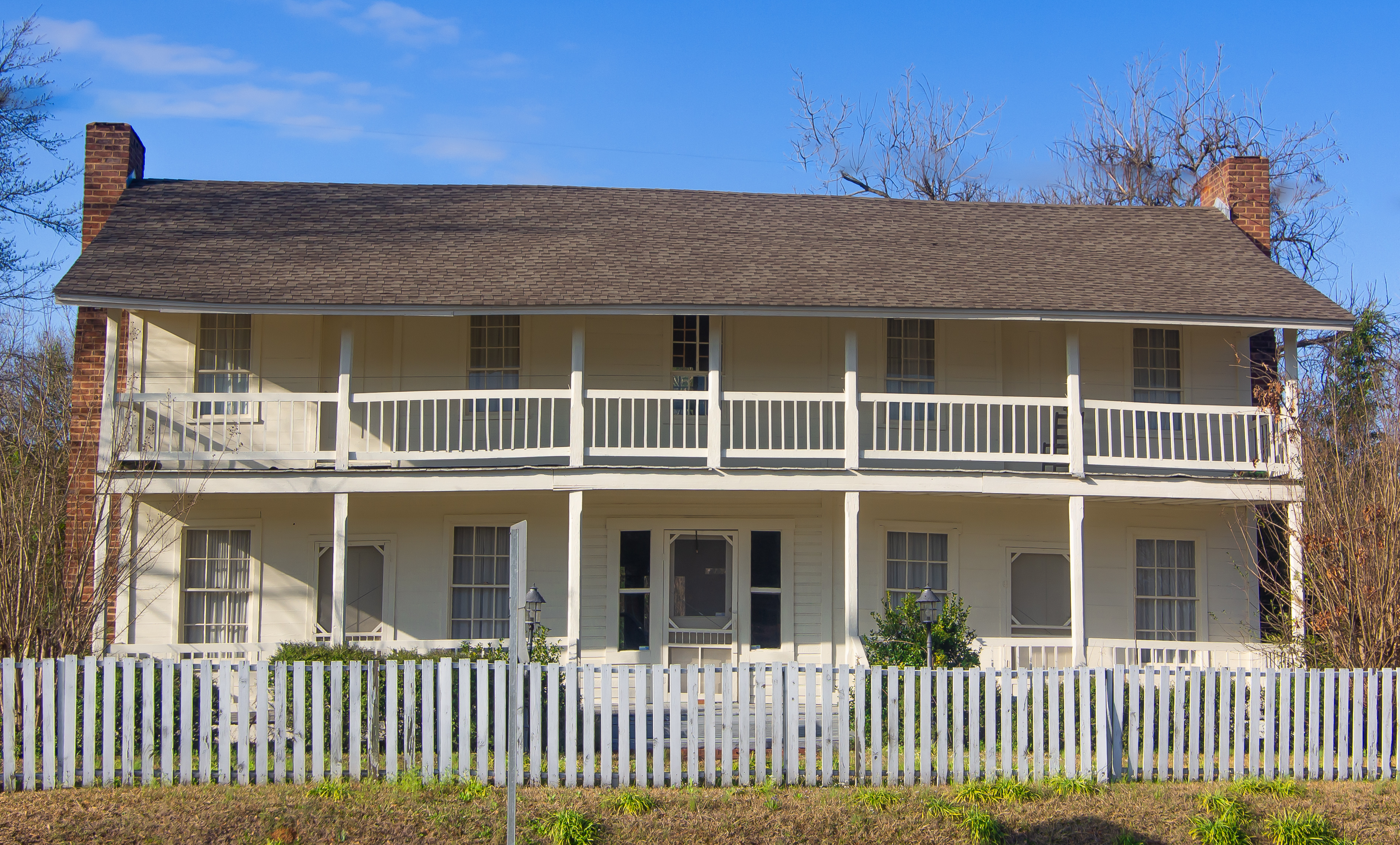
- Boler's Inn

- Location within Mississippi Location within the United States
- Location: Newton County, Mississippi, U.S.
- Coordinates: 32°34′22″N 89°7′17″W
- Built: c.1835
- Architectural style: Greek Revival
- NRHP reference No.: 99000838

Significant dates
- Added to NRHP: August 2, 1999
- Designated USMS: December 21, 2000

Boler's Inn is a historic building located on Jackson Road in Union, Newton County, Mississippi, United States. It is one of the oldest surviving buildings in east-central Mississippi.

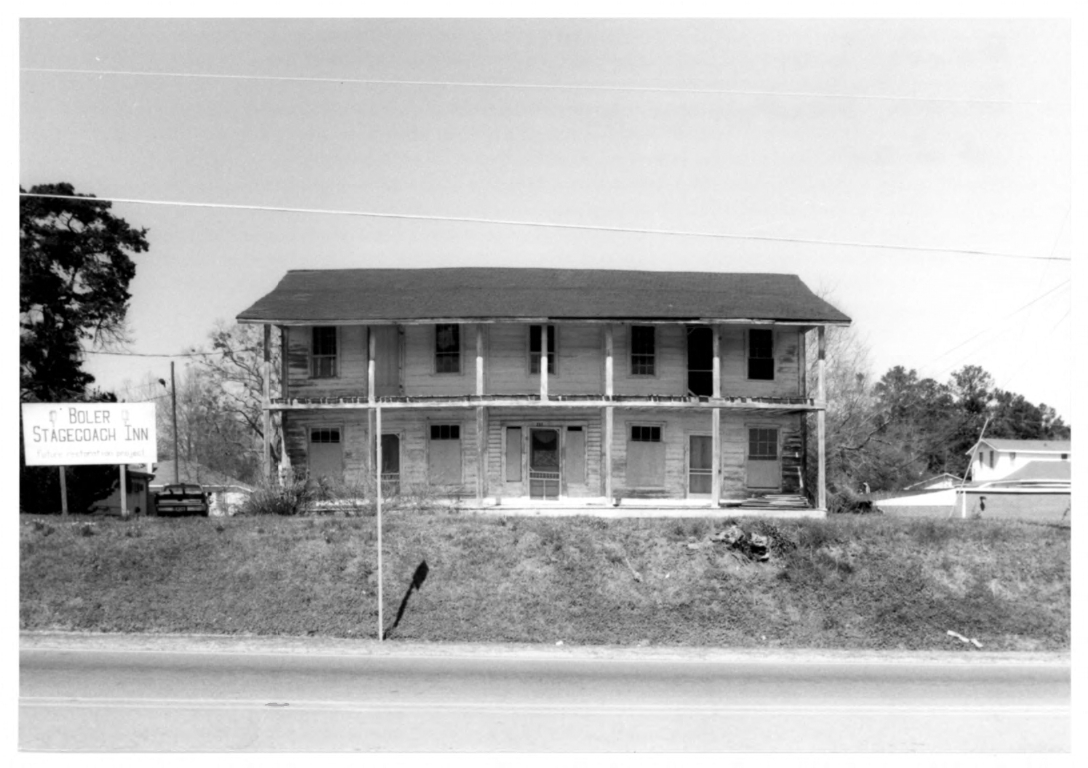
Boler's Inn in 1999.

== History ==
Boler's Inn was constructed around 1835 by Wesley Boler, a prominent figure in the area. It served as a stagecoach stop and hotel along the Jackson to Montgomery road. During the American Civil War, it played a significant role, with General William T. Sherman spending a night there during his raid in February 1864.

Boler's Inn was designated a Mississippi Landmark on December 21, 2000. It is recognized for its historical and architectural significance.

== Architecture ==
The inn is a two-story wood-frame building with Greek Revival influences. Originally featuring a dog-trot open center, it was later enclosed. The front porch boasts chamfered columns, and the interior retains its wood floors, walls, and ceilings.
