= Masonic Hall (Carrollton, Mississippi) =

Landmark building in Carrollton, Mississippi, United States

Coordinates: 33°30′32″N 89°55′11″W

- Location: 715 Lexington Street, Carrollton, Mississippi
- Built: 1899

Mississippi Landmark
- Designated: 2002

The Old Masonic Hall in Carrollton, Mississippi, also known as Carrollton Lodge No. 36, is a historic building built in 1899 that was designated a Mississippi Landmark in 2002.

The Carrollton Masonic Lodge #36 was chartered in 1838. The building was built in 1899.
