= Old Municipal Building and Masonic Hall =

Historic building in Shelby, Mississippi, United States

Coordinates: 33.949890°N 90.767641°W

- Location: 300 3rd Avenue, Shelby, Mississippi
- Built: 1935

Mississippi Landmark
- Designated: 2000

The Old Municipal Building and Masonic Hall in Shelby, Mississippi is a historic building built in 1935 that was designated a Mississippi Landmark in 2000.

A two-story brick commercial-type building, originally constructed as a meeting hall for Shelby Lodge No. 478 (a local Masonic Lodge which no longer exists), it now houses the Shelby Police Department.
