= Pelahatchie City Hall and Masonic Hall =

Historic building in Pelahatchie, Mississippi, United States

- Location: 2nd St. between Brooks & Goforth, Pelahatchie, Mississippi
- Coordinates: 32.31343°N 89.79846°W

Mississippi Landmark
- Designated: 2007

The Pelahatchie City Hall and Masonic Hall in Pelahatchie, Mississippi is a historic building that was designated a Mississippi Landmark in 2007.

The ground floor of the building serves as the Pelahatchie City Hall. The second floor serves as a meeting hall for Pelahatchie Lodge No. 276, F&AM (the local Masonic lodge).
