= Masonic Temple (Hattiesburg, Mississippi) =

Historic building in Hattiesburg, Mississippi, United States

Coordinates: 31°19′39.4″N 89°17′30.5″W

Old Masonic Hall
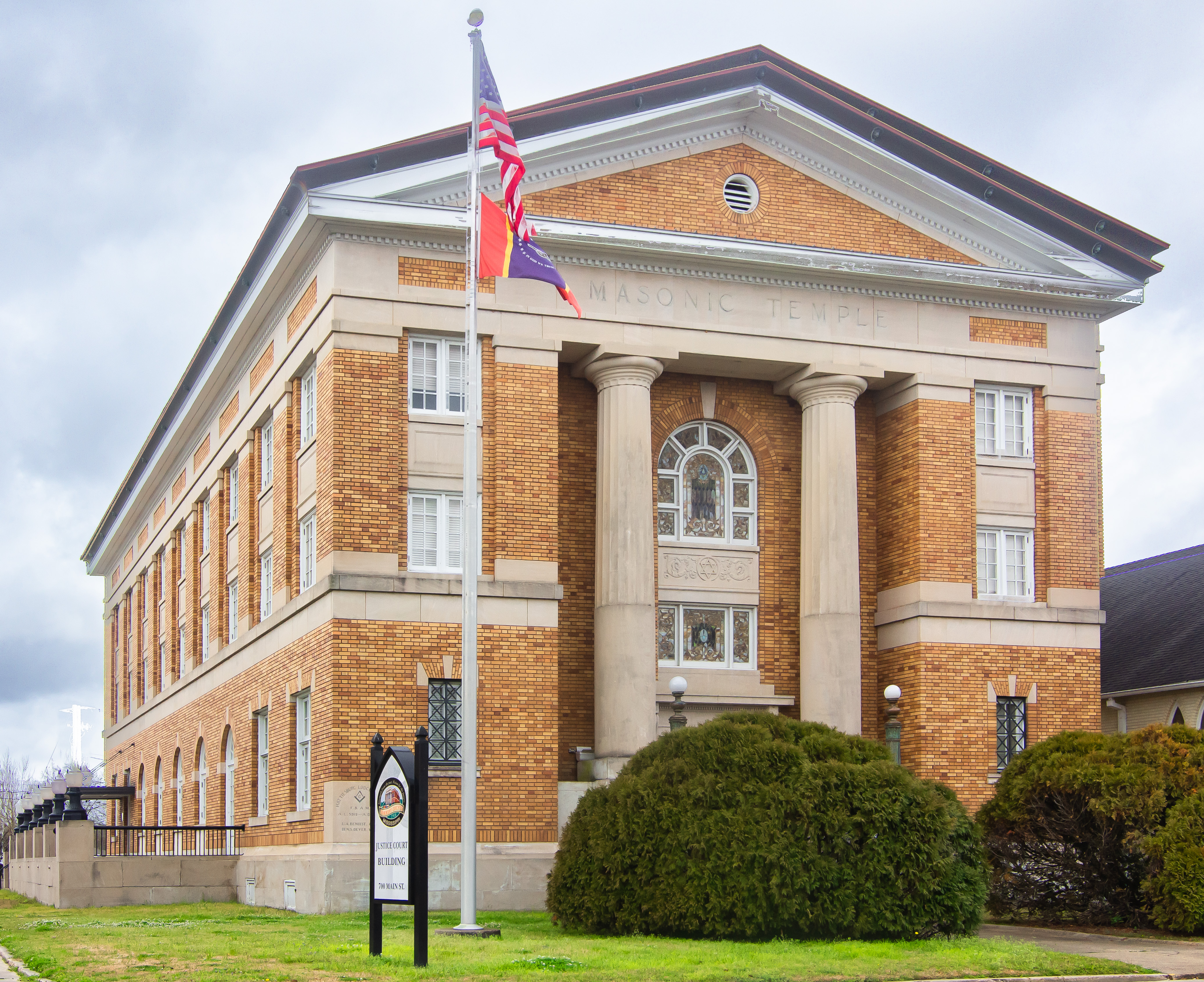
- Location: 700 Main Street, Hattiesburg, Mississippi

Mississippi Landmark
- Designated: 2003

The Masonic Temple in Hattiesburg, Mississippi, is a historic building that was designated a Mississippi Landmark in 2003.

Originally constructed as a meeting hall for Hattiesburg Lodge 397, the building was sold when the lodge moved to a new location (on Eatonville Road). No Masonic lodges currently meet in the building.
