= Magnolia Hotel (Biloxi, Mississippi) =

- U.S. National Register of Historic Places
- Mississippi Landmark
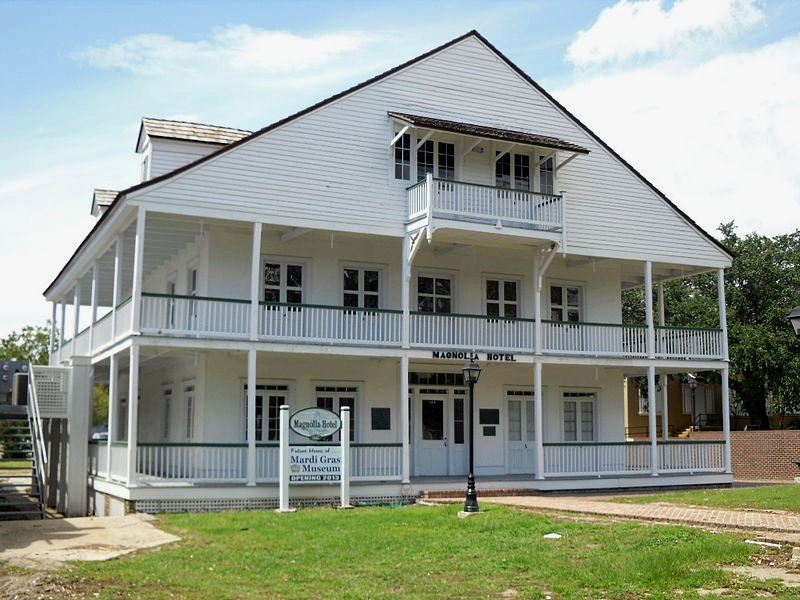
- Magnolia Hotel 2012

- Location within Mississippi Location within the United States
- Location: 119 Rue Magnolia, Biloxi, Mississippi
- Coordinates: 30°23′41″N 88°53′22″W
- Built: 1847
- Restored: 1973
- NRHP reference No.: 73001013
- USMS No.: 047-BLX-0470-NR-ML

Significant dates
- Added to NRHP: March 14, 1973
- Designated USMS: October 11, 1985

The Magnolia Hotel was built in 1847 to serve as a lodging establishment. It is thought to be the oldest surviving hotel on the Mississippi Gulf Coast. The hotel was added to the National Register of Historic Places in 1973, and was designated a Mississippi Landmark in 1985.

== History ==
The Magnolia Hotel was constructed for John Hahn, who operated a coffeehouse in New Orleans. Originally, the hotel was a 2 1/2-story, wood-frame building with plastered exterior walls that measured 54 feet (16 m) on each side. The exterior walls were recessed 7 feet (2.1 m). A central hall extended front to back on both floors. The first floor had paired rooms on either side of the hall; the second floor hall had six rooms on either side. The hotel was originally located near the beach, facing south, toward the Mississippi Sound.

John Hahn died in 1848, but his wife operated the hotel to accommodate guests from New Orleans, because Biloxi had become a popular resort destination on the Gulf Coast. After the American Civil War, the hotel became a destination for winter guests from northern states, who were attracted by the mild climate. The hotel was operated by descendants of John Hahn through World War II, when it closed.

In 1969, Hurricane Camille inflicted considerable damage to the building. Because of the hotel's historical significance, the city of Biloxi acquired the building in 1972, and moved it to a higher elevation, approximately 100 yards (91 m) north of its original location. The structure was oriented to face east and was restored. Additional restoration was required to repair damage caused by Hurricane Katrina in 2005.

== Biloxi Mardi Gras Museum ==
As of 2013, the building was being used as Biloxi's Mardi Gras Museum. In addition to displays of memorabilia from carnival celebrations, the museum documents the history of the Magnolia Hotel.
