= W.J. Quarles House and Cottage =

Historic house in Mississippi, United States

- W.J. Quarles House
- U.S. National Register of Historic Places
- Mississippi Landmark
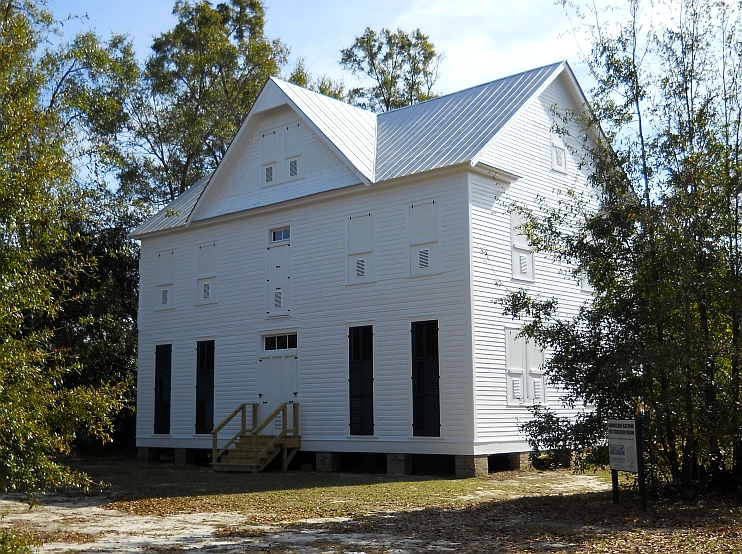
- W.J. Quarles House, January 2013

- Location within Mississippi Location within the United States
- Location: 181 East Old Pass Road (Moved from 120/122 East Railroad Street), Long Beach, Mississippi
- Coordinates: 30°21′09″N 89°09′07″W
- Built: 1892
- Architectural style: Vernacular
- NRHP reference No.: 80002244
- USMS No.: 047-LNG-0001-NR-MVD-ML

Significant dates
- Added to NRHP: October 16, 1980
- Designated USMS: September 7, 2012

The W.J. Quarles House, also known as Greenvale, is a historic residence in Long Beach, Mississippi. Constructed in 1892, the structure was added to the National Register of Historic Places in 1980, and was designated a Mississippi Landmark in 2012.

== History ==
William James Quarles was a rural school teacher from Tennessee who settled in the Long Beach community of south Mississippi in 1884. The Quarles House was constructed in 1892 as a five-bay, wood-frame, two-story residence with clapboard outer walls. The structure was two rooms deep and sat on a foundation of brick piers with one interior chimney. The house was the residence of W.J. Quarles until 1924.

Battered by a century of hurricanes, the Quarles House was severely damaged by Hurricane Camille in 1969. Through the latter half of the 20th century, the house was vacant and sealed. In 2003, the Quarles House was listed as one of the ten most endangered historic places in Mississippi by the Mississippi Heritage Trust.

Because the house was located on property that was highly prized for commercial development in Long Beach, the owner sought permission from the keeper of the National Register of Historic Places to move the structure approximately 400 feet (120 meters) northeast, near the Quarles Family Cemetery. The move was approved in 2012. Following the move, restoration of the structure was initiated to achieve historical accuracy.

=== Cottage ===
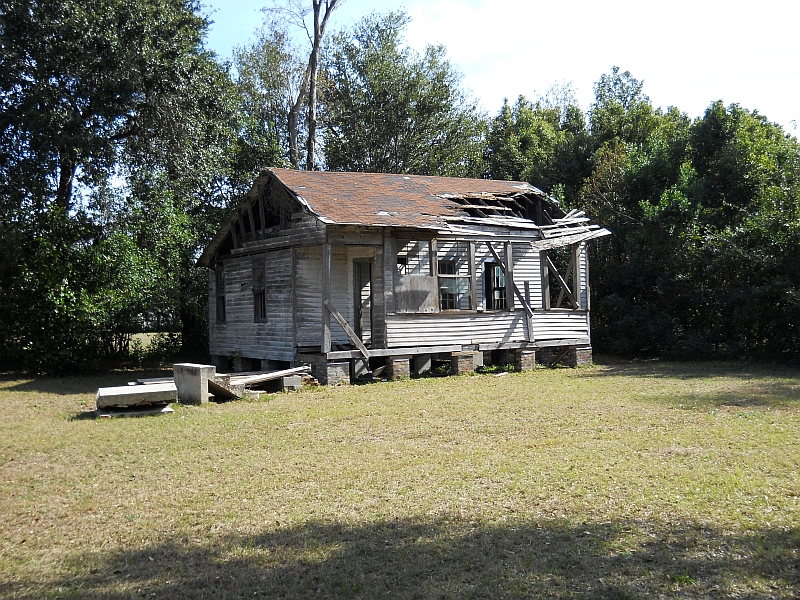
W.J. Quarles Cottage, January 2013

When the Quarles house was added to the National Register of Historic Places in 1980, there was a one-story, two-room, clapboard cottage located just east of the main house. In 1884, the cottage was originally part of a one-story house where the Quarles family resided while their new 2-story home was under construction. In the 1930s, the 1-story house was torn down, leaving the cottage.
