= Amite Female Seminary =

American Historic Place and Mississippi Landmark

- U.S. National Register of Historic Places
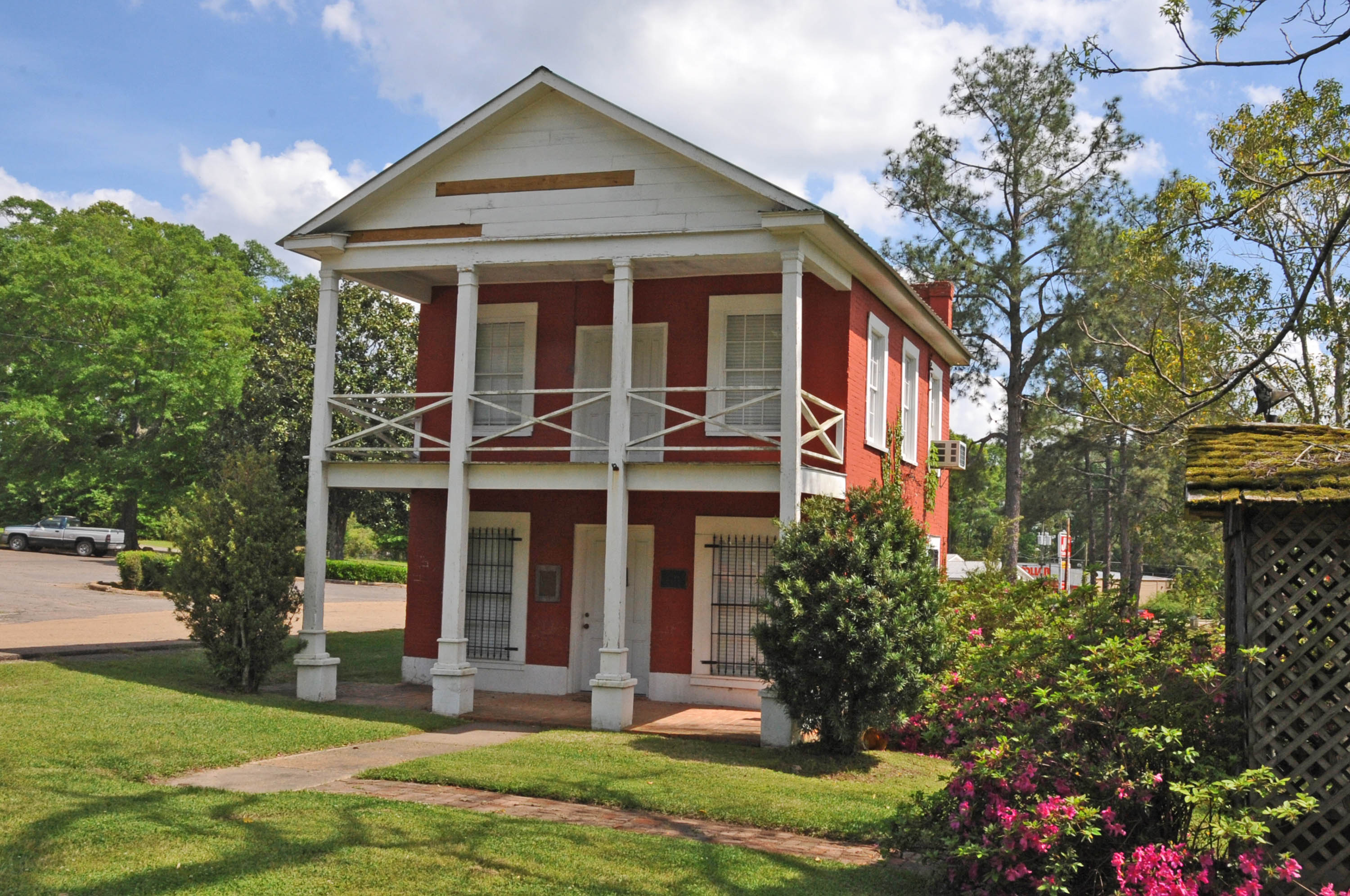
- A surviving building from the school

- Location within Mississippi
- Location: MS 569, Liberty, Mississippi
- Coordinates: 31°09′37″N 90°48′20″W
- Area: less than one acre
- Built: 1853
- Architectural style: Greek Revival, Federal, Adamesque
- NRHP reference No.: 80002200
- Added to NRHP: April 17, 1980

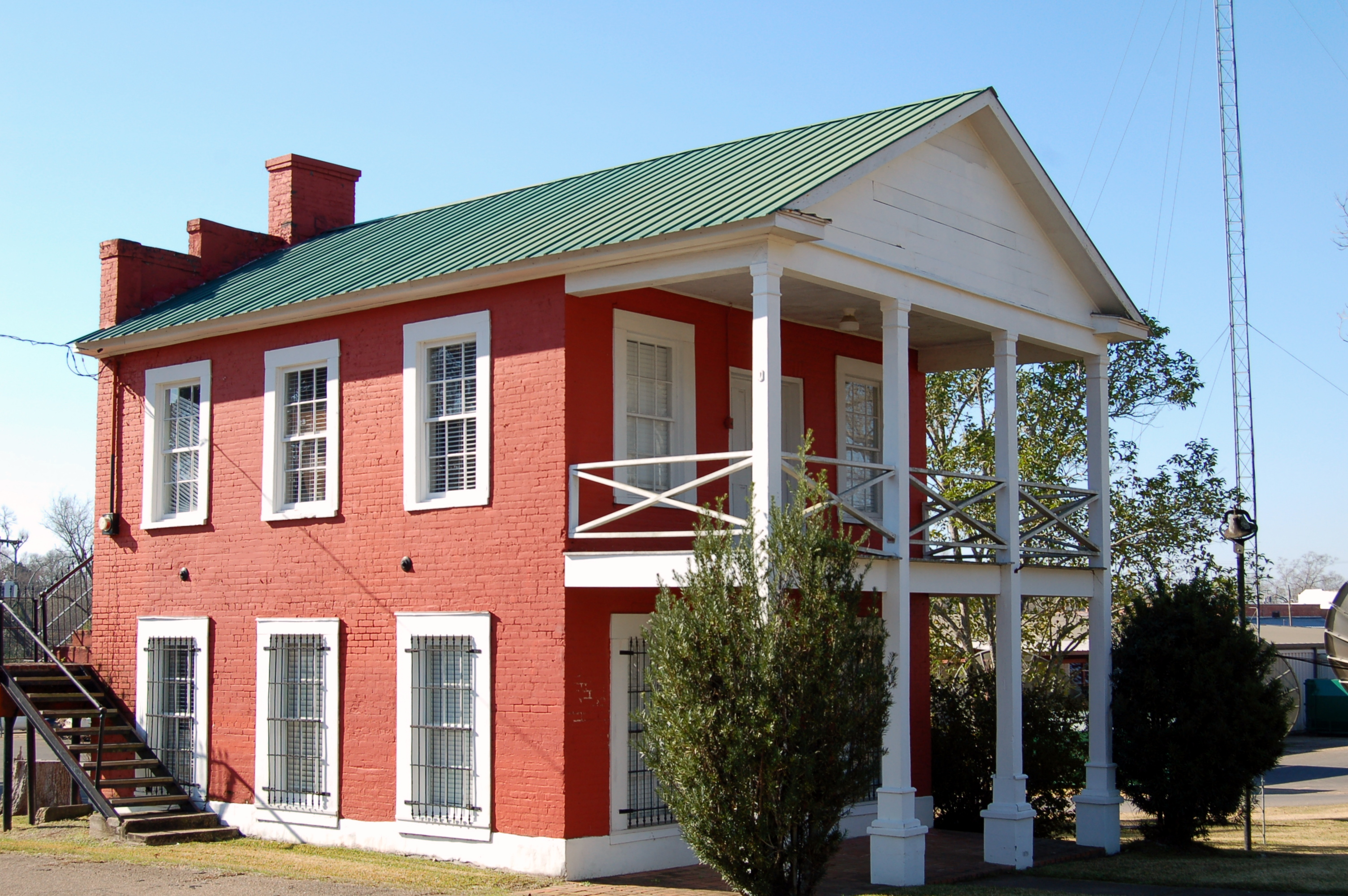

The Amite Female Seminary was a seminary in Liberty, Mississippi in Amite County. One building survives and is a Mississippi Landmark listed on the National Register of Historic Places.

The seminary, founded in 1853, was burned by Union troops in 1863 but its music building survived and is now a museum. Amite Female Seminary was founded in 1853 by Rev. Milton S. Shirk. It taught music, literature, history, mathematics, "modern" languages, philosophy, science and physical education. It closed during the American Civil War and burned. Its board was appointed by the Mississippi Baptist Association.

William Cecil Duncan spoke at the school July 7, 1858. American journalist and poet Pearl Rivers attended the school.

The historic integrity of the building was reduced somewhat by repairs done during 1979, but it was still accepted for listing on the National Register in 1980.

Its National Register nomination stated:

The building retains its two major architectural features--the Greek Revival double gallery on the front facade and the stepped-gable roof parapet on the rear elevation. The stepped gable is an especially interesting Adamesque detail associated also with two residences in Amite County constructed in the same 10-year period: the Talbert-Cassels House and the Winston Wilkinson House.

Subsequently to that writing, those two houses were also National Register-listed, the former in 1980 and the latter in 1984.
