= Old Masonic Hall (Hazlehurst, Mississippi) =

Historic building in Hazlehurst, Mississippi, United States

Coordinates: 31.858216°N 90.390548°W

Masonic Hall
- Location: Hazlehurst, Mississippi

Mississippi Landmark
- Designated: 2002

The Old Masonic Hall in Hazlehurst, Mississippi, also known as Golden Square Lodge No. 88, Prince Hall Affiliation, is a historic building that was designated a Mississippi Landmark in 2002.

While historically a meeting place for African American Freemasons, today no Masonic lodges meet in the building. Neither of the Prince Hall Grand Lodges in Mississippi lists a "Golden Square Lodge No. 88" on their rosters.
