= Stephen D. Lee House =

Historic house in Mississippi, United States

- S. D. Lee House
- U.S. National Register of Historic Places
- Mississippi Landmark
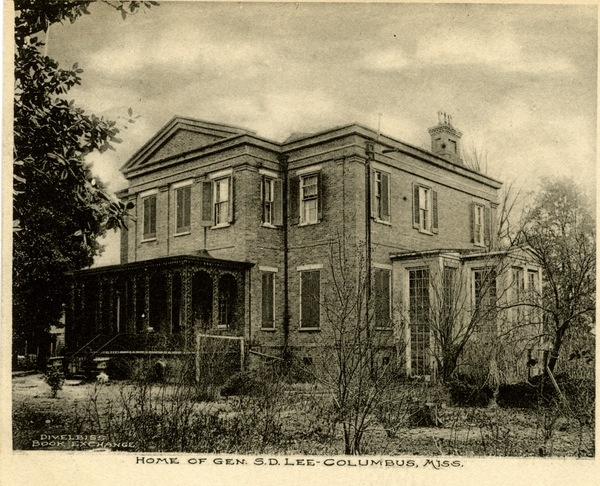
- Stephen D. Lee House in the early 1900s

- Location within Mississippi Location within the United States
- Location: 314 N. 7th St., Columbus, Mississippi
- Coordinates: 33°29′54″N 88°25′32″W
- Built: 1847
- Architectural style: Greek Revival, Georgian
- NRHP reference No.: 71000456
- USMS No.: 087-CBS-0208-NR-NRD-ML

Significant dates
- Added to NRHP: May 06, 1971
- Designated USMS: August 7, 1985

The Stephen D. Lee House in Columbus, Mississippi, was built in 1847 by Thomas Garton Blewett. It was listed on the National Register of Historic Places in 1971 and declared a Mississippi Landmark in 1985. It was the home of Confederate Lt. Gen. Stephen D. Lee.

The house is open for tours on Fridays and features the Florence McLeod Hazard Museum with exhibits on local and regional history, and items dating between 1833 and 1908, the years covering Confederate Gen. Stephen D. Lee’s life.
