= John F. Cates House =

Historic house in Mississippi, United States

- U.S. National Register of Historic Places
- Mississippi Landmark
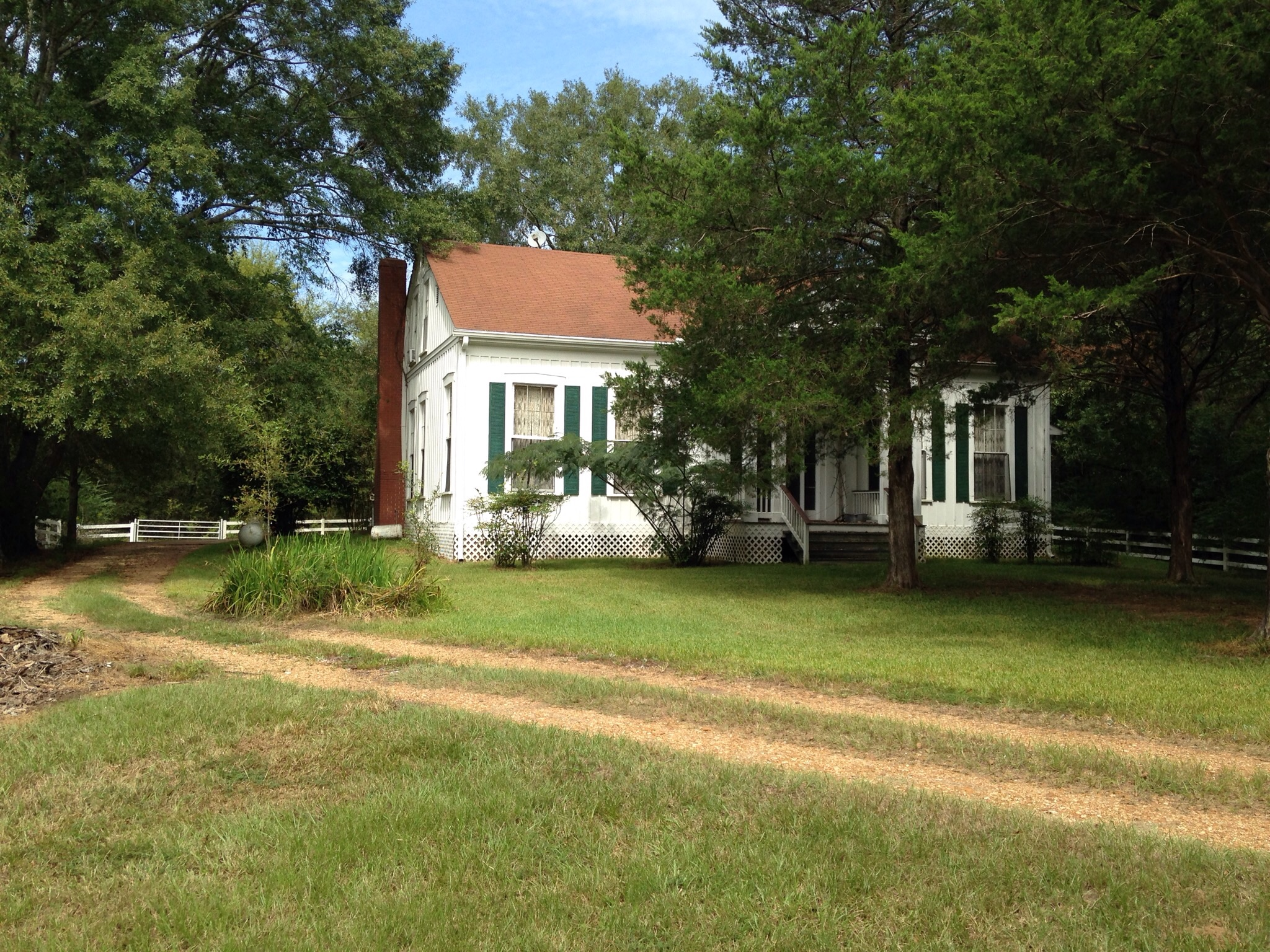
- John F. Cates House in 2016

- Location within Mississippi Location within the United States
- Nearest city: Brownsville, Mississippi
- Coordinates: 32°27′6″N 90°25′13″W
- Built: 1859
- Architect: Cates, John F.
- Architectural style: Greek Revival
- NRHP reference No.: 85001076
- USMS No.: 049-BOL-2101-NR-ML

Significant dates
- Added to NRHP: May 16, 1985
- Designated USMS: December 6, 1985

The John F. Cates House (sometimes locally referred to as "The Hill") is a historic structure that was built ca. 1859. The house, which stands on the north side of Mississippi, is listed in the National Register of Historic Places and is a registered Mississippi Landmark.

== History ==
The house, which has been in the same family for six generations (its entire history to date), is a vernacular example of the type of Greek Revival architecture built by small farmers in the area during the antebellum years. It is the sole surviving antebellum structure in Brownsville and was damaged during a Civil War skirmish, when a chimney cap was blown off by an artillery round.

The house was restored in 1989-1992 by the late Marcus Charles Hammack, a descendant of the original builder.

== Features ==
The John F. Cates House is a story-and-one-half, five-bay, side-gabled residence with a gabled portico on the front and a full-width gallery across the back. The basic plan is a center hall with two large rooms on either side; there is also a modern apartment in the half-story, accessible by a stair mounting from the back gallery.

Notable features include board-and-batten siding; eight-foot, paneled, single-leaf doors, tongue-in-groove, random width heart pine floors; and a mixture of original pilastered and shouldered-architrave mantels.
