= Brownrigg-Harris-Kennebrew House =

Historic house in Mississippi, United States

- U.S. National Register of Historic Places
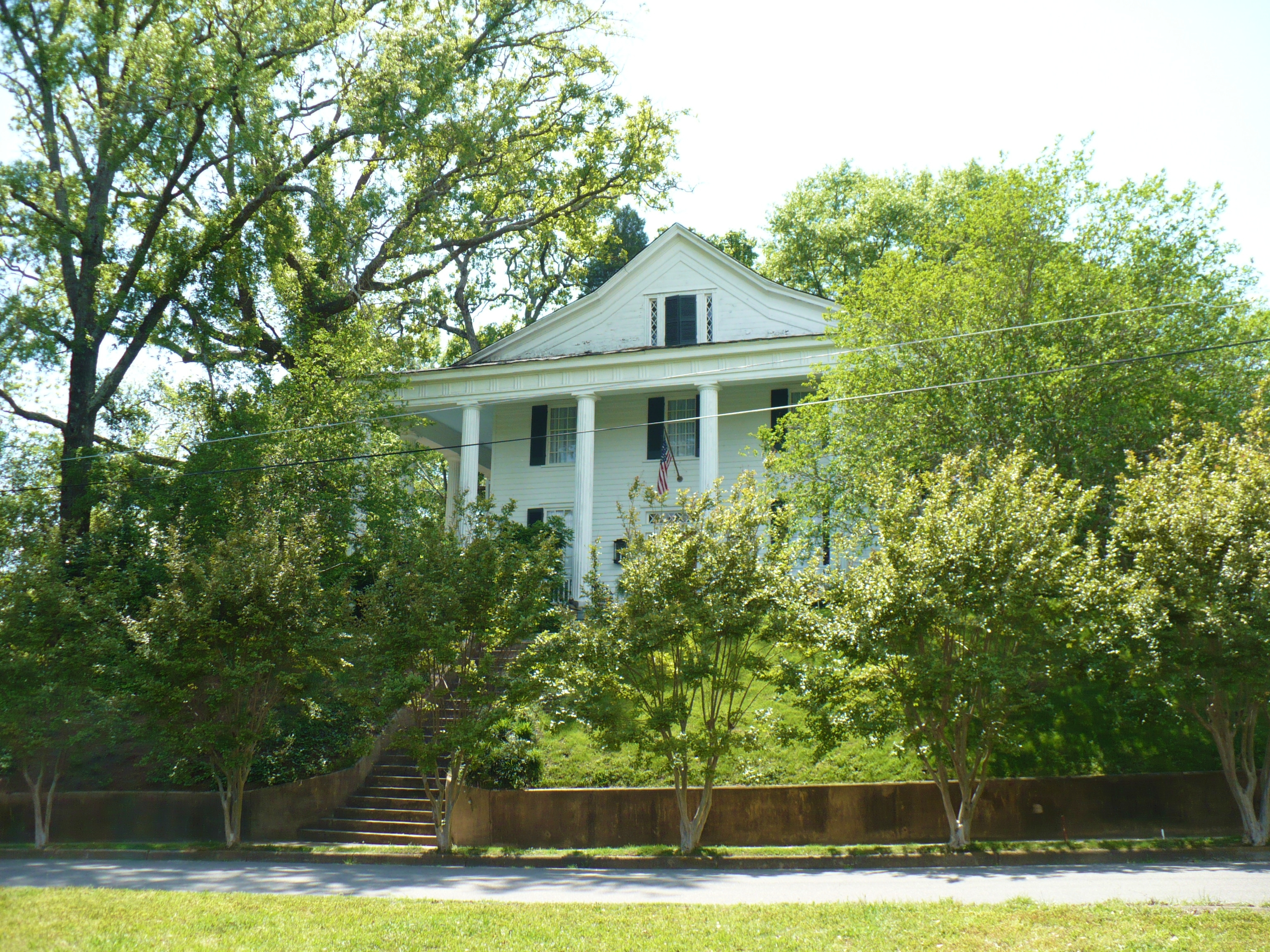

- Location within Mississippi Location within the United States
- Interactive map showing the location for Brownrigg-Harris-Kennebrew House
- Location: 515 9th St. N., Columbus, Mississippi
- Coordinates: 33°30′7″N 88°25′24″W
- Area: less than one acre
- Built: 1837
- Architectural style: Greek Revival, temple form house
- NRHP reference No.: 78001614
- Added to NRHP: May 22, 1978

The Brownrigg-Harris-Kennebrew House (also known as Temple Heights) is a historic house in Columbus, Lowndes County, Mississippi.

== Location ==
It is located at 515 9th Street North in Columbus, Mississippi.

== Overview ==
It was built in 1837 for General Richard T. Brownrigg (1793-1841), a wealthy planter who moved from Chowan County, North Carolina to Columbus, Mississippi in 1835. The architectural style is at once Federal and Greek Revival. It was built in the Federal style, as evident from the facade and the interior. After Brownrigg died, it was purchased by Thomas Harris in 1841. In 1854, a Doric portico was added. It was then purchased by the Fontaines, followed by the Kinnebrews (who owned it from 1887 to 1965), and then by the Butlers, who purchased it in 1967 and restored it. Temple Heights was purchased by the Novotnys in 2016, and they continue to restore it.

It has been listed on the National Register of Historic Places since May 22, 1978. It is open for tours as a house museum with tickets arranged via the Columbus Visitors Bureau.
