= Aberdeen City Hall =

- U.S. National Register of Historic Places
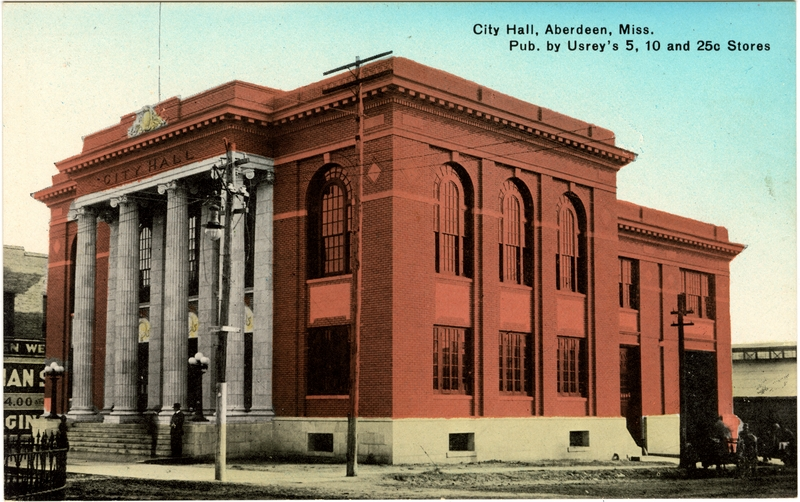
- Aberdeen City Hall circa 1918-1919

- Location within Mississippi Location within the United States
- Location: 125 W. Commerce St., Aberdeen, Mississippi
- Coordinates: 33°49′30″N 88°32′41″W
- Area: less than one acre
- Built: 1912
- Architect: William Drago
- Architectural style: Classical Revival, Beaux Arts
- MPS: Aberdeen MRA
- NRHP reference No.: 88000126
- Added to NRHP: February 22, 1988

The Aberdeen City Hall is an historic governmental building located at 125 West Commerce Street, corner of South Hickory Street, in Aberdeen, Monroe County, Mississippi. It lies across Hickory from the historic U.S. Courthouse and Post Office. Built in 1912, it was designed in a blend of the Classical Revival and Beaux Arts styles of architecture by New Orleans architect William Drago. On February 22, 1988, the building was added to the National Register of Historic Places. It is still being used today (July 2012) as the city hall of Aberdeen.
