= Stone County Courthouse (Mississippi) =

Courthouse in Mississippi, United States

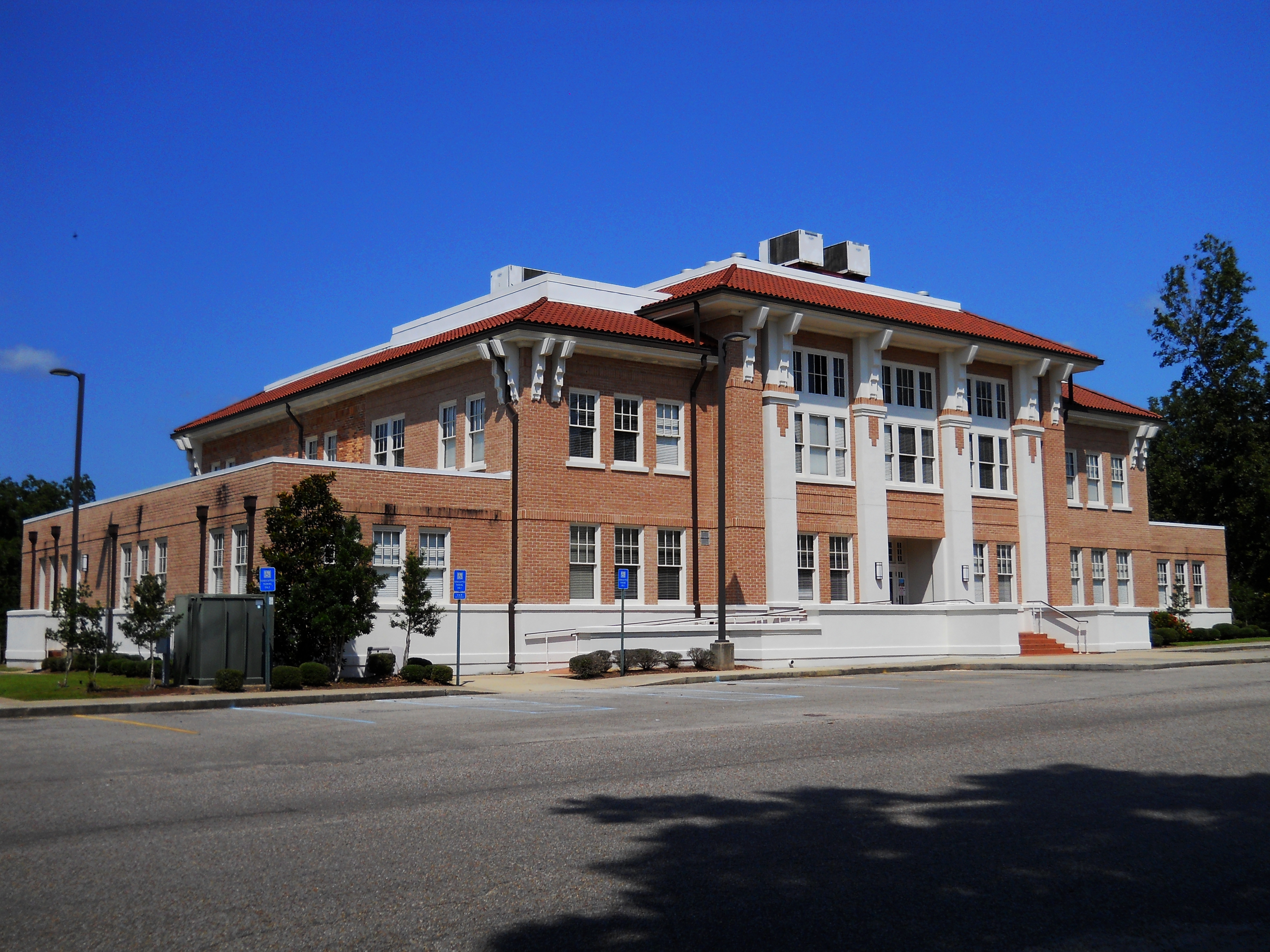
- Stone County Courthouse, 2013

- Location within Mississippi Location within the United States
- Interactive map showing the location of Stone County Courthouse
- 30.8566°N 89.1344°W
- Location: 323 East Cavers Avenue; Wiggins, Mississippi 39577

History
- Built: 1917-18

Site notes
- Area: 2.8 acres (1.1 ha)
- Architect: Xavier A. Kramer
- Governing body: Stone County, Mississippi

Mississippi Landmark
- Designated: July 23, 1996
- Reference no.: 131-WIG-0001-ML

The Stone County Courthouse was constructed in 1917-18 and serves as the seat of county government for Stone County, Mississippi. The courthouse was designated a Mississippi Landmark in 1996.

== History ==
Stone County was created by the Mississippi Legislature in 1916. One of the first acts by the new county’s Board of Supervisors was to award a contract for construction of the county courthouse. Constructed by Standard Construction Company of Meridian, Mississippi, the courthouse was completed in March 1918, at a cost of US$29,515.18 (equivalent to $631,765 in 2025). Within the two-story structure, the lower floor was divided into county offices, and the upper floor served as the courtroom. Offices of the sheriff, tax collector, circuit clerk, and chancery clerk were once located on the first floor. The courthouse was used continuously throughout the 20th century, with modifications that included first-floor extensions on each end of the building.

By the year 2000, the courthouse was in need of renovation. It received a Community Heritage Preservation Grant in 2002 and a Save America’s Treasures grant in 2003. Upgrades included an elevator, a youth court, and internet access. Renovation of the building was completed in September 2004 at a cost of $2.4 million.

== Courthouse grounds ==
The original county jail was built just south of the courthouse. After the structure was abandoned as a jail in the late 20th century, it was renovated to house county offices.

Two memorials are located on the courthouse grounds. One honors Stone County citizens killed in World War I, World War II, Korean War, Vietnam War, Gulf War, and the global war on terrorism. The second memorial is a tribute to Mississippians who received the Medal of Honor.

== Gallery ==
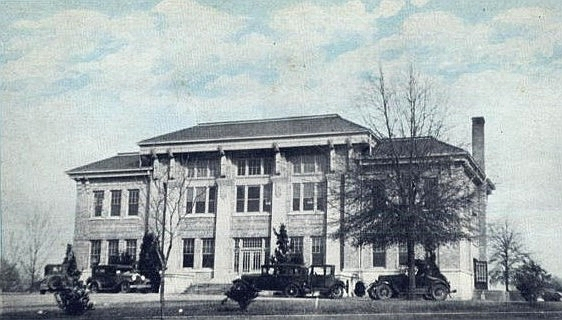
Stone County Courthouse, circa 1920

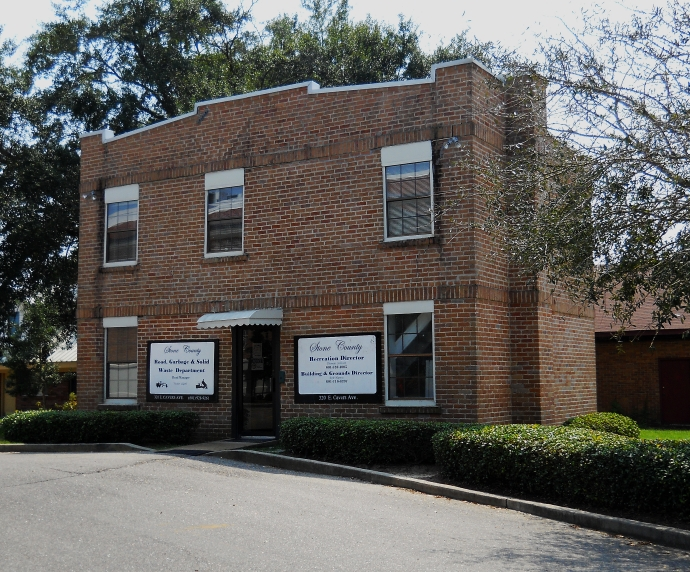
Old Stone County Jail

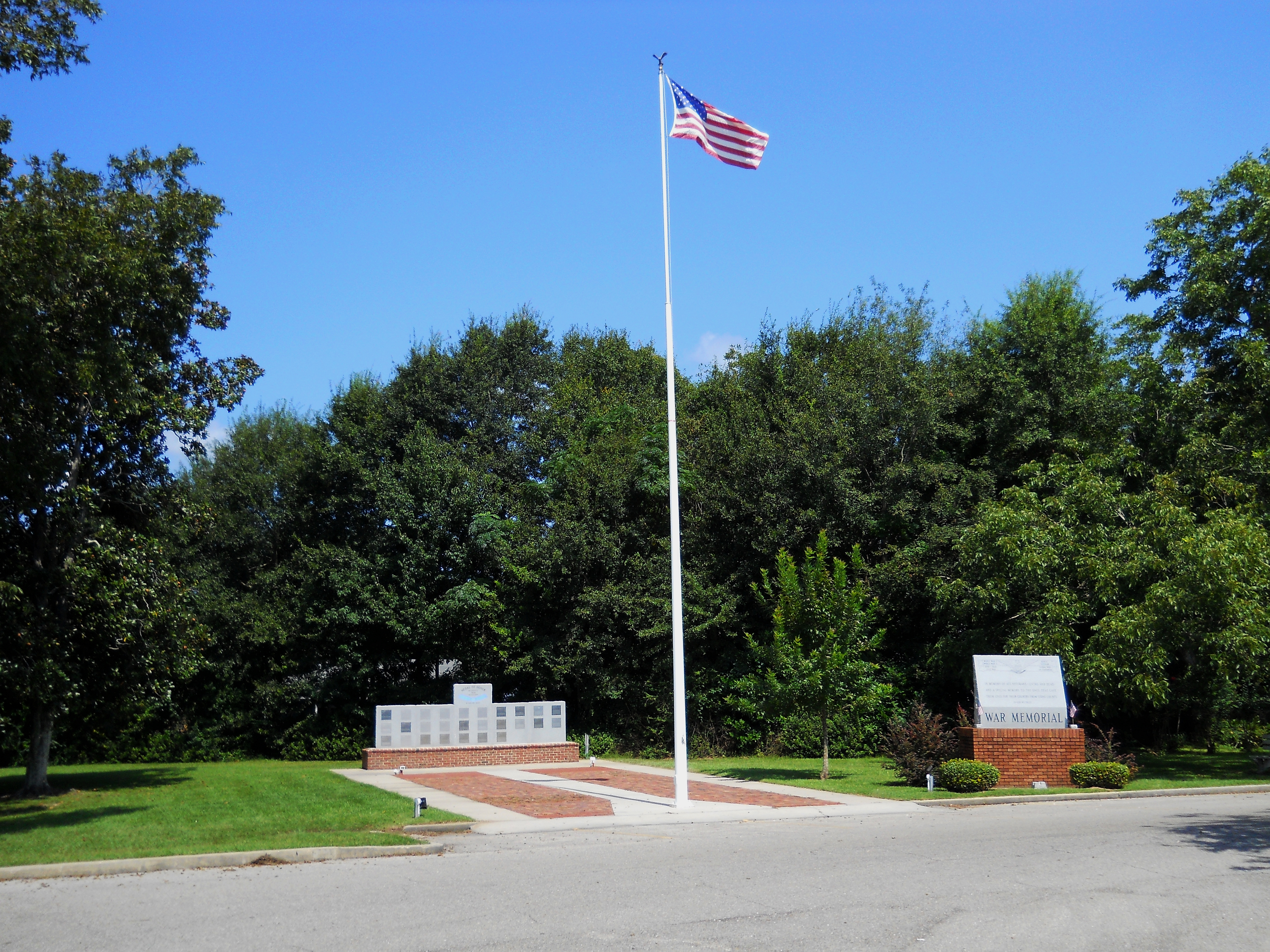
Medal of Honor Memorial (left) & War Memorial (right)
