= Old First Presbyterian Church (Kosciusko, Mississippi) =

Historic church in Mississippi, United States

- First Presbyterian Church, Old
- U.S. National Register of Historic Places
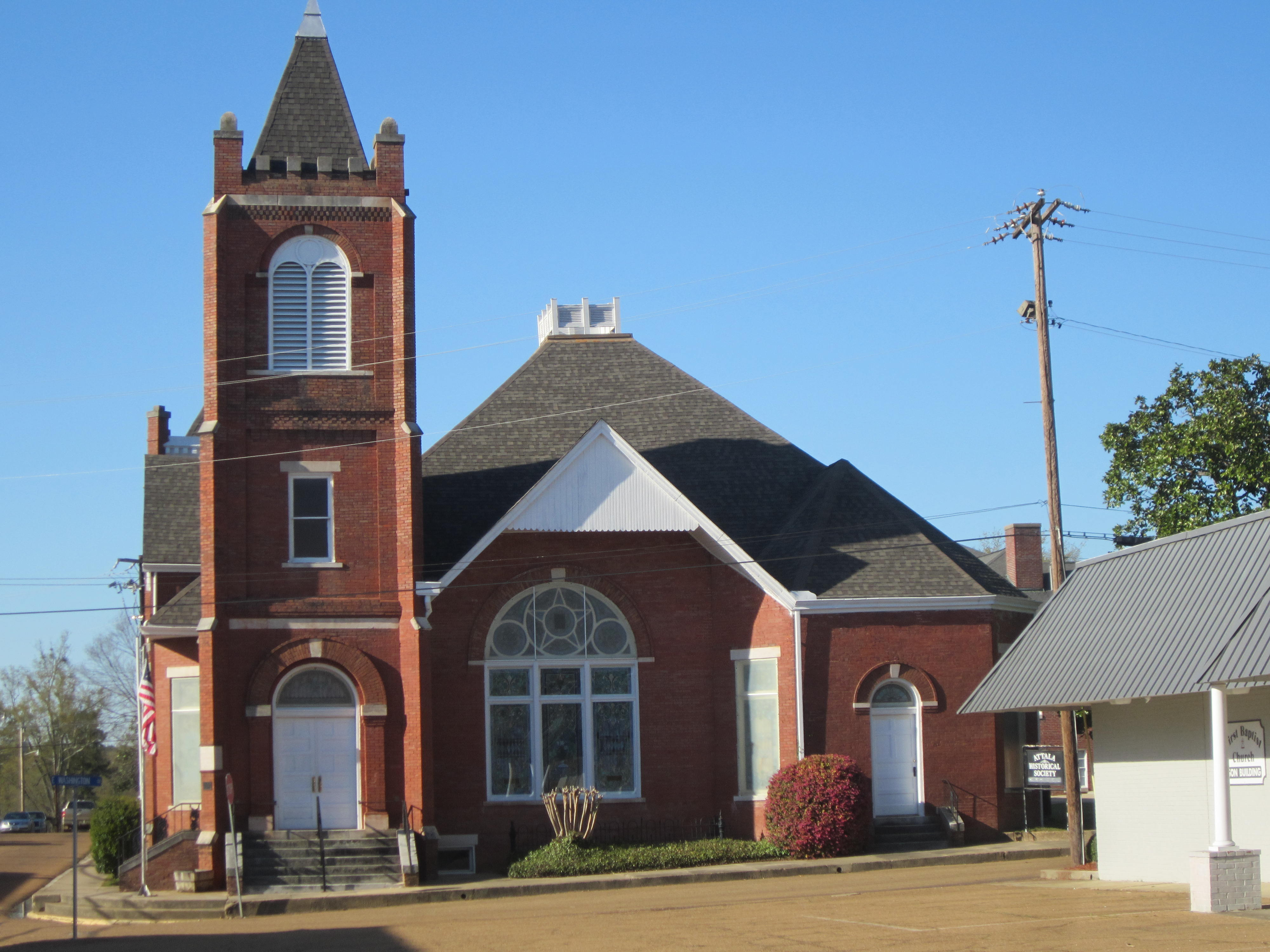

- Location within Mississippi Location within the United States
- Location: Jct. of Huntington and Washington Sts., Kosciusko, Mississippi
- Coordinates: 33°3′31″N 89°35′15″W
- Area: less than one acre
- Built: 1899
- Architectural style: Romanesque
- NRHP reference No.: 92000846
- Added to NRHP: July 10, 1992

Old First Presbyterian Church is a historic church at the junction of Huntington and Washington Streets in Kosciusko, Mississippi and was founded in 1844. It is a member of the Mississippi Valley Presbytery of the Presbyterian Church in America. The current pastor is Rev. Philip Palmertree.

The church building is located at 603 Smythe Street at the corner of Smythe Street and Calvary street, and was built in 1899 and added to the National Register in 1992.
