= Washington County Courthouse (Mississippi) =

- U.S. National Register of Historic Places
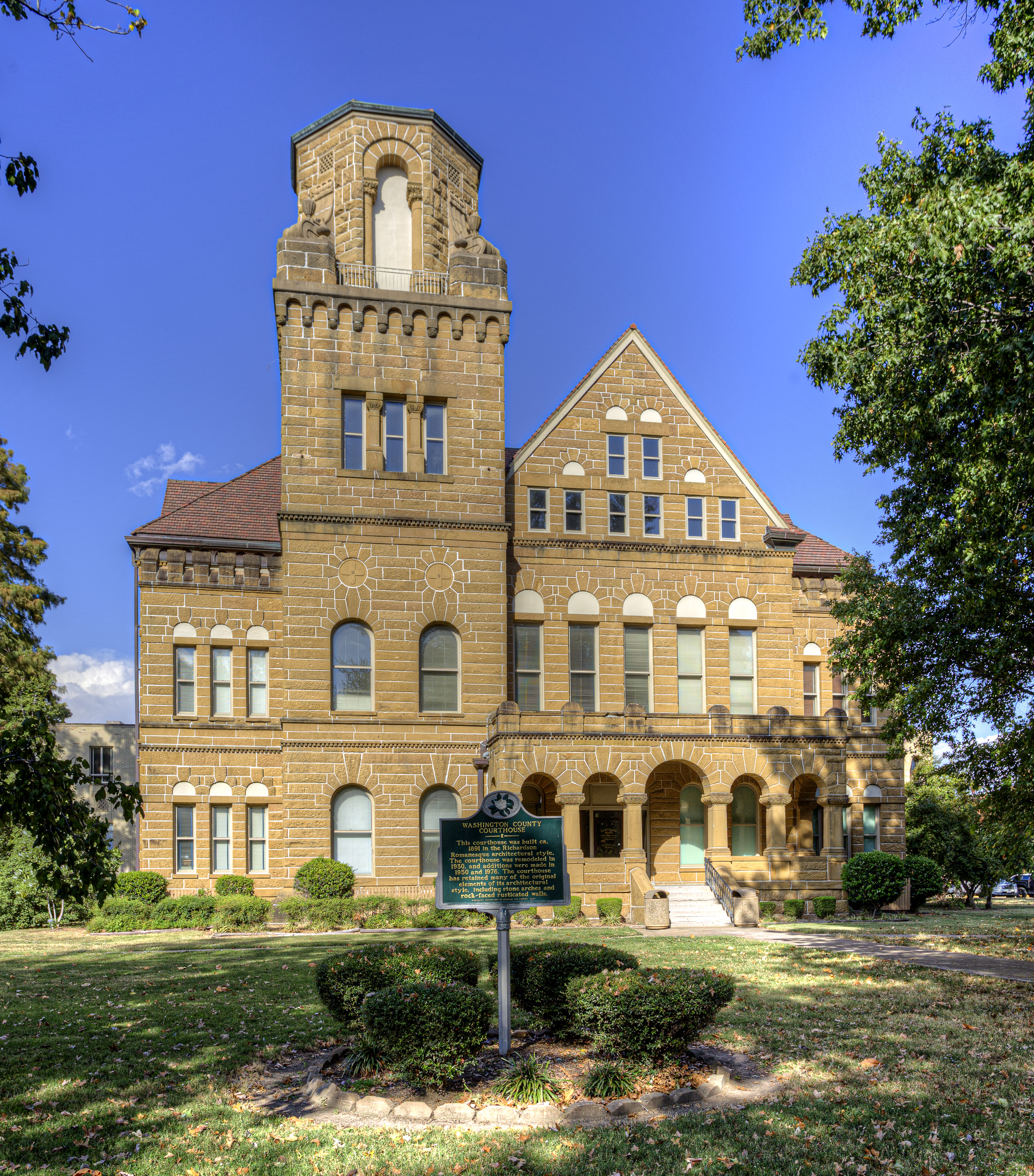
- Washington County Courthouse in 2022

- Location within Mississippi Location within the United States
- Location: 900 Washington Avenue, Greenville, Mississippi, U.S.
- Coordinates: 33°24′27.7″N 91°03′10″W
- Area: 4 acres (1.6 ha)
- Built: 1891
- Built by: John F. Barnes
- Architect: McDonald Brothers
- Architectural style: Richardsonian Romanesque
- NRHP reference No.: 14000570
- Added to NRHP: September 10, 2014

The Washington County Courthouse is a historic courthouse in Greenville, Mississippi. It has been listed on the National Register of Historic Places since September 10, 2014.

== History ==
The first courthouse in Greenville was built when the new town became the county seat in 1847. The town was moved northward due to recurring flooding and damage caused during the Civil War. A new courthouse was built near the corner of Poplar and Nelson Streets. That building was replaced by the current two and a half-story building, constructed in 1891 and opened in 1892. It was modified in 1930, 1950, 1965 and 1976, tripling its original size. It is one of the few remaining examples of a stone Richardsonian Romanesque courthouse in Mississippi.

The courthouse is noted as the location of a 1922 speech by former United States Senator LeRoy Percy against the expansion of the Ku Klux Klan into Washington County.

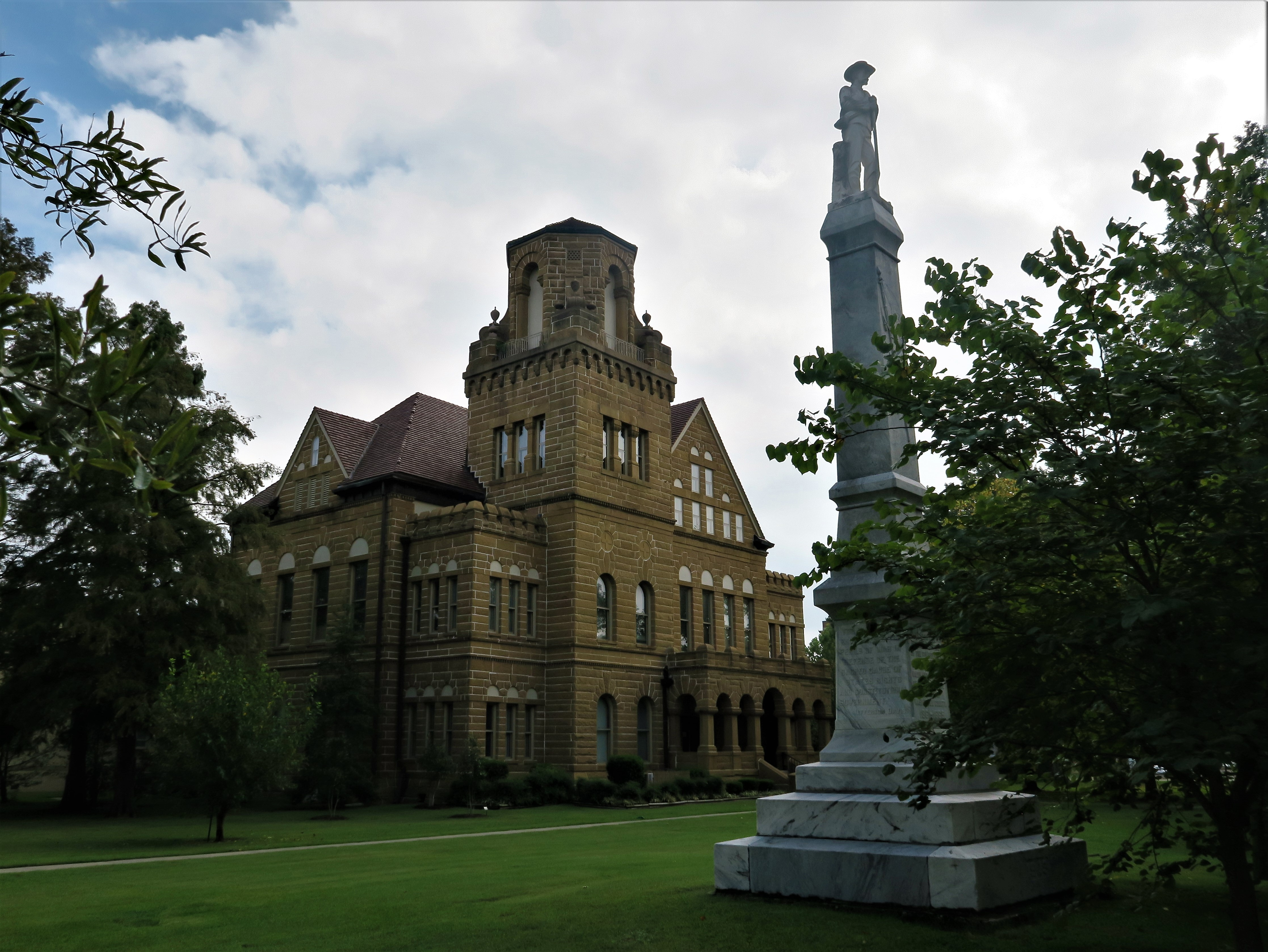
Courthouse and Confederate memorial
