= Walthall School (Hattiesburg, Mississippi) =

- U.S. Historic district – Contributing property
- Mississippi Landmark
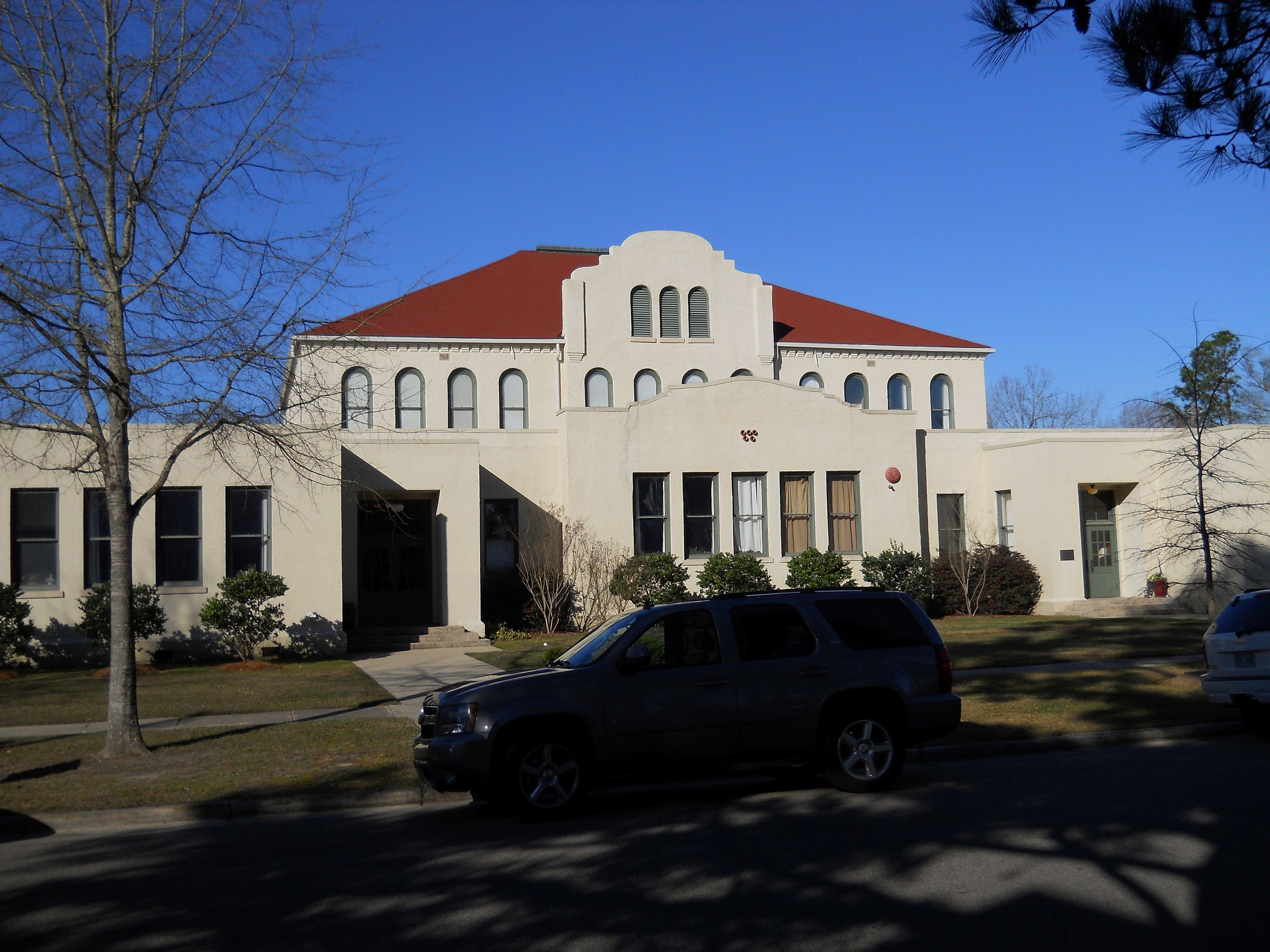
- Main facade in 2013

- Location within Mississippi Location within the United States
- Location: 601 (603) Court Street, Hattiesburg, Mississippi
- Coordinates: 31.31878°N 89.28808°W
- Built: 1902
- Architect: Robert E. Lee
- Architectural style: Mission Revival as of 1928
- Part of: Hattiesburg Historic Neighborhood District (element 205) (ID80002236)
- USMS No.: 035-HAT-0705-NRD-ML

Significant dates
- Designated CP: September 17, 1980
- Designated USMS: May 6, 1988

Walthall School, also known as Court Street School, is located at 601 Court Street in Hattiesburg, Mississippi. It was utilized as a public school building from 1902 until 1987. The building is a contributing property to the Hattiesburg Historic Neighborhood District, which was placed on the National Register of Historic Places in 1980. The building was designated a Mississippi Landmark in 1988.

== Description ==
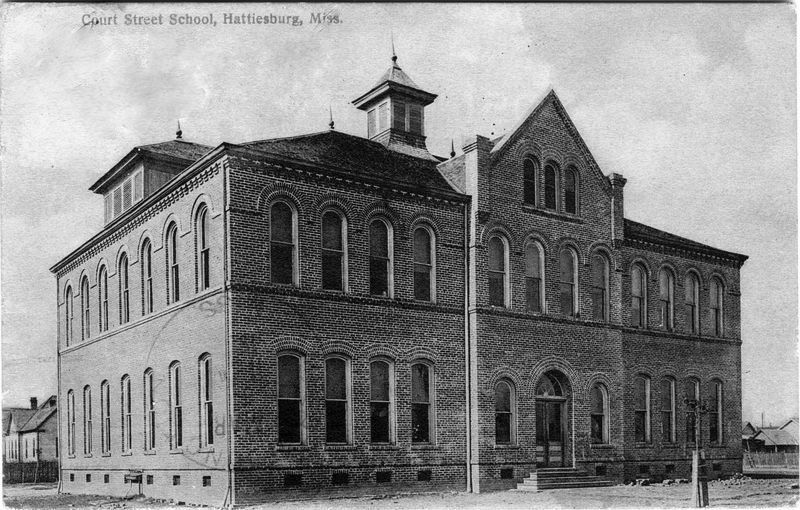
Walthall School as it appeared in the 1920s, before remodeling to Mission Revival architecture and application of stucco

Walthall School was constructed as a two-story brick building with a 12-bay front facade that contained round-arch windows. The building has a hipped roof, with a Mission style effect achieved by a curvilinear gable. It has one-story flat-roof additions. Stucco was applied to the outer brick walls as a Works Progress Administration project (between 1935 and 1943).

== History ==
Shortly after the turn of the 20th century, the Hattiesburg School Board engaged the services of architect Robert E. Lee to design the Court Street school building. (Note: Lee also designed Hattiesburg's Eaton Elementary School and the Old Hattiesburg High School, both individually listed on the National Register, per ("National Register Information System". National Register of Historic Places. National Park Service. July 9, 2010.))

The school was named for Edward Cary Walthall, a general in the Confederate States Army during the American Civil War and a United States senator from Mississippi (1885–1894).

In 1928, the building was expanded and remodeled to reflect a Mission Revival architectural style, under the direction of architect Noah Webster Overstreet. The school was again enlarged by additions made in 1941, by architects Landry & Matthes, and in 1957, by Associated School Architects.

Use of the structure as a public school ended in 1987. In 1995, the Hattiesburg Public School District sold the building and grounds to the Hattiesburg Historic Neighborhood Association. The Association then created the Walthall Foundation to own and operate the building.

In 2006, the Walthall Foundation sold the building to a development company for establishment of condominiums within the structure, while retaining the building's Mississippi Landmark status, as well as its status on the National Register of Historic Places.
