= National Register of Historic Places listings in Forrest County, Mississippi =

Location of Forrest County in Mississippi

This is a list of the National Register of Historic Places listings in Forrest County, Mississippi.

This is intended to be a complete list of the properties and districts on the National Register of Historic Places in Forrest County, Mississippi, United States. Latitude and longitude coordinates are provided for many National Register properties and districts; these locations may be seen together in a map.

There are 20 properties and districts listed on the National Register in the county.

This National Park Service list is complete through NPS recent listings posted October 23, 2026.

== Current listings ==
	Name on the Register	Image	Date listed	Location	City or town	Description
1	Beverly Drive-In Theatre	Beverly Drive-In Theatre	July 30, 2008 (#08000761)	5320 U.S. Route 49 South at Old Airport Road; 31°16′42″N 89°17′16″W	Hattiesburg	Constructed 1948, destroyed by fire October 2010
2	Building 1071	Building 1071	September 2, 1997 (#97000930)	Junction of Jackson Avenue and Jackson Avenue West; 31°12′04″N 89°13′19″W	Camp Shelby	At Camp Shelby. Constructed in 1938 to house officers
3	Building 6981, Camp Shelby	Building 6981, Camp Shelby	June 11, 1992 (#92000698)	Camp Shelby; 31°11′54″N 89°13′28″W	Camp Shelby	Constructed in 1917 as a World War I Ammunition Magazine
4	Burkett's Creek Archeological Site	Burkett's Creek Archeological Site	April 14, 2000 (#00000380)	Address restricted	Hattiesburg	Prehistoric domestic and industry/processing/extraction site
5	East Sixth Street USO Building	East Sixth Street USO Building	April 6, 2004 (#04000267)	305 East Sixth Street; 31°20′03″N 89°17′34″W	Hattiesburg	Constructed in 1942, serves as African American Military History Museum
6	Eaton Elementary School	Eaton Elementary School	July 16, 2008 (#08000676)	1105 McInnis Avenue; 31°19′26″N 89°16′50″W	Hattiesburg	Constructed in 1905, vacant, not in use
7	Hattiesburg Historic Neighborhood District	Hattiesburg Historic Neighborhood District	September 17, 1980 (#80002236)	Roughly bounded by railroad tracks, Katie Ave., and Frederick and Hardy Sts. 31°19′13″N 89°17′13″W	Hattiesburg	Sacred Heart Church is located in the Hattiesburg Historic Neighborhood District
8	Hub City Historic District	Hub City Historic District	August 29, 1980 (#80002237)	U.S. Routes 11 and 49; also roughly along Main, Market, Newman and Walnut Sts. 31°19′37″N 89°17′27″W	Hattiesburg	Second set of boundaries represents a boundary increase of August 9, 2002. McLeod House (circa 1896) is in the Hub City Historic District.
9	Meador Homestead	Meador Homestead	November 5, 2010 (#10000885)	6775 U.S. Route 49; 31°21′40″N 89°21′03″W	Hattiesburg	Constructed in 1885 as a double pen, dog-trot, log cabin
10	The New York	The New York	April 8, 1999 (#99000383)	63 Fruitland Park Rd. 30°54′57″N 89°10′05″W	Fruitland Park	Constructed in 1914 using Shingle style architecture
11	North Main Street Historic District	North Main Street Historic District	April 16, 1993 (#93000307)	Roughly bounded by Jackson Street, Gordon's Creek, South, North, Providence, and Red Streets, and the Illinois Central railroad tracks 31°20′07″N 89°17′57″W	Hattiesburg	The Montague House (built circa 1905) is in the North Main Street Historic District.
12	Oaks Historic District	Oaks Historic District	March 4, 1993 (#93000136)	Roughly bounded by Hardy, Second, Railroad, and 11th Avenues; 31°19′13″N 89°17′59″W	Hattiesburg	Hattiesburg Public School Administration Building, formerly Camp Elementary (built c. 1907), and Trinity Episcopal Church are in the district.
13	Old Hattiesburg High School	Old Hattiesburg High School	May 29, 1987 (#87000817)	846 Main Street; 31°19′45″N 89°17′44″W	Hattiesburg	Constructed circa 1911, partially destroyed by arson 2007
14	Parkhaven Historic District	Parkhaven Historic District	August 9, 2002 (#02000856)	Roughly along S. 22nd Ave. and S. 21st Ave., from Hardy to Mamie Sts. 31°19′18″N 89°19′24″W	Hattiesburg	Parkhaven Arch (circa 1925) at Hardy Street and 22nd Street is in the Parkhaven Historic District.
15	Saenger Theatre	Saenger Theatre	May 29, 1979 (#79001307)	Corner of Forrest and Front Streets; 31°19′32″N 89°17′25″W	Hattiesburg	Constructed circa 1929, Art Deco architectural style, used as civic theater and auditorium
16	Tall Pines	Tall Pines	October 16, 1980 (#80002238)	South of Hattiesburg off Memorial Drive; 31°16′34″N 89°17′30″W	Hattiesburg	Constructed circa 1925 as country house for Paul B. Johnson, Sr.
17	Temple B'nai Israel	Temple B'nai Israel	January 25, 2018 (#100002028)	901 Mamie St. 31°19′10″N 89°18′30″W	Hattiesburg	
18	The University of Southern Mississippi Historic District	The University of Southern Mississippi Historic District	March 10, 2010 (#10000063)	118 College Dr. 31°19′47″N 89°17′44″W	Hattiesburg	
19	U.S. District Courthouse	U.S. District Courthouse	September 18, 1973 (#73001007)	200 W. Pine St. 31°19′33″N 89°17′28″W	Hattiesburg	Constructed in 1910 as Post Office, renovated in 1939 to serve as Courthouse. Now used as the Hattiesburg Municipal Court.
20	U.S. Post Office	U.S. Post Office	April 21, 1983 (#83000951)	115 W. Pine Street; 31°19′36″N 89°17′28″W	Hattiesburg	Constructed in 1934, Art Deco architectural style

== See also ==
- List of National Historic Landmarks in Mississippi
- National Register of Historic Places listings in Mississippi
