= Walthall =

Walthall is a surname of English extraction, a given name and a placename. It may refer to:

== People ==
- Anna Mae Walthall (1894–1950), American actress
- Edward C. Walthall (1831–1898), American Confederate general and politician
- Henry B. Walthall (1878–1936), American actor
- Madison Walthall (1792–1848), American politician
- Thomas Walthall, Master of the Mercers' Company (1611)
- William Walthall, Master of the Mercers' Company (1605)
- William Walthall, patentee of land in Virginia in 1654 that became Port Walthall
- Walthall Robertson Joyner (1854–1925), the 40th mayor of Atlanta, Georgia
- Walthall M. Moore (1886-1960), politician from St. Louis and first African American to serve in the Missouri state legislature

== Places ==
- Walthall, Mississippi, a village in Webster County
- Walthall County, Mississippi, a county in that state
- Port Walthall, a former town on the Appomattox River in Chesterfield County, Virginia

== Other ==
- Walthall County School District, public school district in Tylertown, Mississippi
- Walthall School (Hattiesburg, Mississippi), former public school on the National Register of Historic Places
- Battle of Port Walthall Junction, fought May 6–7, 1864, between Union and Confederate forces during the American Civil War
