= New York Hotel (disambiguation) =

The New York Hotel is a historic site in Sydney, Australia.

New York Hotel may also refer to:

- New York Hotel (Fruitland Park, Mississippi), a historic building
- New York Hotel (Novocherkassk), an object of cultural heritage of Russia
- New York Hotel (Salt Lake City), a historic building

== See also ==
- Hotel New York (disambiguation)
- New York-New York Hotel and Casino, a casino hotel on the Las Vegas Strip in Paradise, Nevada
- List of hotels in New York City
