= Building 6981, Camp Shelby =

- U.S. National Register of Historic Places
- Mississippi Landmark
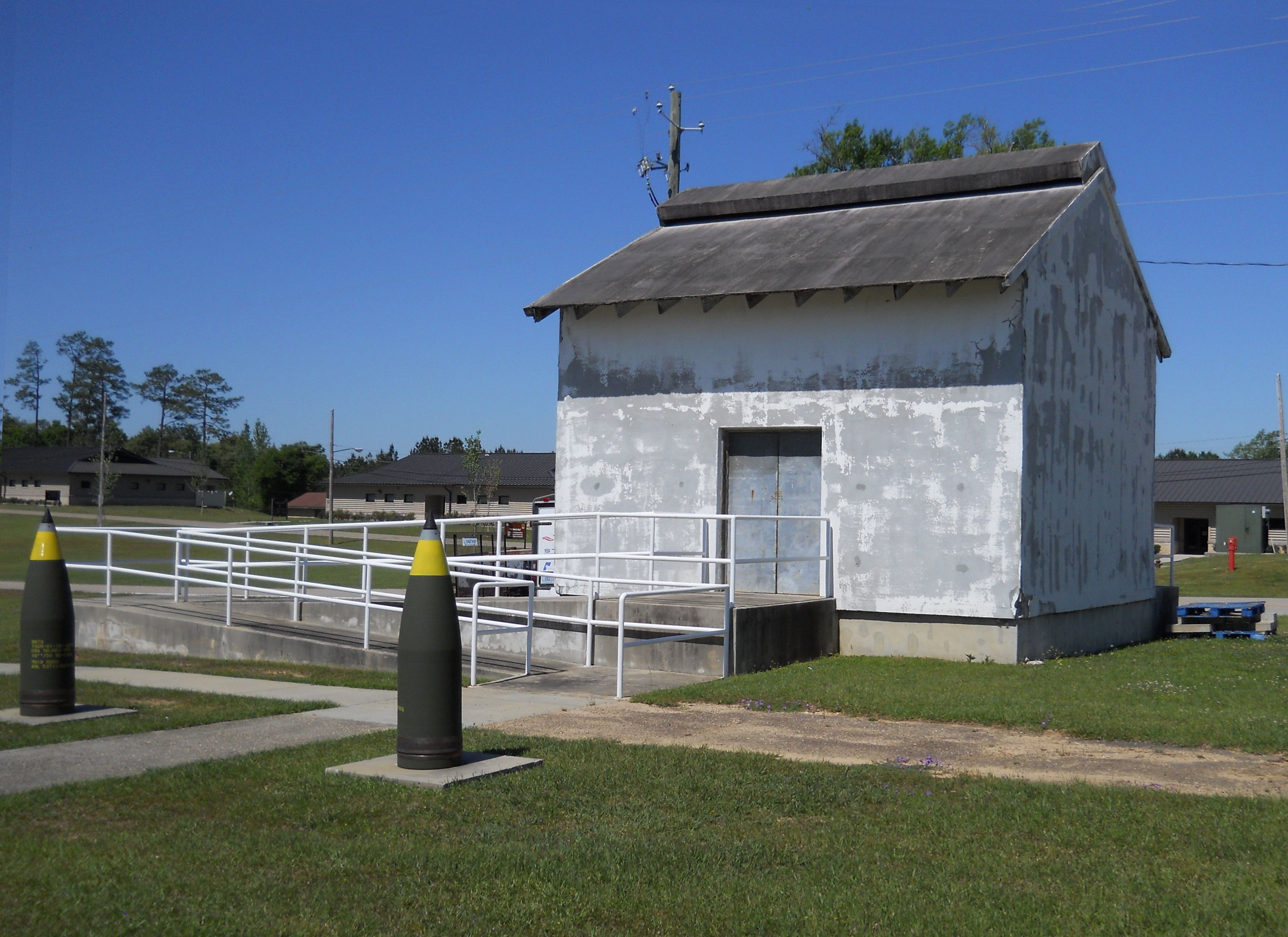
- Building 6981 in 2017

- Location within Mississippi Location within the United States
- Location: On grounds of Mississippi Armed Forces Museum, Camp Shelby, Mississippi
- Coordinates: 31.1982°N 89.22439°W
- Built: 1917
- MPS
- NRHP reference No.: 92000698
- USMS No.: 035-HAT-6002-NR-ML

Significant dates
- Added to NRHP: June 11, 1992
- Designated USMS: December 7, 1995

Building 6981 is a historic ammunition magazine located at Camp Shelby, Mississippi. Constructed in 1917, it is the only building at Camp Shelby still standing from the WWI era. The building was placed on the National Register of Historic Places in 1992 and was designated a Mississippi Landmark in 1995.

== Description ==
Building 6981 is a single room structure that measures 20.3 ft (6.2 m) by 20 ft (6.1 m). It was constructed on a poured concrete slab that is 3 ft (0.91 m) thick. The outer walls are poured concrete over wire mesh.

The interior floor space is approximately 360 ft^{2} (33 m^{2}). Height of the interior walls from the floor to wooden ceiling beams is 13.5 ft (4.1 m). The interior walls are paneled with pine boards that run horizontally, up to the top of two door frames that are centered in the north and south facades. The door frames are 4.5 ft (1.4 m) wide and support double-leaf wooden doors that are 6.5 feet (2.0 m) tall. The south facing doors are covered in sheet metal.

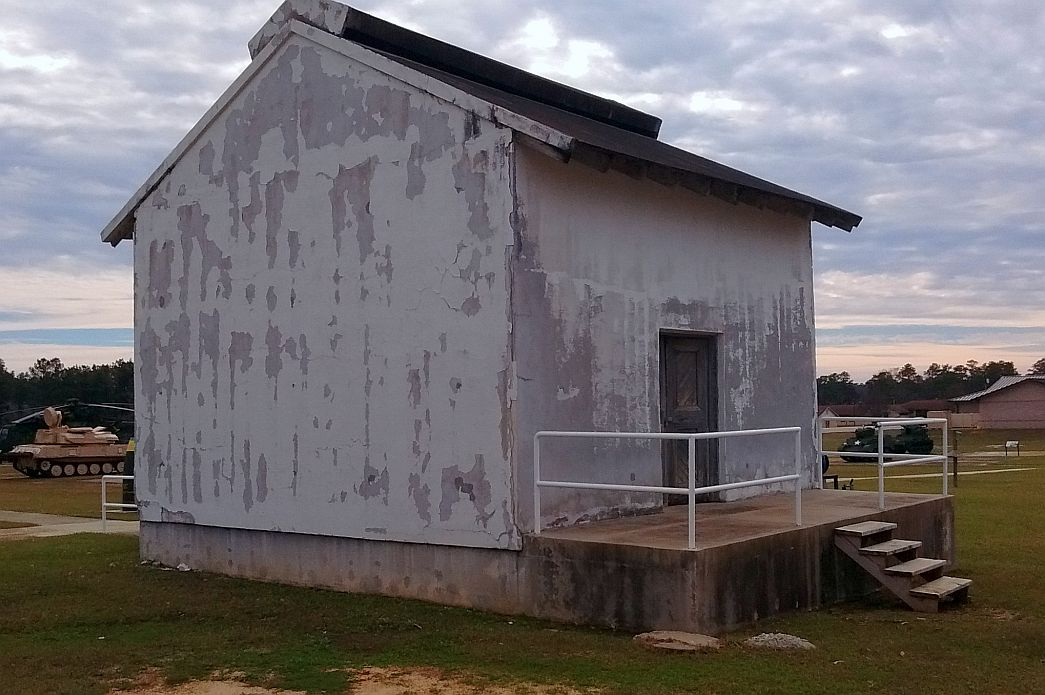
Northeast elevation in 2017

The roof is also concrete, poured over wire mesh, and was constructed with a clerestory-style raised center for ventilation. The north facade has a concrete loading platform that is 20 ft (6.1 m) long and 5.83 ft (1.78 m) wide. Access to the south entrance doors was provided by poured concrete steps, but a concrete ramp was constructed to facilitate ADA accessibility.

== Location ==
Building 6981 was originally located in an undeveloped wooded area of Camp Shelby at coordinates 31.1883°N 89.2192°W. The building was relocated approximately 0.75 mi (1.21 km) onto the grounds of the Mississippi Armed Forces Museum and is the oldest structure at Camp Shelby, dating from the WWI era.
