= Edmond Edward Wysinger =

Edmond Edward Wysinger (c. 1816–1891) was an African American pioneer in California, arriving around October 1849 at the beginning of the California Gold Rush. Wysinger was one of the first African Americans to migrate to California from the American South.

== Biography ==
Edmond Edward Wysinger was born in about 1816, the son of a Cherokee woman and a man of African descent.

Wysinger came to California by way of the Isthmus of Panama with his enslavers Elizabeth Frances (née Burfoot) and Madison Walthall Sr., arriving around October 1849 — the height of the California Gold Rush. Wysinger took on the last name of one of his enslavers; his original Indian name was Bush. Madison Walthall was a California legislator before it became a state in 1850.

After arriving in the northern mine area of California's Mother Lode Gold Belt, Wysinger with a group of 100 or more African American miners, were surface mining in and around Morman Island, Mokelumne Hill, at Placerville and Grass Valley. Mokelumne Hill was called "Moke Hill". This region was first inhabited by a tribe of Miwok Native Americans who were called "Mokelumne", which means people of Mokel. "Moke Hill" began to grow after gold was discovered in 1848. Place names like Negro Hill, Negro Bar (a large sand bar located on the south bank of the lower American River) and Negro Flat attest to the presence of Blacks in California. Wysinger mined at Mokelumne, Murphy's Camp, Diamond and Mud Springs, Grass Valley, Negro Bar and elsewhere in the mining districts of California. It took him about a year to self-purchase his freedom for US $1,000.

Case opinions, October 14, 1889

In 1853, Alfred and Susan Hines Wilson, arrived in Miles Creek in Mariposa County, California, from Wayne County in Missouri, going first to Texas then to California by way of ox-team. There were more than a 100 wagons in the ox-driven team lasting from March to December 1853. In Merced, Edmond Wysinger met and married his wife, Penecia.

Around 1862, the family moved to Visalia, California, where eight children were born: six boys Jesse, Arthur, James, Reuben, Hervey, Marion, and two girls Martha and Bertha.

=== California Supreme Court case ===
On January 29, 1890, in the Visalia, California court case Wysinger v. Crookshank, 82 Cal 588, 720, (1890), the California Supreme Court ruled that public school districts in California may not establish separate schools for children of African descent.

In 1862, Visalia was a community deeply divided by the American Civil War (1861–1865) and many sided with the South. Despite the turmoil, Wysinger stayed in the community. Wysinger, a self-educated man, worked as a laborer and part-time preacher. He stressed the importance of education for his children. He tried to admit his son Arthur to a regular public school but was refused, resulting in him entering a suit against the county school board of education in the Supreme Court of the State California in October 1888. On March 1, 1890, the California Supreme Court, in Wysinger vs. Crookshank reversed a lower court decision and ordered that 12-year-old Arthur Wysinger be admitted to Visalia's regular school system.

If the people of the state desired separate but equal schools for citizens of African descent, and Indians, their wish may be accomplished by laws enacted by the law-making department of the government in accordance with existing constitutional provisions. But this course had not been pursued, as the law stood in 1890, and the powers given to boards of education and school trustees, under section 1617 of the Political Code, did not include the right claimed by the board of education of Visalia. The laws segregating Chinese children, (see United States v. Wong Kim Ark), remained on the books probably because it was the general impression that only discriminatory laws aimed at African Americans and Indians were forbidden by the Fourteenth Amendment to the United States Constitution.
