= Robert E. Lee (architect) =

American architect

Robert Emmett Lee (1870–1925) was a prolific architect in Hattiesburg, Mississippi.

He was a native of Meridian, Mississippi. He died suddenly at his home at 463 Southern Avenue, Hattiesburg, when talking with one of his daughters, at age 54.

== Career ==
Lee designed many works in Hattiesburg, but also elsewhere in South Mississippi, and in Columbus, Mississippi (replacing buildings destroyed by a fire). At least three of his works are listed on the National Register of Historic Places.

Lee's works include:

- Walthall School (1902), Hattiesburg, Mississippi, a contributing building in the NRHP-listed Hattiesburg Historic Neighborhood District
- Eaton Elementary School (1905), 1105 McInnis Ave. Hattiesburg, Mississippi, NRHP-listed
- Hattiesburg Trust & Banking Company (1905), a contributing building in the NRHP-listed Hub City Historic District.
- Ross Building (1907), Hattiesburg
- Masonic Temple (1920), Hattiesburg
- Old Hattiesburg High School (front addition, 1921), 846 Main St., Hattiesburg, the only known Jacobethan Style work by Lee, NRHP-listed
- City Hall (1923), Hattiesburg
- I.O.O.F. Lodge No. 27 (1927), Hattiesburg
- a school (1927), Brooklyn, Mississippi
- First Presbyterian Church, Hattiesburg
- Main Street Baptist Church, Hattiesburg
