= Hotel New York (disambiguation) =

Hotel New York may refer to:

== Hotels ==
- Hotel New York (Rotterdam), a hotel in Rotterdam, the Netherlands
- Disney's Hotel New York, a hotel at Disneyland Resort Paris
- Hotel New York (Venice), a former hotel

== Music ==
- Hotel New York, an album by Anouk, conceived in Rotterdam Hotel New York

== See also ==
- New York Hotel (disambiguation)
- New York City hotels
