= Boyce Holleman =

American politician (1924–2003)

Jesse Boyce Holleman
- Jesse Boyce Holleman, State Representative in Mississippi Legislature, 1947-53.

Jesse Boyce Holleman (February 26, 1924 – November 21, 2003) was an American war veteran, attorney, politician, and actor.

Boyce Holleman was born in Fruitland Park, MS, to a family that made their living in timber and construction. As a Naval Aviator in World War II, he was shot down while making a bomb run during the invasion of Saipan and spent 14 months recovering from severe injuries. He achieved the rank of Lieutenant Commander and was awarded the Purple Heart.

Holleman attended Perkinston Junior College, now Mississippi Gulf Coast Community College, at Perkinston, MS and the University of Mississippi at Oxford, MS. After graduating from the University of Mississippi School of Law in 1950, Holleman established his legal practice in Wiggins and moved his family to Gulfport, MS in 1967.

Holleman was elected to the Mississippi House of Representatives in 1947, at the age of 23, and served until 1953 when he was appointed to the position of District Attorney for the Mississippi Gulf Coast. As District Attorney, Holleman survived an assassination attempt by the Dixie Mafia. During his tenure as District Attorney, Holleman fought to overturn a crooked election, taking this battle all the way to the State Supreme Court. He was re-elected five times as District Attorney, retiring in 1972, to return to the private practice of law. When reflecting on his life, Holleman said that he wanted to be remembered, first and foremost, as a lawyer.

Holleman served as Attorney for the Harrison County Board of Supervisors and School District for 18 and 15 years, respectively. In 1969 and 1970, he was elected President of the State bar association in Mississippi. In 1995, he received the Outstanding Achievement in Law Award from the Mississippi State Bar Association. An autobiographical video, titled Trailblazers of the Mississippi Legal Frontier, was produced to document his legal career.

In 1975, Holleman began an acting career, which led him to perform on stage, in movies, and in television series. Holleman had a starring role in The Ponder Heart, a movie based on a book by Eudora Welty and was an active member of the Screen Actors Guild. In 1976, Holleman was interviewed about his distinguished legal career as part of the Mississippi Oral History Program.

Following his death from cancer, Holleman was buried in Floral Hills Memorial Gardens, Gulfport, Mississippi.

== Partial filmography ==
- The Beast Within (1982) - Doc Odom
- Stone Cold (1991) - County Judge
- A Simple Twist of Fate (1994) - Politician #1
- Cries of Silence (1996) - Judge Ladner
