= Trinity Episcopal Church (Hattiesburg, Mississippi) =

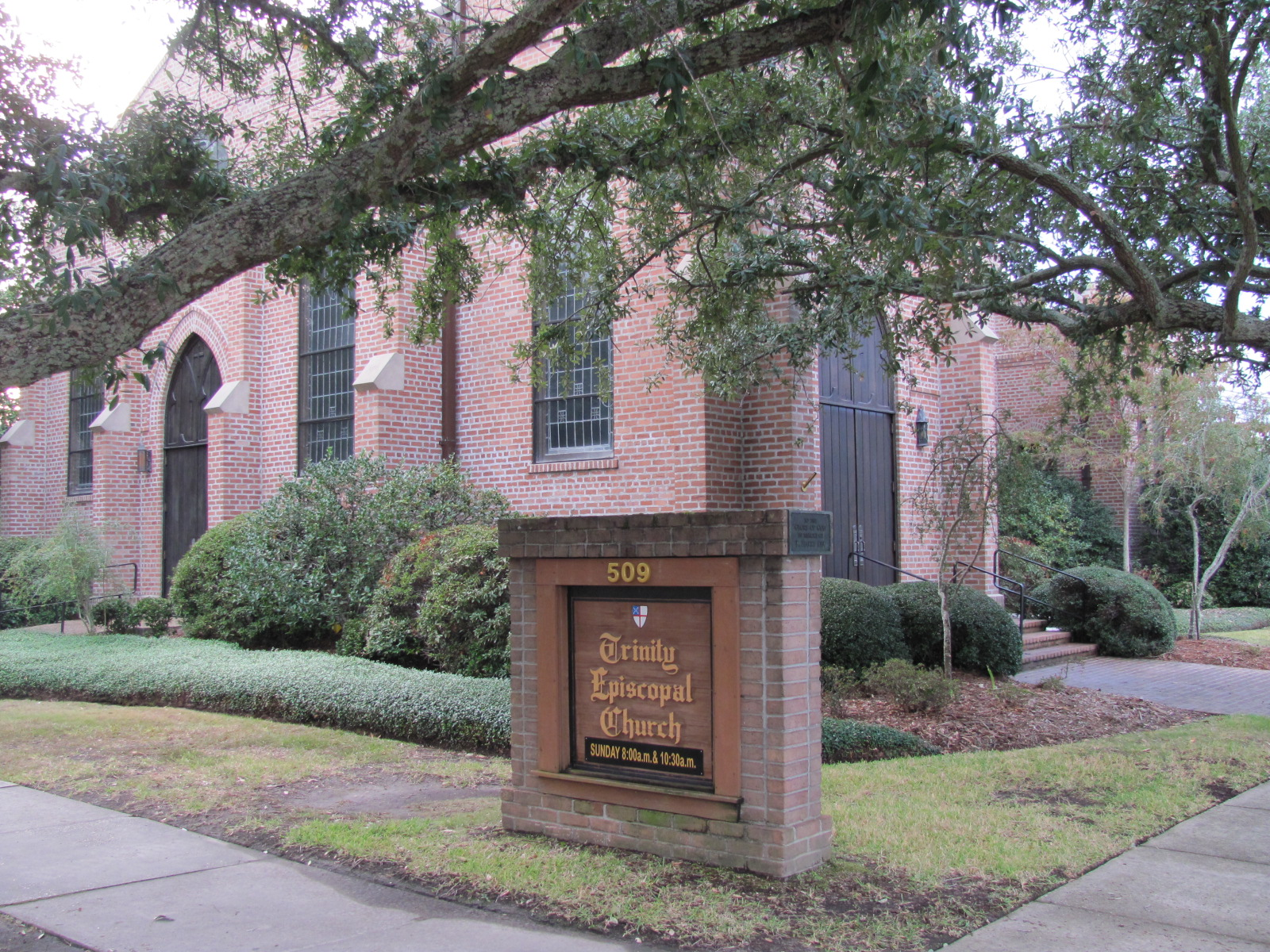
- Trinity Episcopal Church c. 1912
- Trinity Episcopal Church
- 31.323693°N 89.294927°W
- Location: Hattiesburg, Mississippi
- Country: United States
- Denomination: Episcopal Church
- Website: www.trinityhattiesburg.org

Architecture
- Heritage designation: Mississippi Department of Archives and History Historic Property
- Designated: 2007

Trinity Episcopal Church is an historic church located at 509 West Pine Street in Hattiesburg, Mississippi, located in Forrest County. The church is in the Oaks Historic District which is listed on the National Register of Historic Places listings in Forrest County, Mississippi. It is a member of the Episcopal Diocese of Mississippi. This building was built in 1912, reputedly by the rector of the church, the Reverend William Smith Simpson-Atmore, and was included on the Mississippi Department of Archives and History's List of Historic Churches of Mississippi in 2007.

== History ==
Trinity Episcopal Church of Hattiesburg was modeled after a Knights Templar church in London, England. The church began in 1895 with the first recorded service of the congregation and in July 1901, Trinity Mission was organized during a meeting at the Forrest County Courthouse. The congregation was then adopted into the Mississippi Diocese at the Diocesan Council the following April, 1902. Church services during those first years were held at the Forrest County Courthouse and then later at the First Presbyterian Church of Hattiesburg until 1902 when the congregation built a wooden frame church on Buschman Street on a parcel of land acquired in 1899.
