= Fruitland Park, Mississippi =

- Unincorporated community
- Location within the state of Mississippi
- Coordinates: 30°54′58″N 89°10′16″W
- Country: United States
- State: Mississippi
- County: Forrest
- Time zone: UTC-6 (Central (CST))
  - Summer (DST): UTC-5 (CDT)
- GNIS feature ID: 693273

Fruitland Park is a small unincorporated community in southern Forrest County, Mississippi. It is part of the Hattiesburg, Mississippi Metropolitan Statistical Area. Camp Tiak, a Boy Scouts of America camp with a one-mile educational forest trail, is located in Fruitland Park.

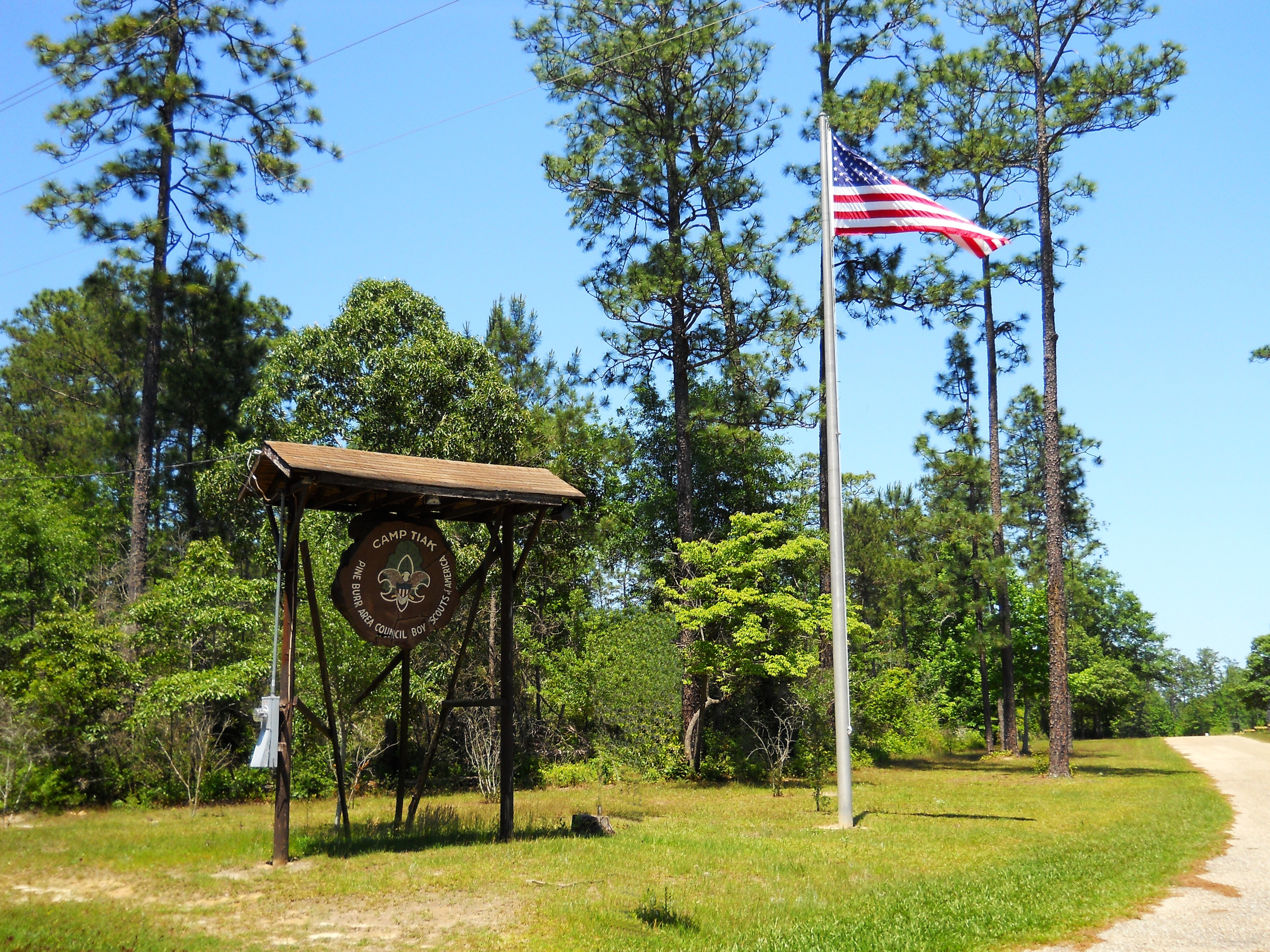
Entrance to Camp Tiak

== History ==
The land that Fruitland Park occupies was previously owned by the J. E. North Lumber Company. The F. B. Mills Farm Company of Syracuse, New York bought the land in 1913 for the purpose of growing figs. The area eventually became a fruit and trucking center. Fruitland Park is located on the former Gulf and Ship Island Railroad.

A post office operated under the name Fruitland Park from 1915 to 1976.

One of the early settlers was Mr. John A. Nicholson. Mr. Nicholson served in the Second Boer War and in an honor guard during the coronation of King Edward VII.

== Education ==
- Forrest County Agricultural High School
- South Forrest Attendance Center (K-8)

== Transportation ==
Fruitland Park is served by U.S. Route 49, which runs north-south through Mississippi and Arkansas.

== Notable person ==
- Boyce Holleman, actor, aviator, lawyer

== See also ==
New York Hotel
