= New York Hotel (Novocherkassk) =

Russian Hotel in Rostov Oblast

Coordinates: 47.2440°N 40.0642°E

- Гостиница «Нью-Йорк»
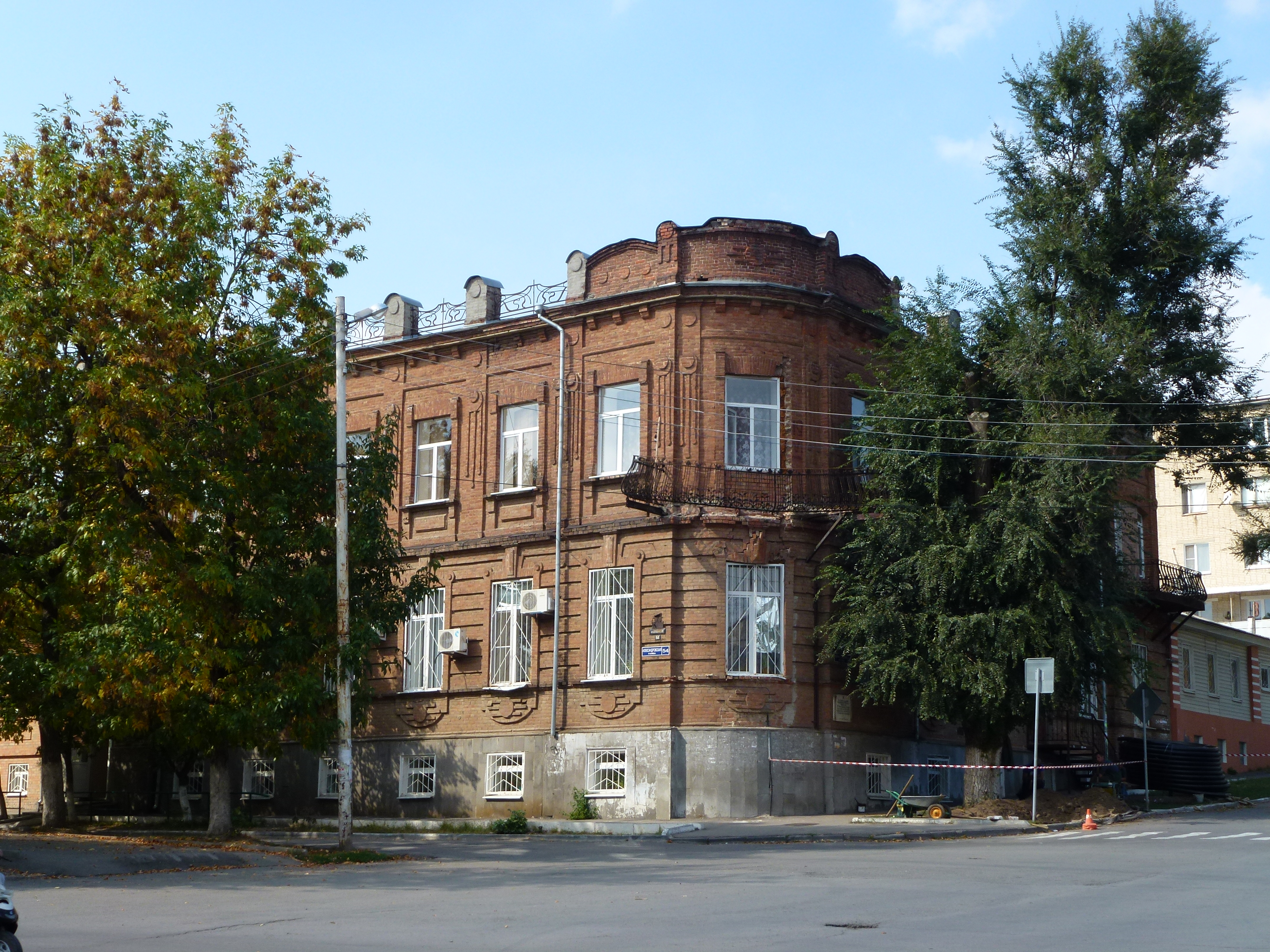
- Established: 1890s
- Location: Novocherkassk, Rostov Oblast, Russia
- Type: Hotel

The New York Hotel (Russian: Гостиница «Нью-Йорк») is a building in Novocherkassk, Rostov Oblast, Russia. It is officially declared as an object of cultural heritage of Russia.

== History ==
The building was constructed in the end of the 19th century. Before the Revolution of 1917 the facade of the house was decorated in a different way compared to how it looks now, and the interior space was distinguished by a rich interior. On the wall of the house there is a memorial plaque that read that on February 13, 1943, a red banner was set here by the soldiers of the 2nd Guards Army, when Novocherkassk was liberated from German invaders. After the end of World War II, the building housed a secondary school and later a psychoneurological dispensary. In 1992, the house was recognized as an object of cultural heritage and an architectural monument.

== Architecture ==
The style of the New York Hotel resembles that of many other buildings in Novocherkassk that were built in the same period, e. g. Golden Anchor Hotel. The building is located on the corner of two streets and at some time it had a strong impact on their development. The hotel was built of red brick. At the level of the second floor of the house there is an external balcony with twisted iron railing. Two-storey house with a basement was built in the Art Nouveau style. This is clearly shown by the design of the parapet, the pilaster, and by the outlook of the windows and the lattice of balconies.
