= Madison Walthall =

American politician

Member of the California State Legislature
- Incumbent
- Assumed office November 13, 1849
- Constituency: San Joaquin County

Personal details
- Born: October 19, 1792 Prince Edward County, Virginia, United States
- Died: June 15, 1868 (aged 75) Stockton, California, United States
- Party: Nonpartisan
- Spouse(s): Mary Anne Wilson (m. 1823), Elizabeth Frances Burfoot (m. 1834), Sarah Davis
- Occupation: Politician, civil servant, tax collector, soldier

Madison Walthall Sr. (October 19, 1792 – June 15, 1848) was an American politician, civil servant, and soldier. He served in the United States Army during the Mexican–American War, and later held office in the California State Legislature.

Madison was born in Prince Edward County, Virginia to parents John Wathall and Catherine Madison. He had one child with his first wife, Mary Anne Wilson; and two children with his second wife, Elizabeth Frances Burfoot. Walthall had enslaved Edmond Edward Wysinger (c. 1816–1891), and brought him to California.

In the 1850s, he served as the tax collector at the Port of Stockton. Walthall died in Stockton, California.
