= Eaton Elementary School (Hattiesburg, Mississippi) =

Historic place in Mississippi, United States

- U.S. National Register of Historic Places
- Mississippi Landmark
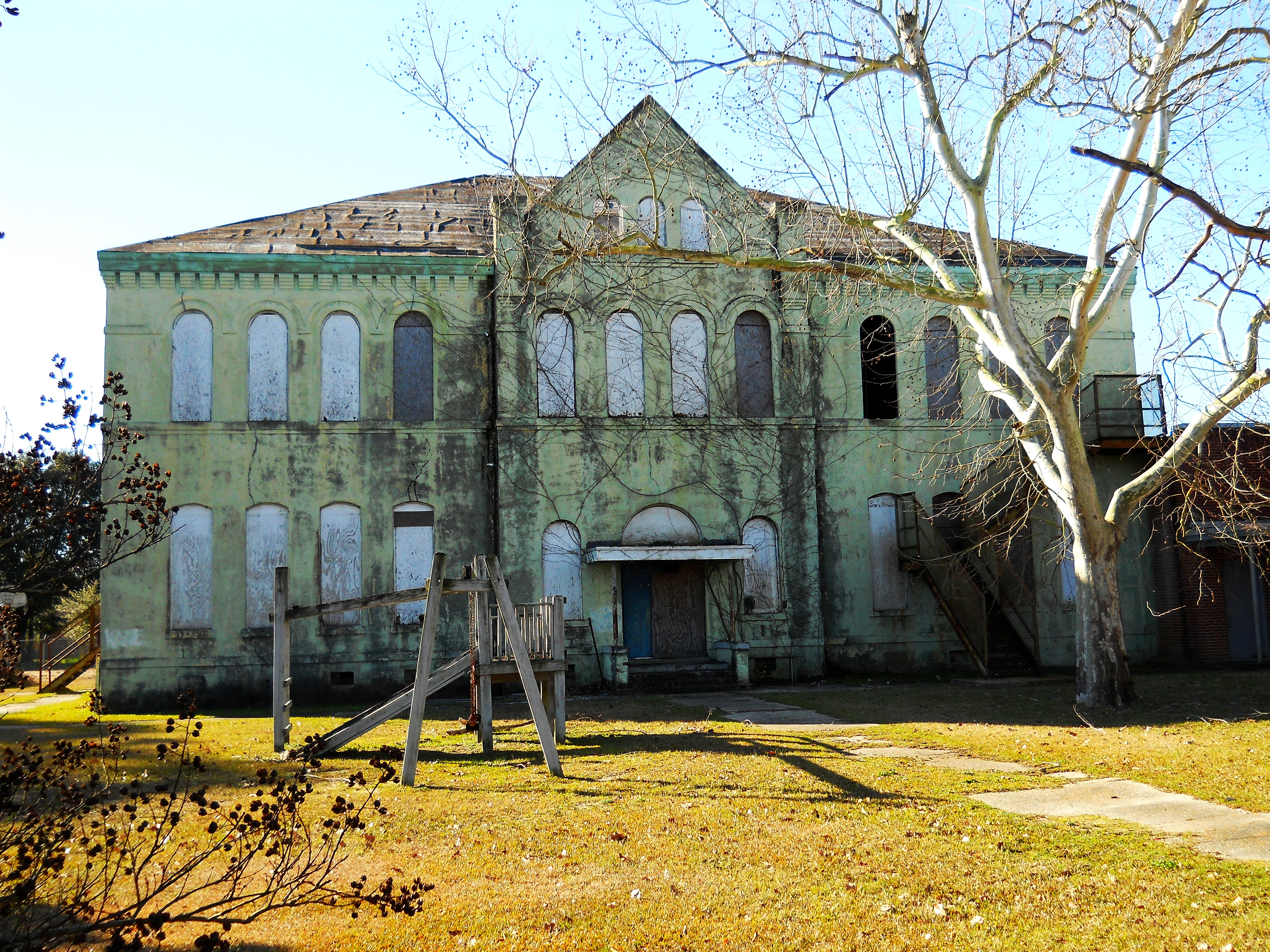
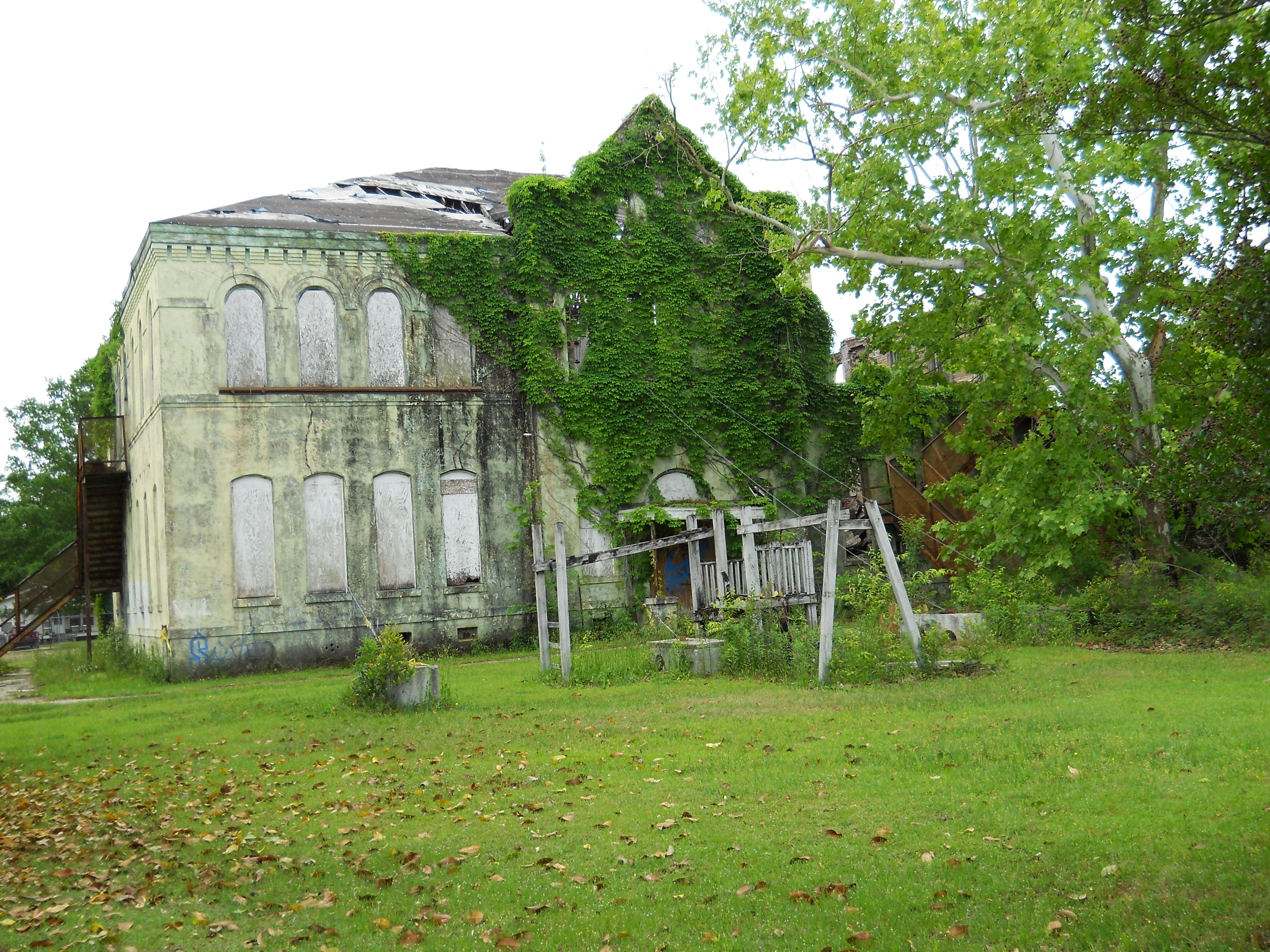
- 2013 2021 North facade

- Location within Mississippi Location within the United States
- Location: 1105 McInnis Ave., Hattiesburg, Mississippi
- Coordinates: 31°19′26″N 89°16′50″W
- Built: 1905
- Architect: Robert E. Lee (1905), Hearon & McCleskey (1949)
- Architectural style: Romanesque
- NRHP reference No.: 08000676
- USMS No.: 035-HAT-0377-NR-ML

Significant dates
- Added to NRHP: July 16, 2008
- Designated USMS: June 07, 1991

Eaton Elementary School, also known as Third Ward School, is located at 1105 McInnis Ave. in Hattiesburg, Mississippi, United States. It was utilized as a public school building from 1905 until the late 1980s. The building was designated a Mississippi Landmark in 1991. It was placed on the National Register of Historic Places in 2008.

== Description ==
The original Eaton School building is a two-story brick structure with a 12-bay front facade that contains round-arch window frames and a hip roof, previously covered with asphalt shingles. A stucco finish was applied to the brick outer walls at an unspecified date. The ground-level entrance on the north facade was topped with a round-arch transom. A steel fire escape for the second floor is mounted on the west end of the front facade.

The south facade was less ornate, with an entrance door on the first floor flanked by 4 arched window frames on the east end and 10 windows in arched frames on the second floor. The east elevation contains 7 arched window frames on the first and second floors. The center window frame on the second floor of the east elevation contains a metal door for accessing a steel fire escape. The west elevation was modified in 1949 by a one-story cafeteria addition.

Both floors of the 1905 building were subdivided into four classrooms, off a central hallway. Plastered walls had beadboard wainscotting at the height of the window sills. Ceilings were also beadboard.

== History ==
The original building is believed to have been designed by Hattiesburg architect Robert E. Lee and was constructed in 1905. The building's Romanesque Revival architectural style was common in early 20th century school designs, but Eaton School is considered by the Mississippi Department of Archives and History (MDAH) to be a unique example of the architecture because the building has survived intact for more than 100 years. The school's name was derived from an early settler, George Eaton, who donated the land where the school was built.

In 1949, a one-story, flat-roof, brick addition was constructed on the west end of the original building, under the direction of architects Hearon & McCleskey. It contained three classrooms and a cafeteria/meeting space with a stage. In 1957, a one-story, flat-roof, brick auditorium addition, designed by Associated School Architects, was constructed and connected to the stage from the earlier addition.

== Deterioration ==
By the late 1980s, the original building no longer served as a public school. When it was assessed for National Register status during the first decade of the 21st century, deferred maintenance had resulted in a leaking roof.

To prevent further deterioration and begin restoration, a new roof was contracted through open bidding. The roofing project began in November 2009, but had to be redone three times to correctly match the pitch of the original roof, as required by MDAH, to meet historic specifications. By March 2010, the roofing project was nearing completion. But, during that 5-month interval, the building's interior had been exposed to winter rains which weakened the supporting beams on the second floor. A portion of the second floor collapsed and caused a substantial structural crack in the building, thereby leaving the building structurally unsound for the roof to be completed.

By 2015, a portion of the roof framing and part of the second story wall had collapsed. Two-ton concrete anchors were used with cables attached to the exterior walls to brace the structure. The City of Hattiesburg and MDAH provided funding to stabilize the school building, and the city intended to apply for grants to restore the structure.

Gallery photos illustrate the deterioration of the original building, with only the exterior walls visible as of September 2026.

== Gallery ==
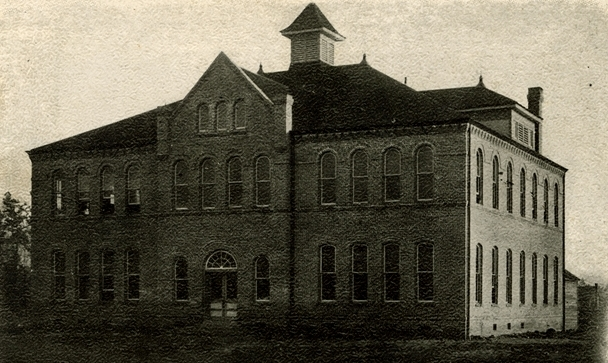
Eaton School as it appeared in the 1920s

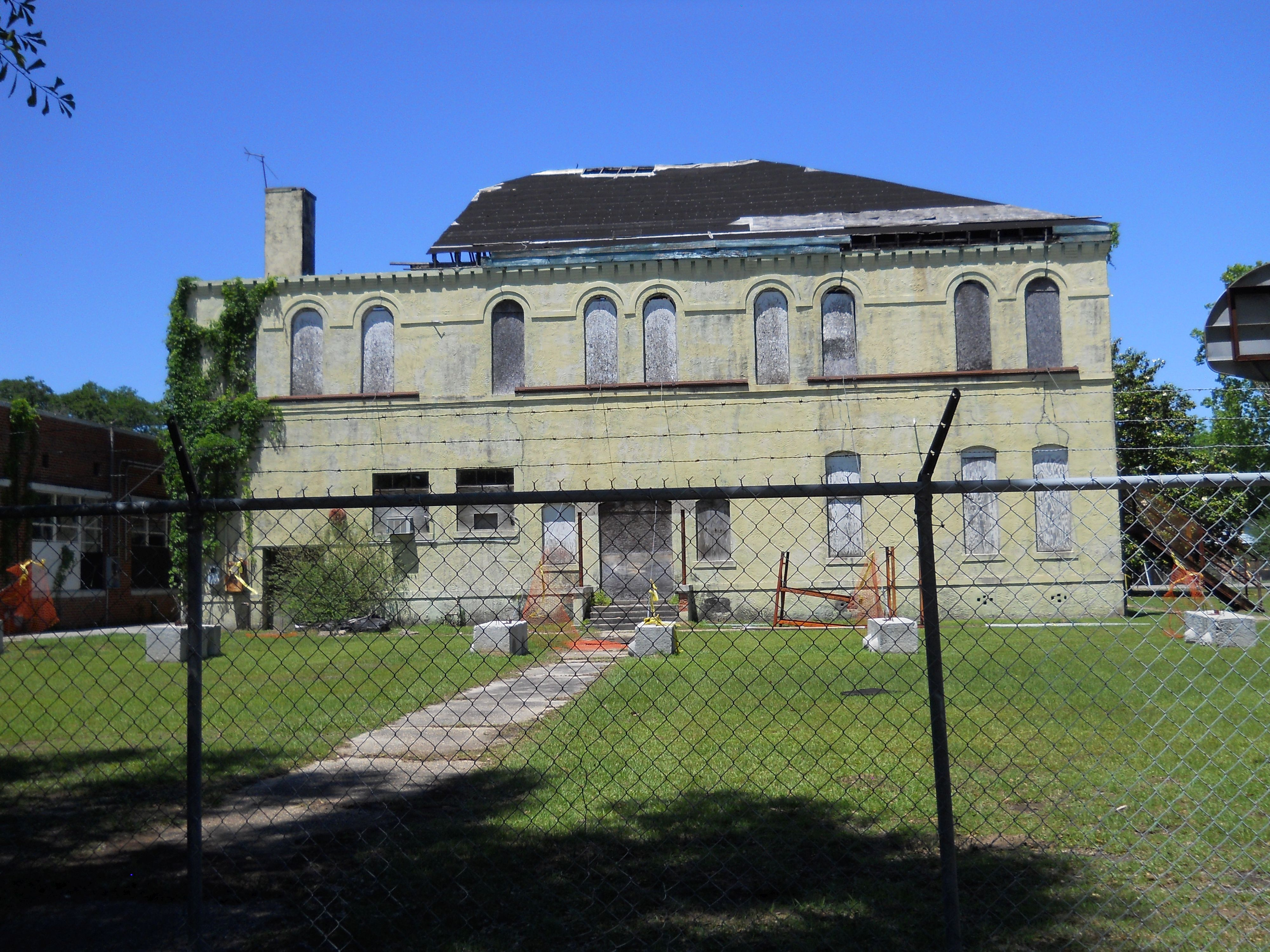
South elevation in 2017

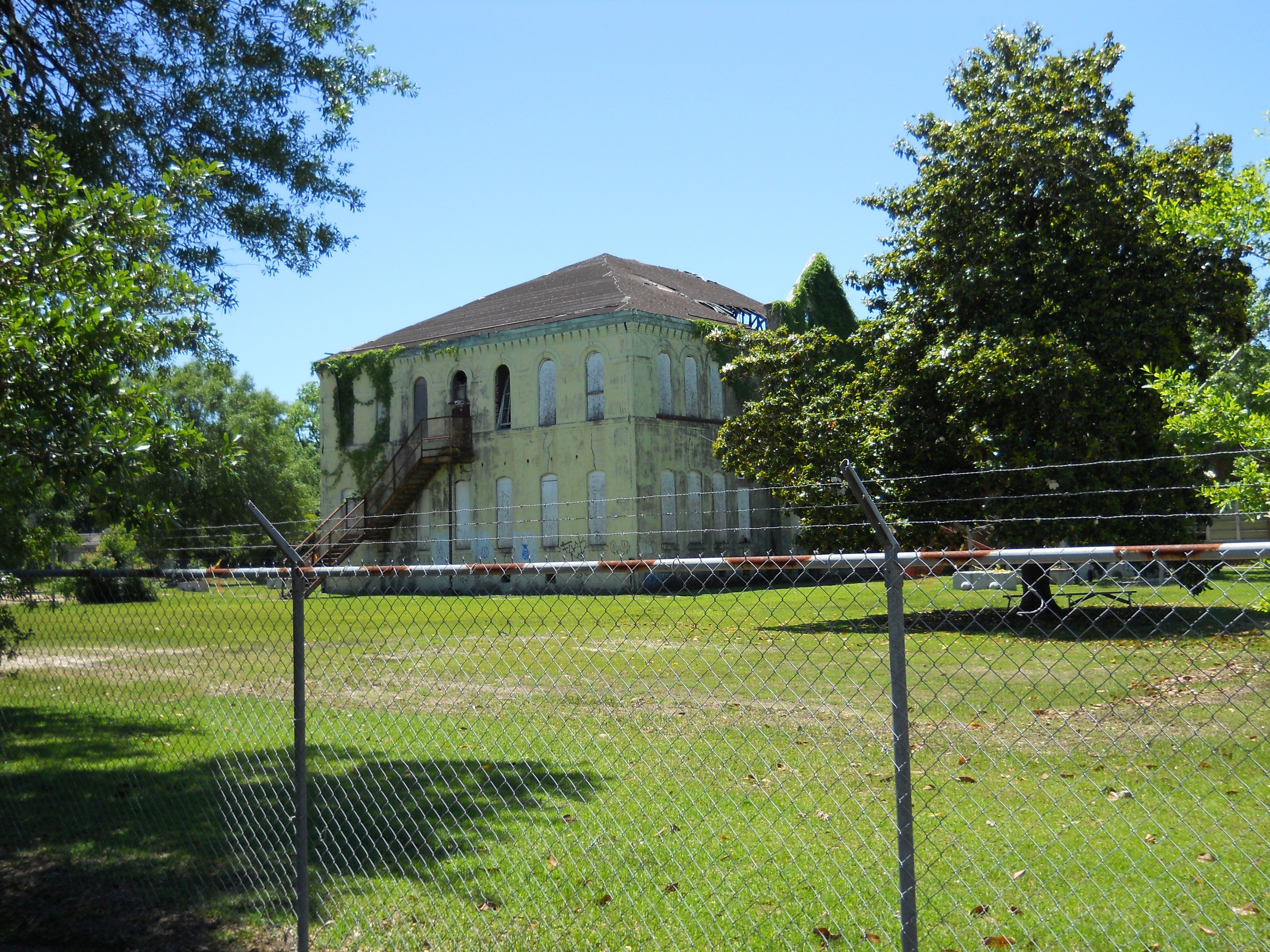
Northeast elevation in 2017

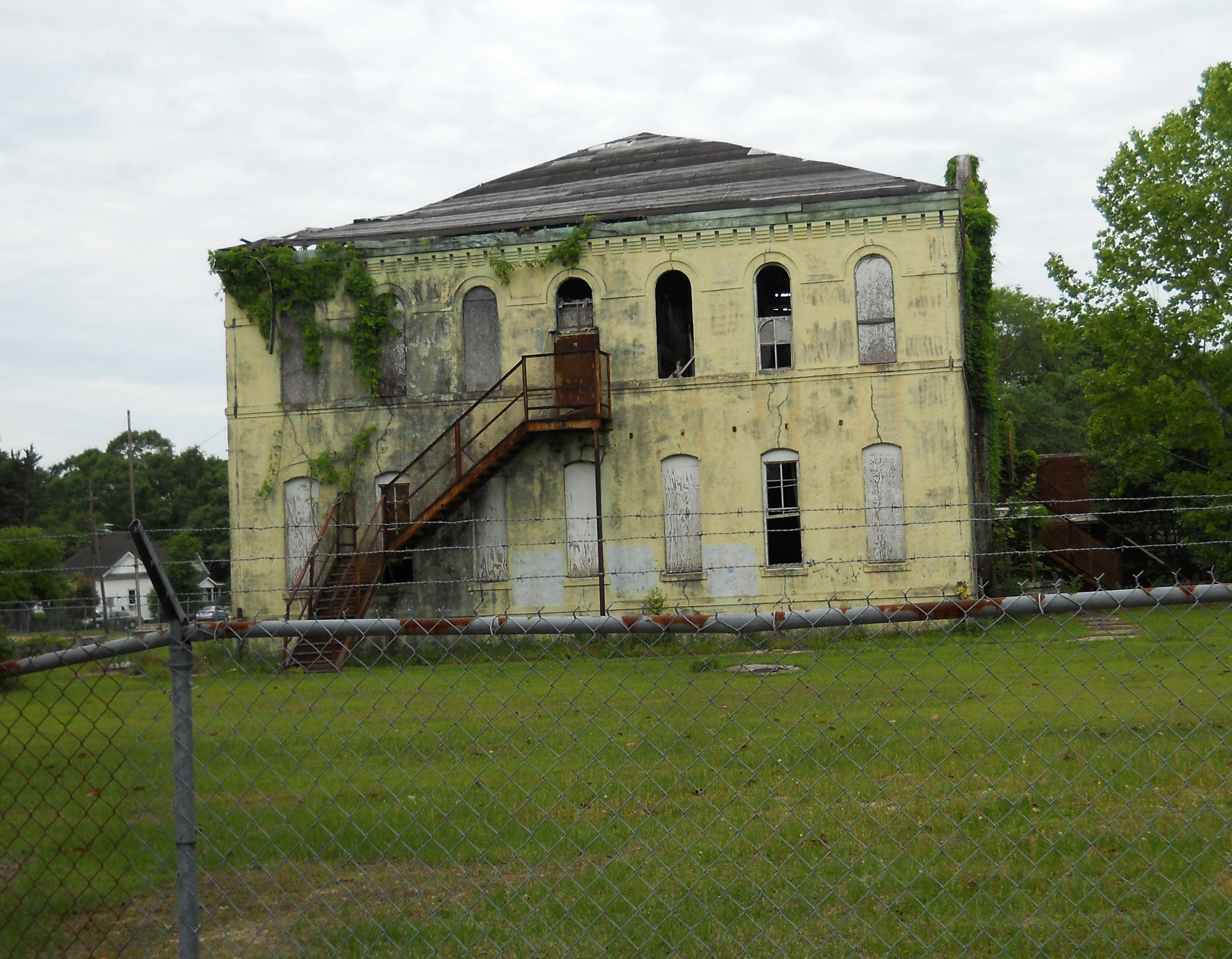
East elevation in 2021

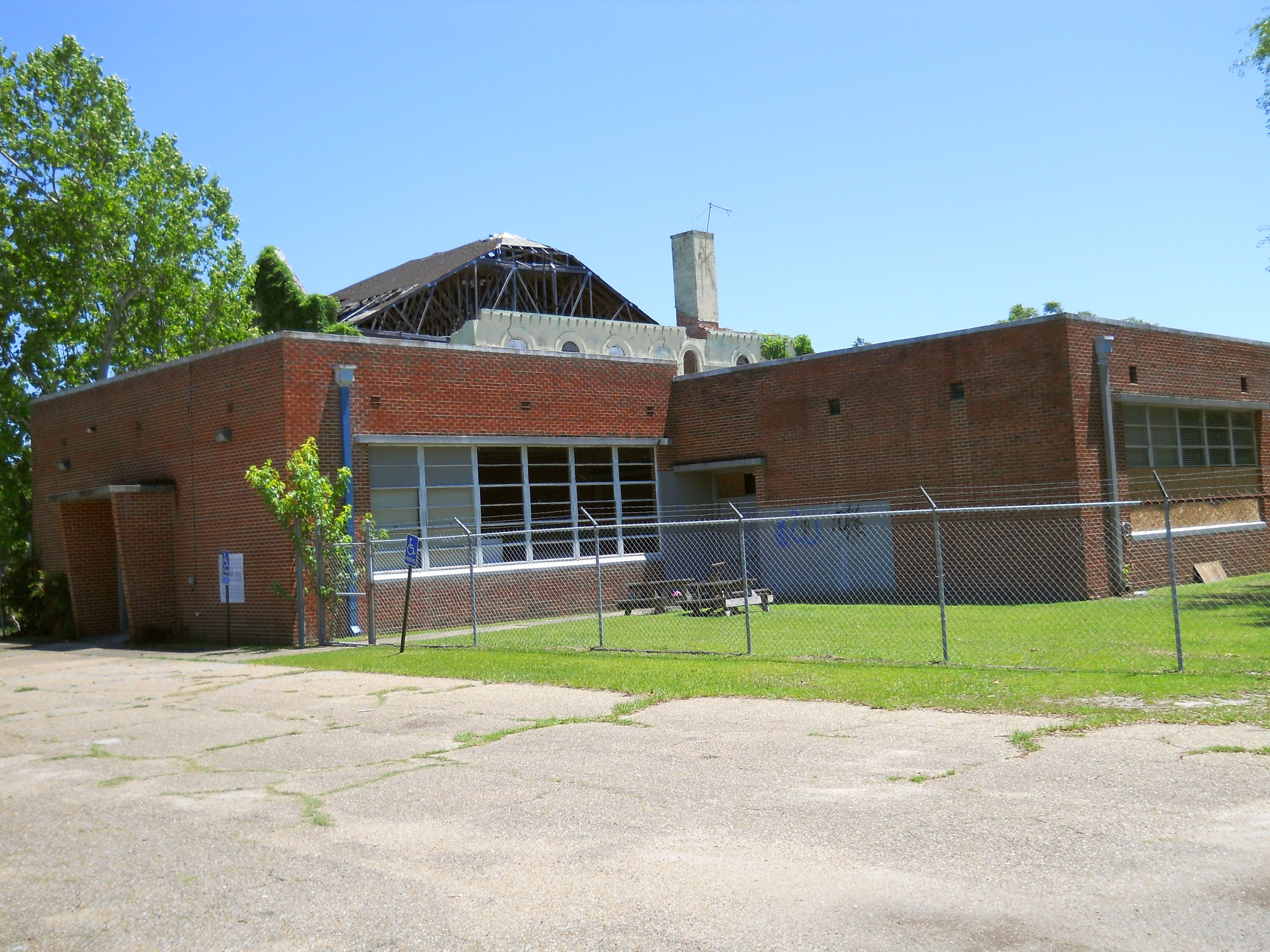
Additions (1957–left, 1949–right), northwest elevation in 2017

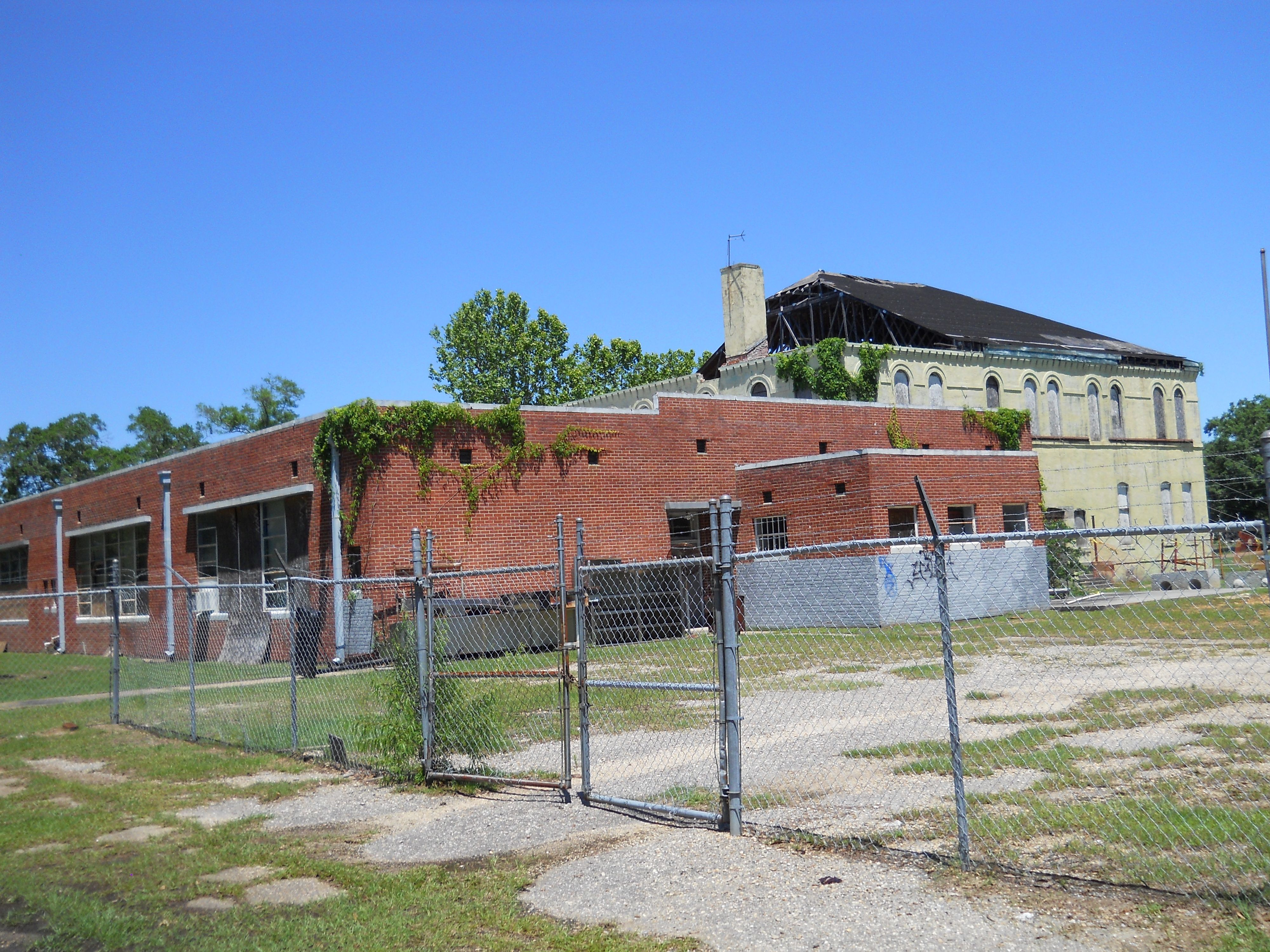
1949 addition (foreground), southwest elevation in 2017

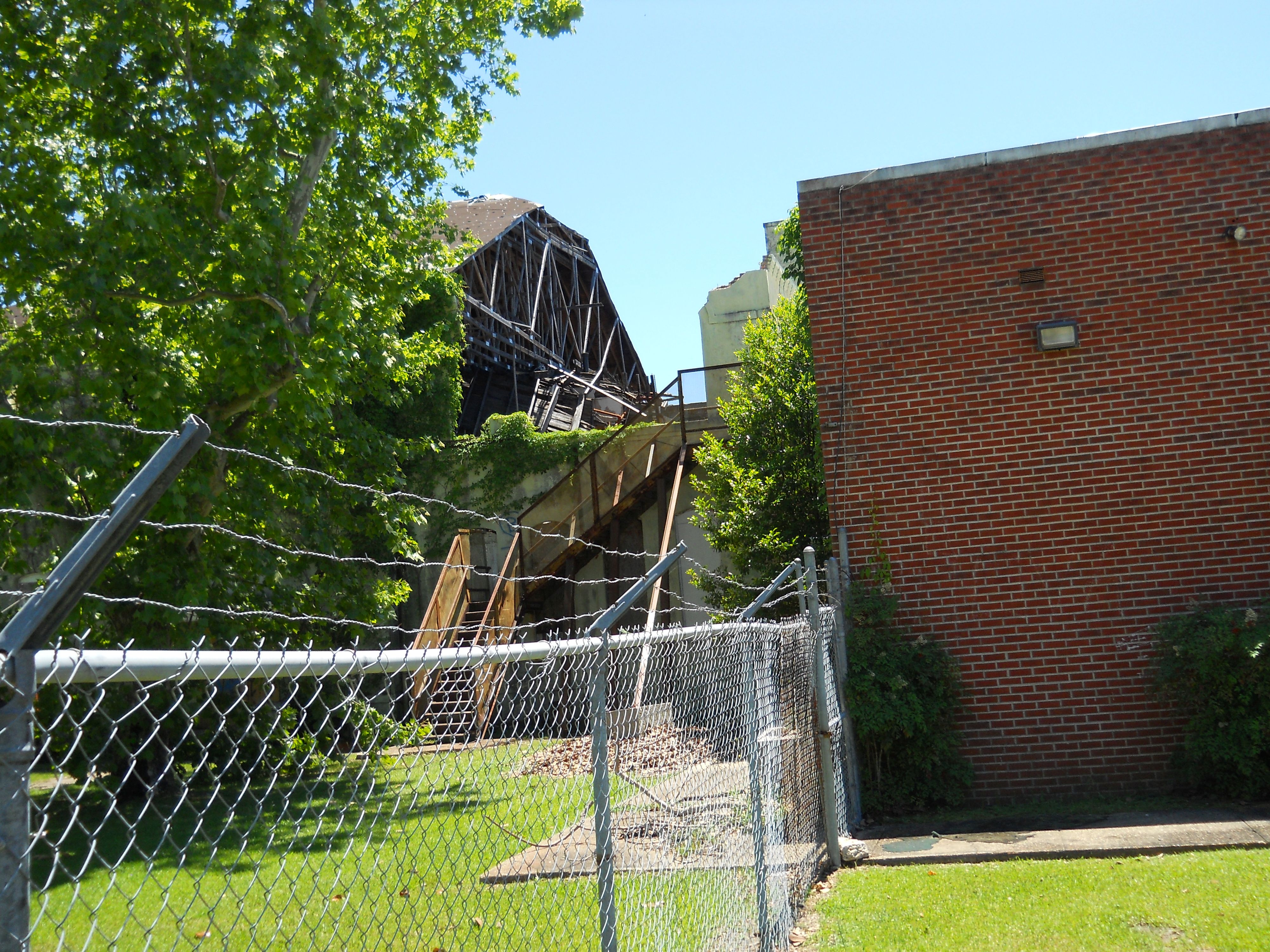
Northwest elevation roof collapse in 2017

Only the exterior walls were still standing as of September 2026
