= Mississippi Armed Forces Museum =

American military history museum

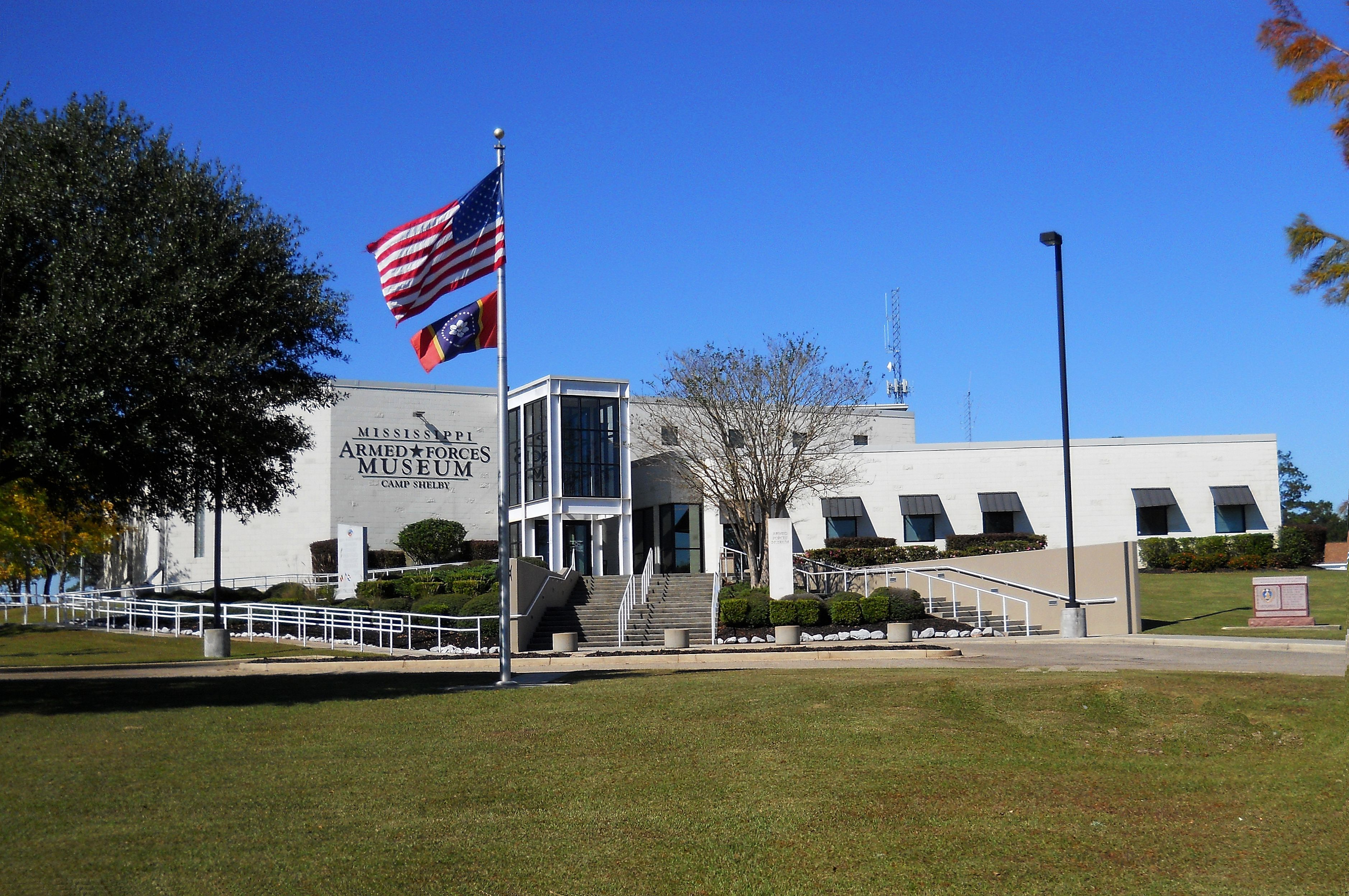
- Front facade 2021
- Established: 2001
- Location: Camp Shelby
- Coordinates: 31.19831°N 89.22372°W
- Visitors: 50,000 per year
- Director: Tommy Lofton (2019)

The Mississippi Armed Forces Museum is located at Camp Shelby, approximately 12 miles (19 km) south of Hattiesburg, Mississippi. The Armed Forces Museum serves as the military history museum for the State of Mississippi. It is a member of the Army Museum System.

== Museum objective ==
The purpose of the museum is to honor the service and sacrifices of Mississippi veterans from all military branches.

== Museum description ==
Two military veterans started the museum in 1984 with their personal collection of war artifacts. At that time, the museum was housed in a small room of a warehouse at Camp Shelby.

In 2001, a 23,000 ft^{2} (2,100 m^{2}) facility was completed. The museum contained 16,000 ft^{2} (1,500 m^{2}) of exhibits, 17,000 artifacts, 4,500 volumes of military history, and 2,000 historical documents.

In February 2015, the museum was closed for expansion. The expansion increased the museum space by 7,500 ft^{2} (700 m^{2}), added three new exhibition galleries, and remodeled older exhibits. The museum was officially reopened by the Governor of Mississippi on October 27, 2016.

== Museum exhibits ==
Within the museum building are eight galleries for viewing exhibits: late 19th century conflicts, World War I, World War II, Korean War, Vietnam War, Desert Storm, global war on terrorism, and Medal of Honor. Military weapons, equipment, clothing, and medals are on display.

Outdoor exhibits include aircraft, tanks, field artillery, and memorials.

== Gallery ==
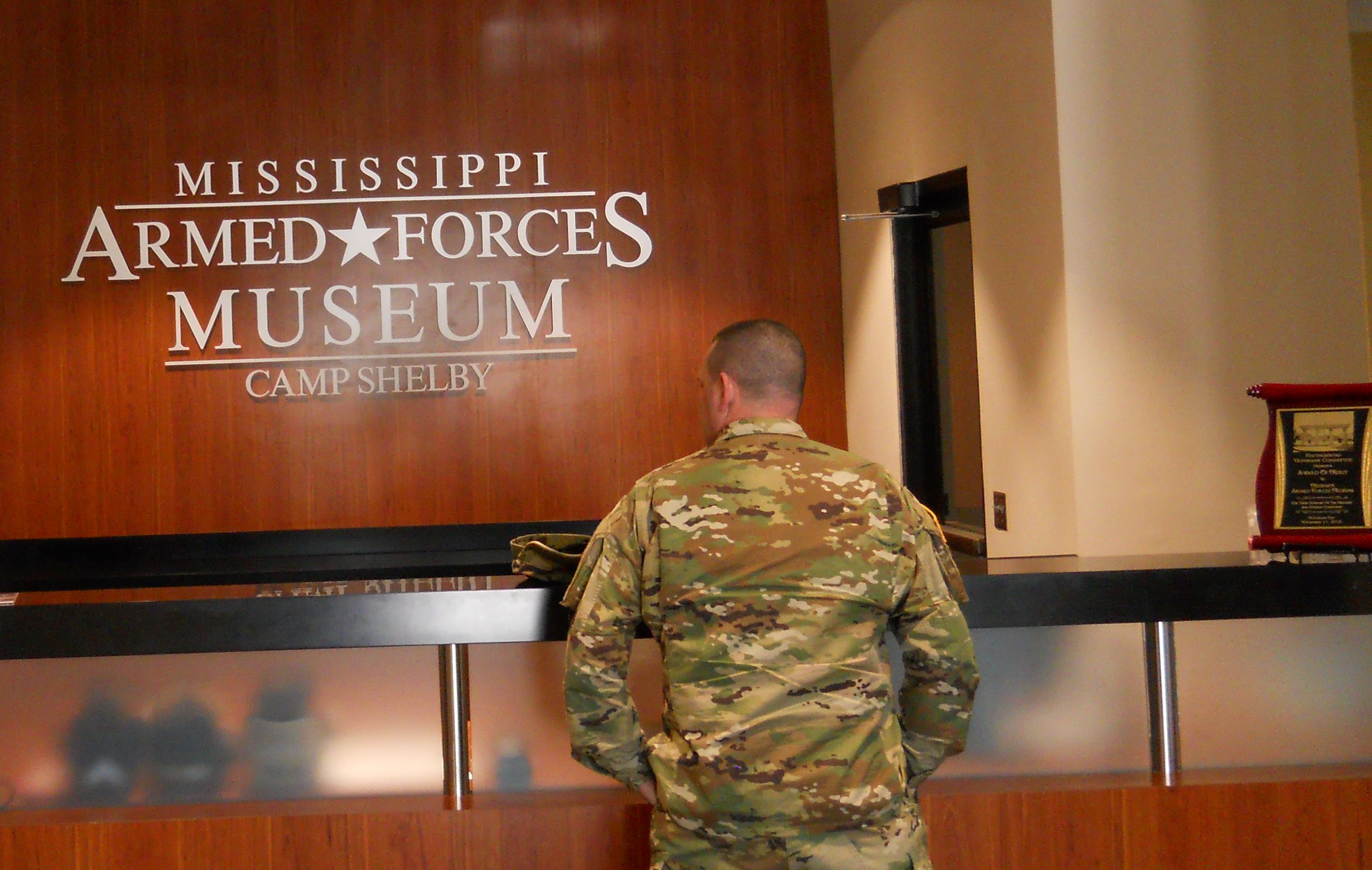
Museum entrance

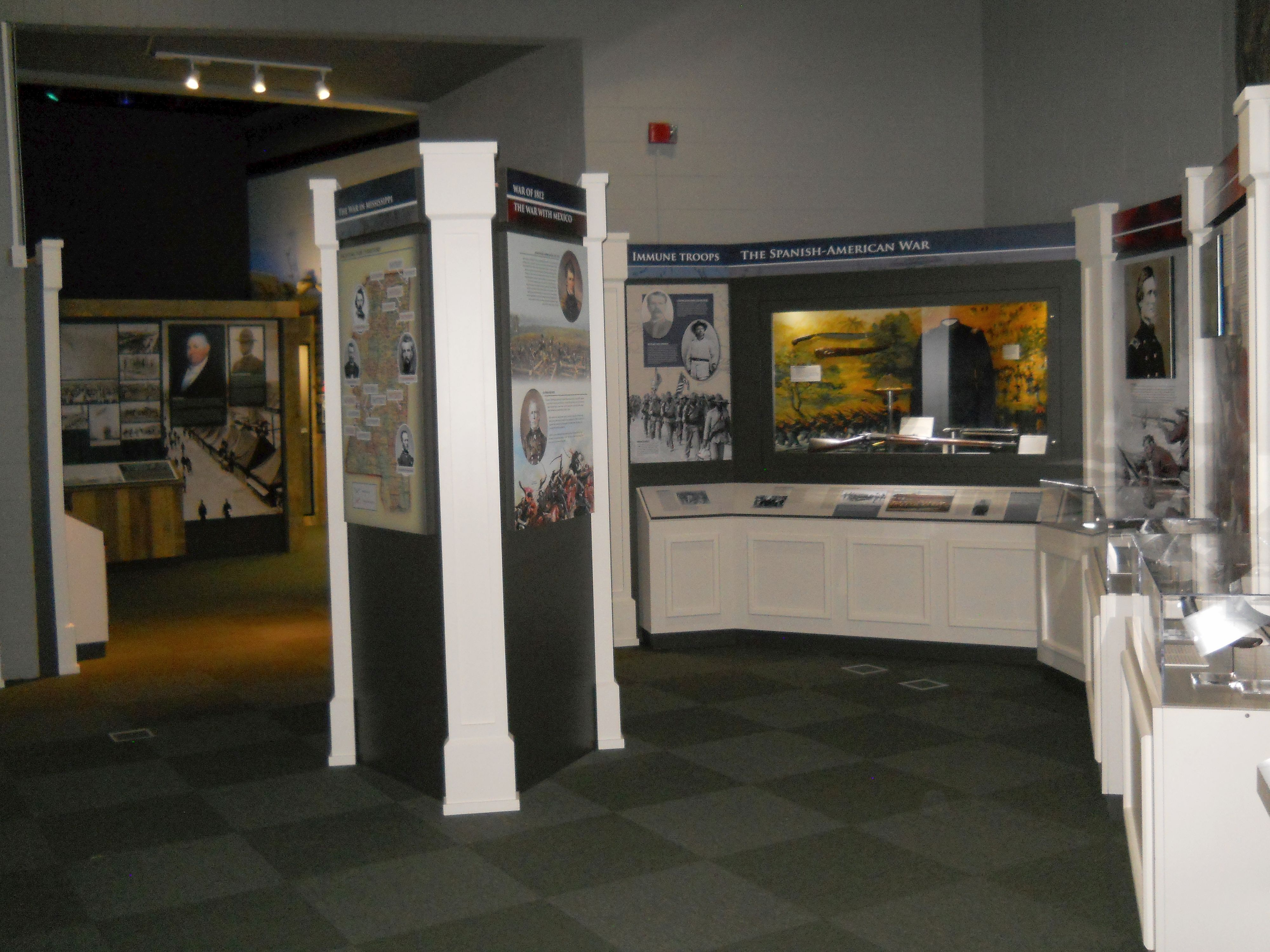
Exhibits of 19th-century conflicts

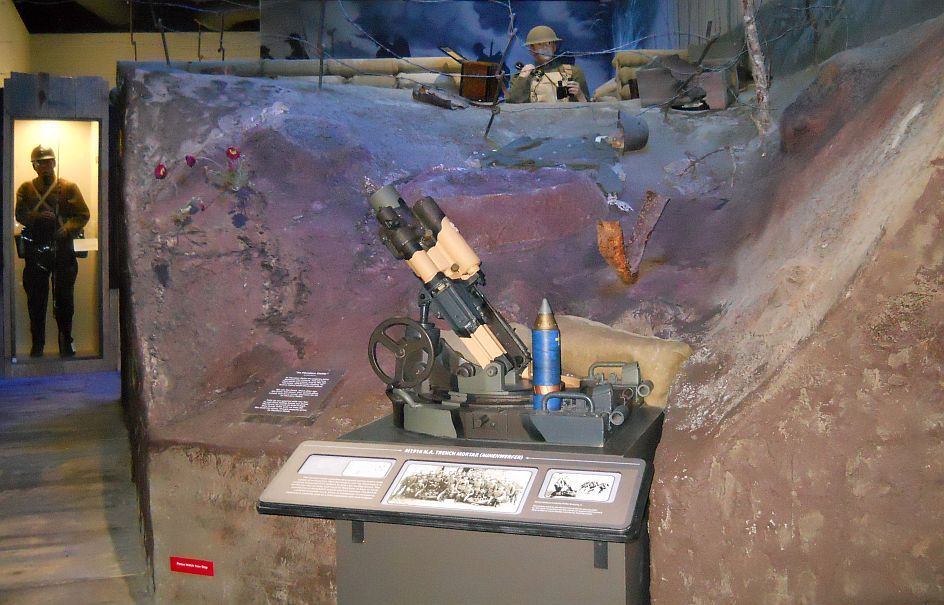
World War I exhibits

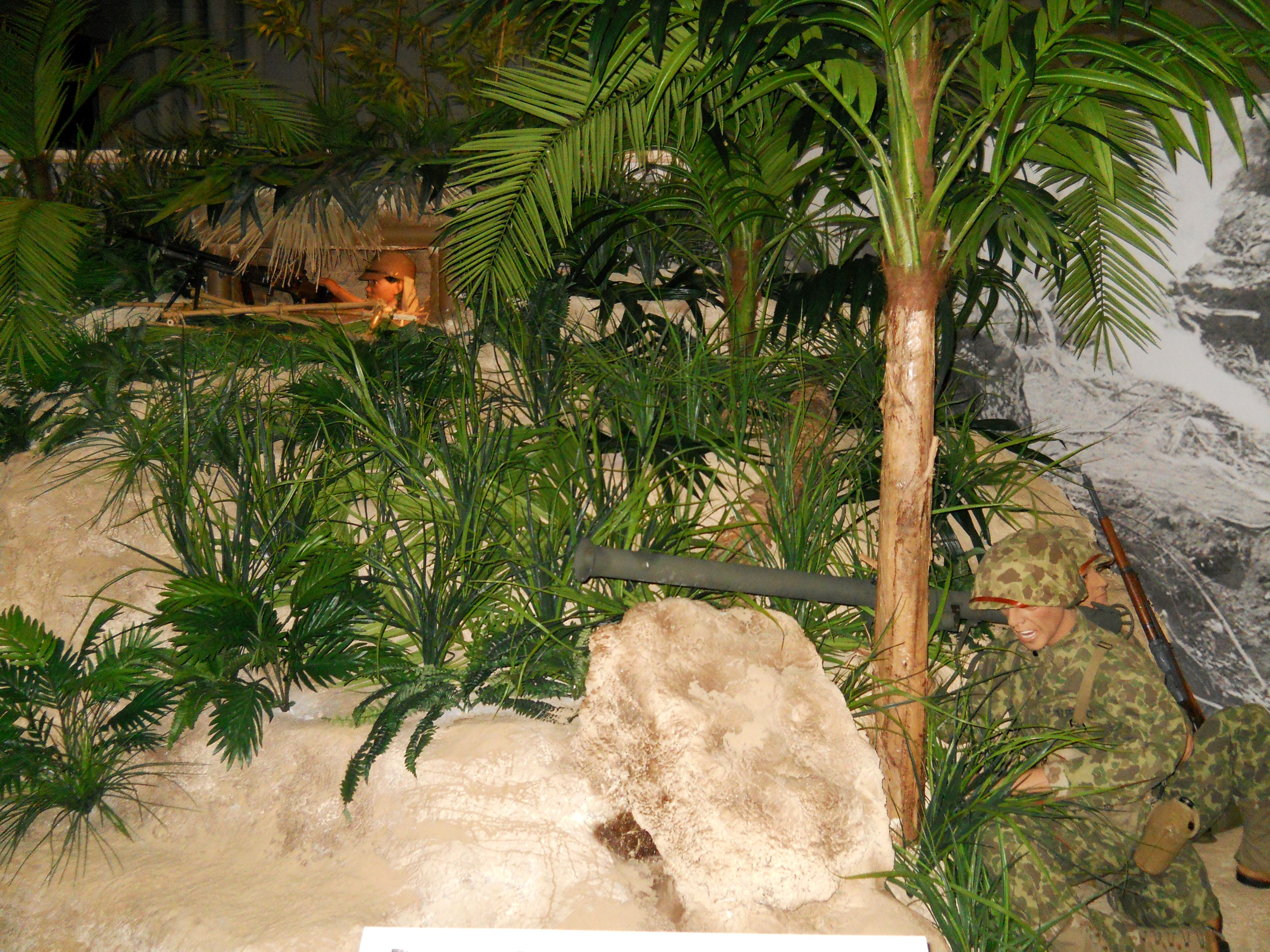
World War II exhibit

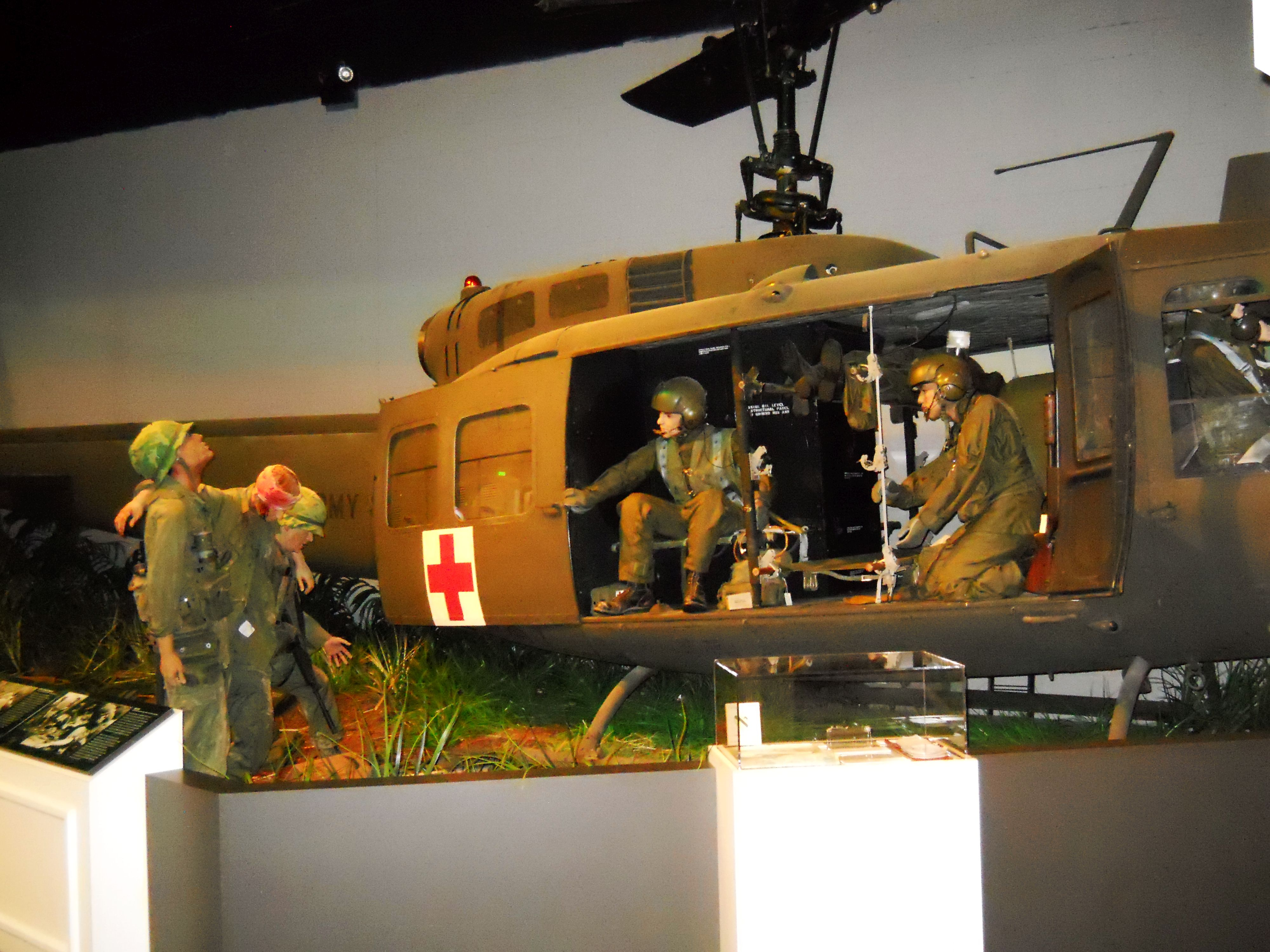
Vietnam War exhibit

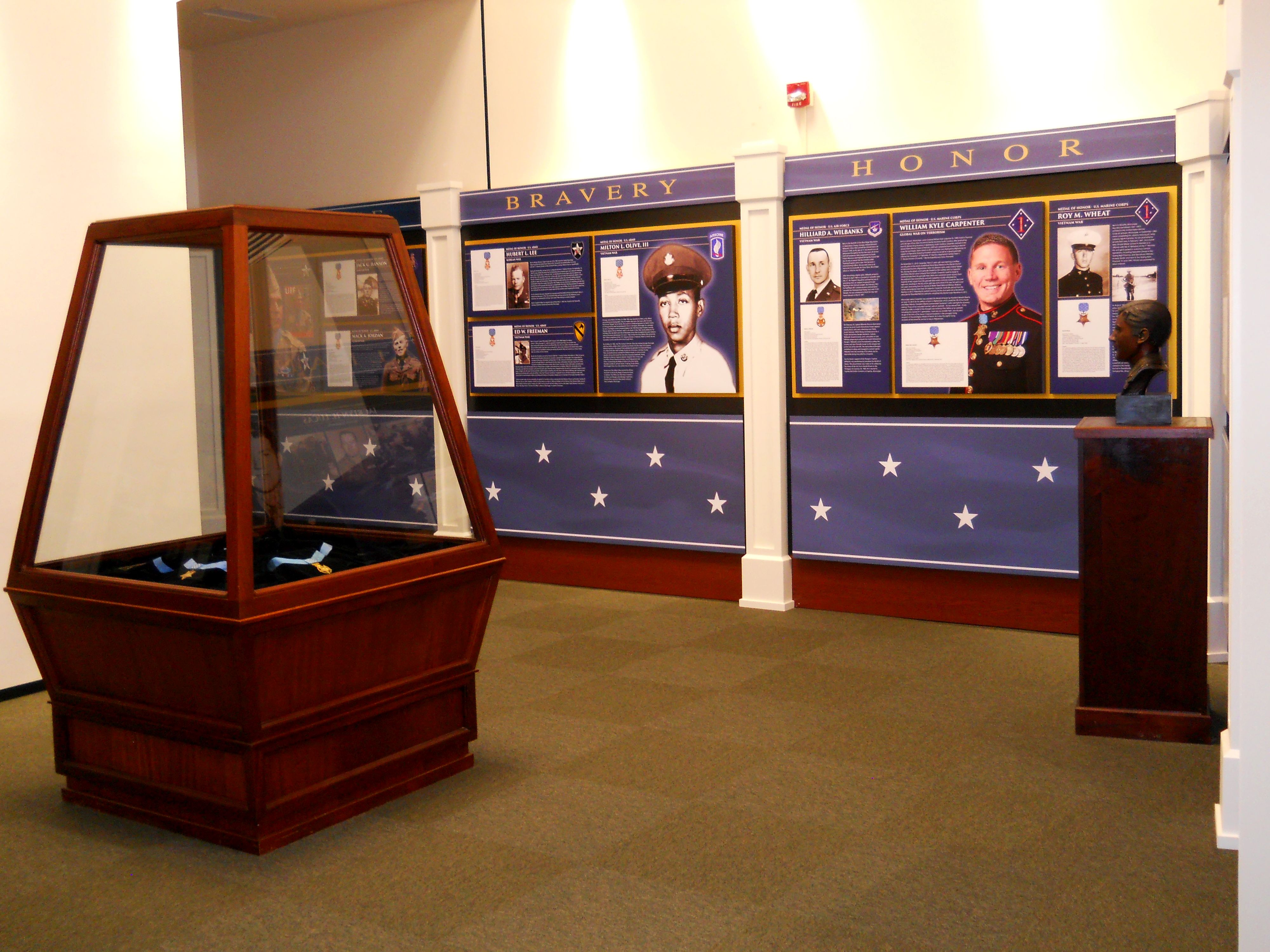
Medal of Honor exhibits

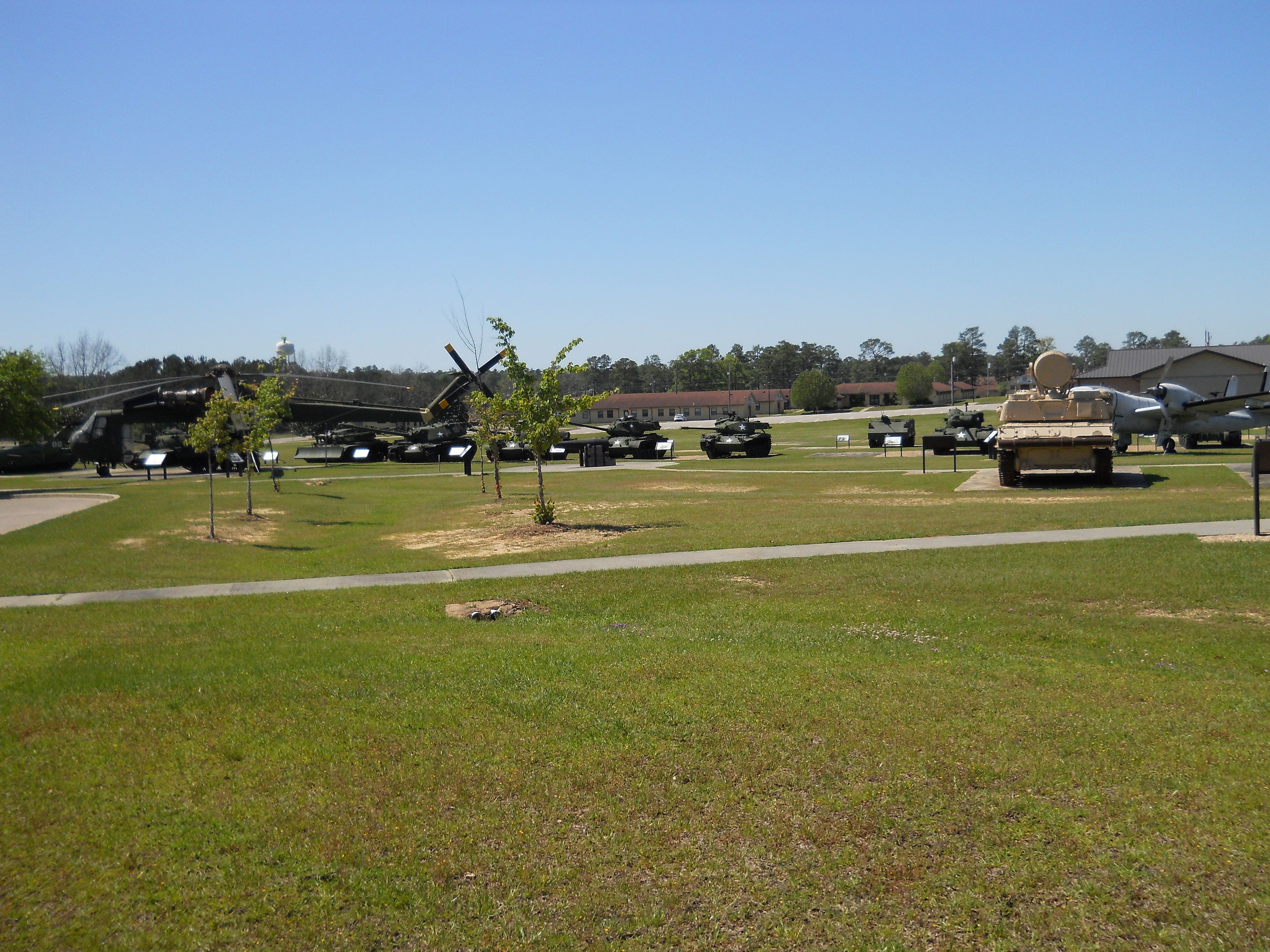
Outdoor exhibits

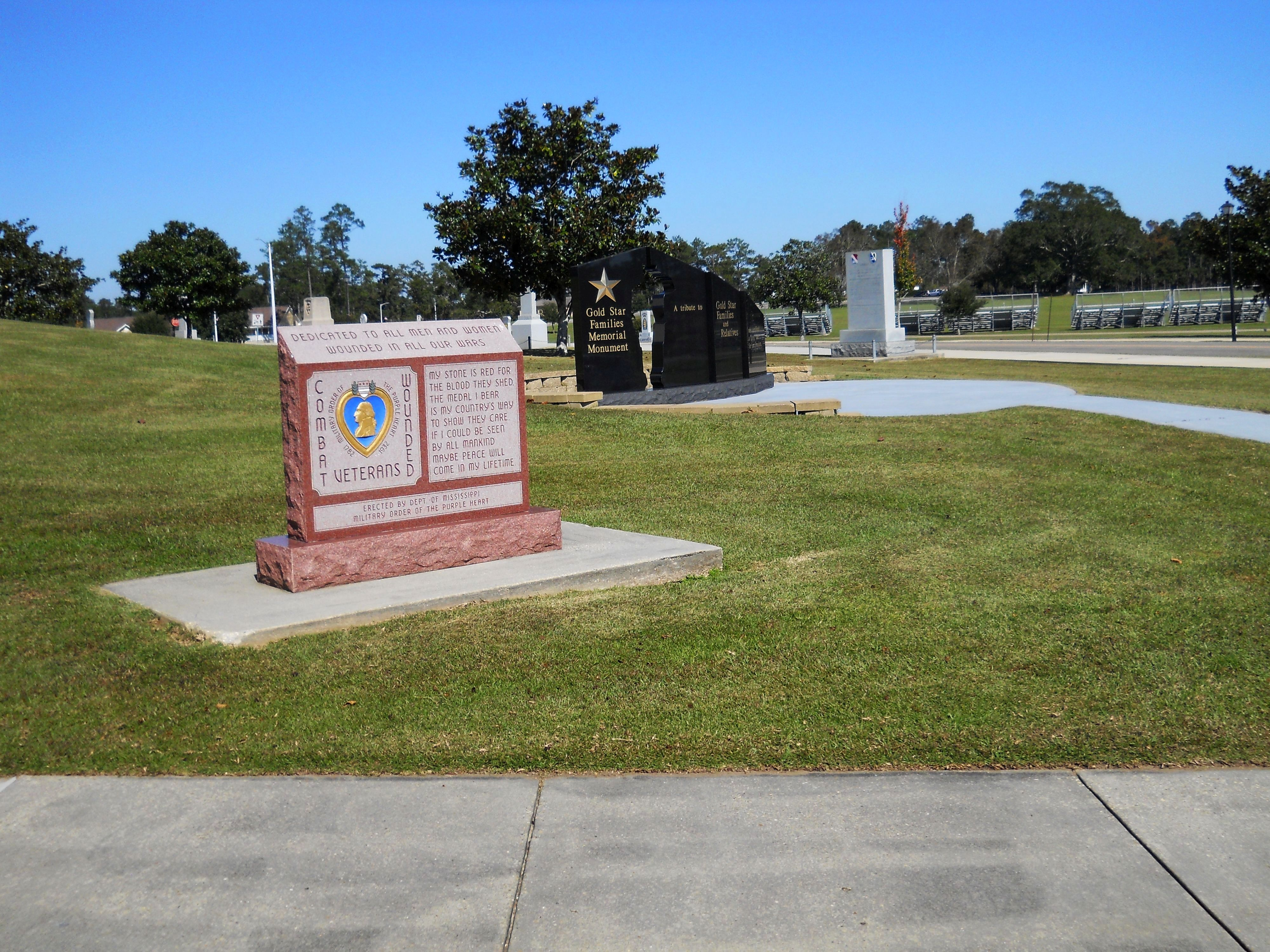
Memorials

== See also ==
- African American Military History Museum
