= New York Hotel (Fruitland Park, Mississippi) =

- U.S. National Register of Historic Places
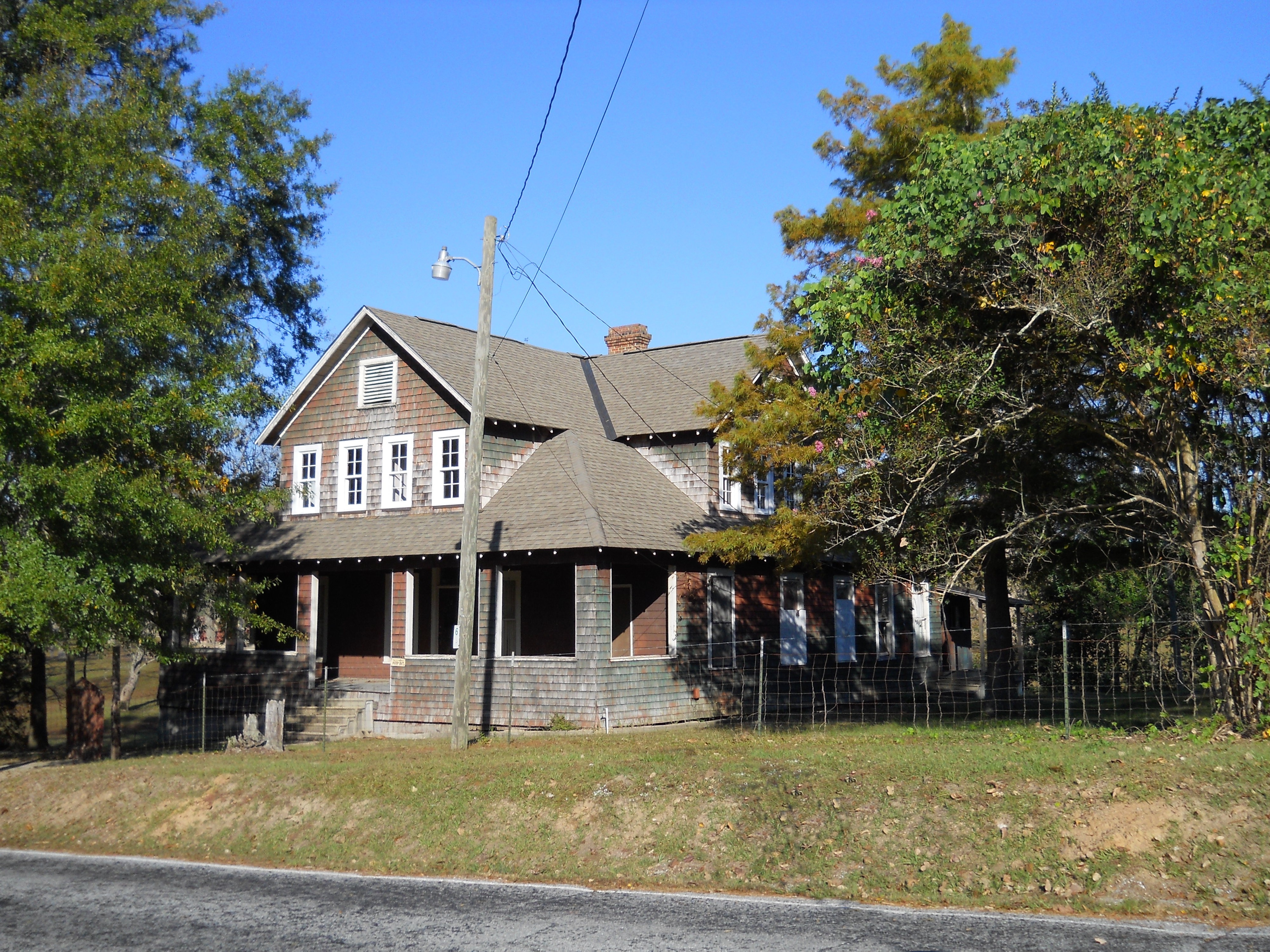
- New York Hotel, October 2011

- Location within Mississippi Location within the United States
- Location: 63 Fruitland Park Road, Fruitland Park, Mississippi
- Coordinates: 30°54′57.1″N 89°10′04.9″W
- Area: 4.3 acres (1.7 ha)
- Built: 1914
- Architectural style: Shingle
- NRHP reference No.: 99000383
- Added to NRHP: April 08, 1999

The New York Hotel is a historic hotel in Fruitland Park, Mississippi. Constructed in 1914, the building is a 1½ story, 12 bedroom, shingle-style structure containing 3600 square feet (334 square meters). It was added to the National Register of Historic Places in 1999.

== History ==
Establishment of the Fruitland Park community was part of an organized effort to convert cutover pinelands of south Mississippi into farms. Thousands of parcels of cutover land in the South were marketed to farmers in the midwestern and northeastern United States between 1900 and 1920. The New York Hotel operated from 1914 until 1919 to serve potential buyers of property in the planned community. Since most of the immigrant farm families returned to their homelands after becoming discouraged by the hot summers and failed crops, Fruitland Park never developed into the town that was envisioned. After the hotel closed, the structure served as a single-family dwelling.
