= Old Hattiesburg High School =

- U.S. National Register of Historic Places
- Mississippi Landmark
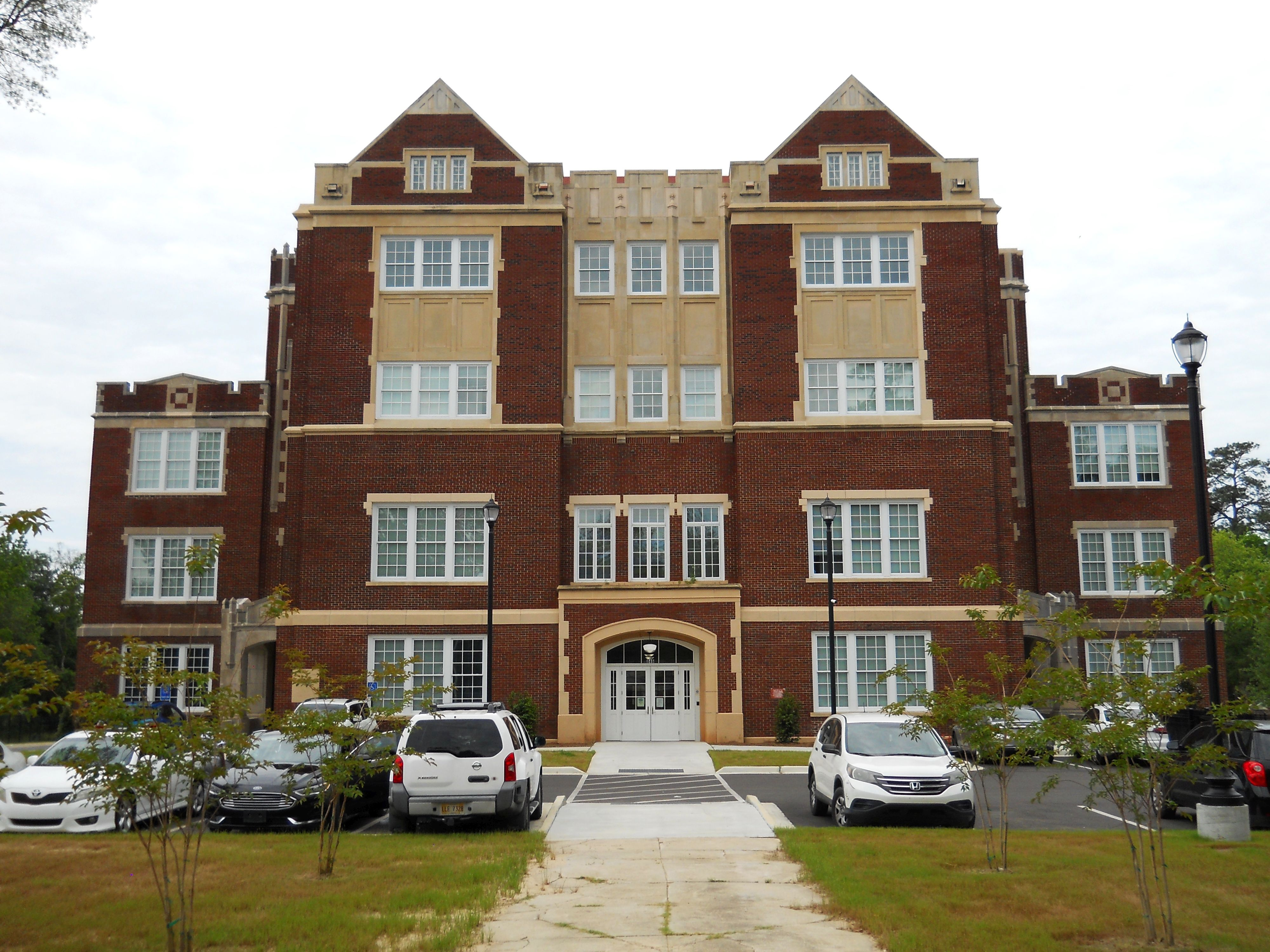
- Front facade in 2021

- Location within Mississippi Location within the United States
- Location: 846 North Main Street, Hattiesburg, Mississippi
- Coordinates: 31°19′46″N 89°17′44″W
- Built: 1911, 1921
- Architect: Robert E. Lee
- Architectural style: Jacobethan
- NRHP reference No.: 87000817
- USMS No.: 035-HAT-1689.3-NR-ML

Significant dates
- Added to NRHP: May 29, 1987
- Designated USMS: December 12, 1986

Old Hattiesburg High School, located at 846 North Main Street, in Hattiesburg, Mississippi, was utilized as a public school building from around 1911 to 1959. The building was designated a Mississippi Landmark in 1986 and was added to the National Register of Historic Places in 1987. In 2007, the structure was heavily damaged by arson. Following extensive renovations, the building was converted into an apartment complex by 2021.

== Description ==
The school building was constructed in two phases. In 1911, a 2.5-story, rear structure was built with tan brick, a flat roof, and no ornamentation. The front, 4.5-story, red brick, main building was constructed in 1921 and was designed by Hattiesburg architect Robert E. Lee. The interior featured dark-stained woodwork and pressed metal ceilings. In addition to classrooms, the building contained grand stairways and corridors, an interior courtyard, and an auditorium.

== History ==
Following closure of the building as a public school in 1959, it served as offices for the Hattiesburg Public School District and later, as an antiques mall, until 2001. The Historic Hattiesburg Downtown Association acquired the property in 2002, with the expectation of restoring the building. In 2003, the Mississippi Heritage Trust listed the Old Hattiesburg High School as one of the ten most endangered landmarks in Mississippi.

In 2005, the structure was heavily damaged during Hurricane Katrina. More severe damage occurred in 2007, when arsonists set a fire on the first floor of the 1921 addition. The fire spread to the fourth floor, and the roof collapsed. In 2008, two teens pleaded guilty to arson and were sentenced to prison. Both were released from prison in 2016.

In spite of the 2007 fire, long-term restoration plans continued, including stabilization of the front facade and fencing of the property against further vandalism. By early 2010, reconstruction of the front facade was completed, but restoration efforts ceased due to the Great Recession.

== Renovation ==
In February 2017, the Historic Hattiesburg Downtown Association sold the old Hattiesburg High School property to a developer – Steve Nail of INTERVEST Corporation. The developer announced plans to convert the High School into apartments for senior citizens, while retaining the historic Landmark and National Register characteristics of the buildings.

In February 2019, renovation work began to convert the structure into age-restricted apartments. The project reportedly received historic tax credits from the Mississippi Department of Archives and History, by virtue of retaining the historic appearance of the building. The US$15.5 million development by Harris Construction Services transformed the building into Preservation Crossing Apartments with 56 one-bedroom units and 18 two-bedroom units.

=== Renovation gallery ===
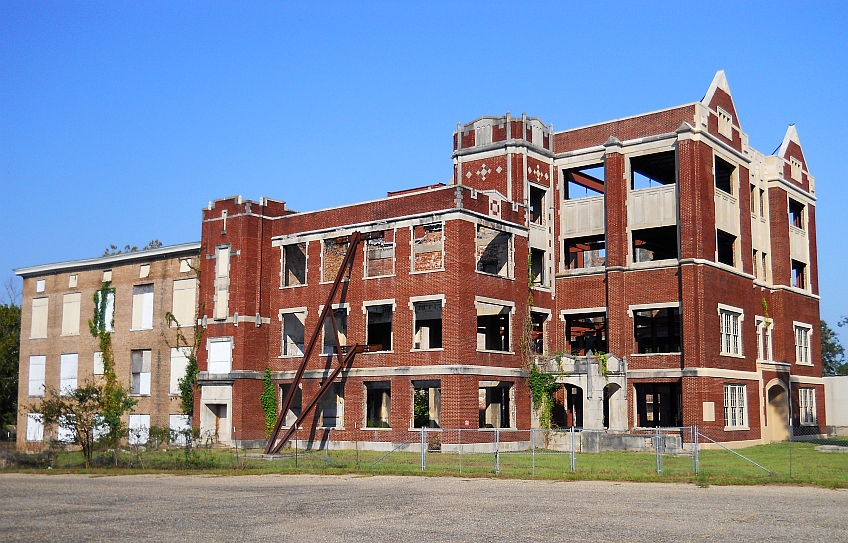
September 2012

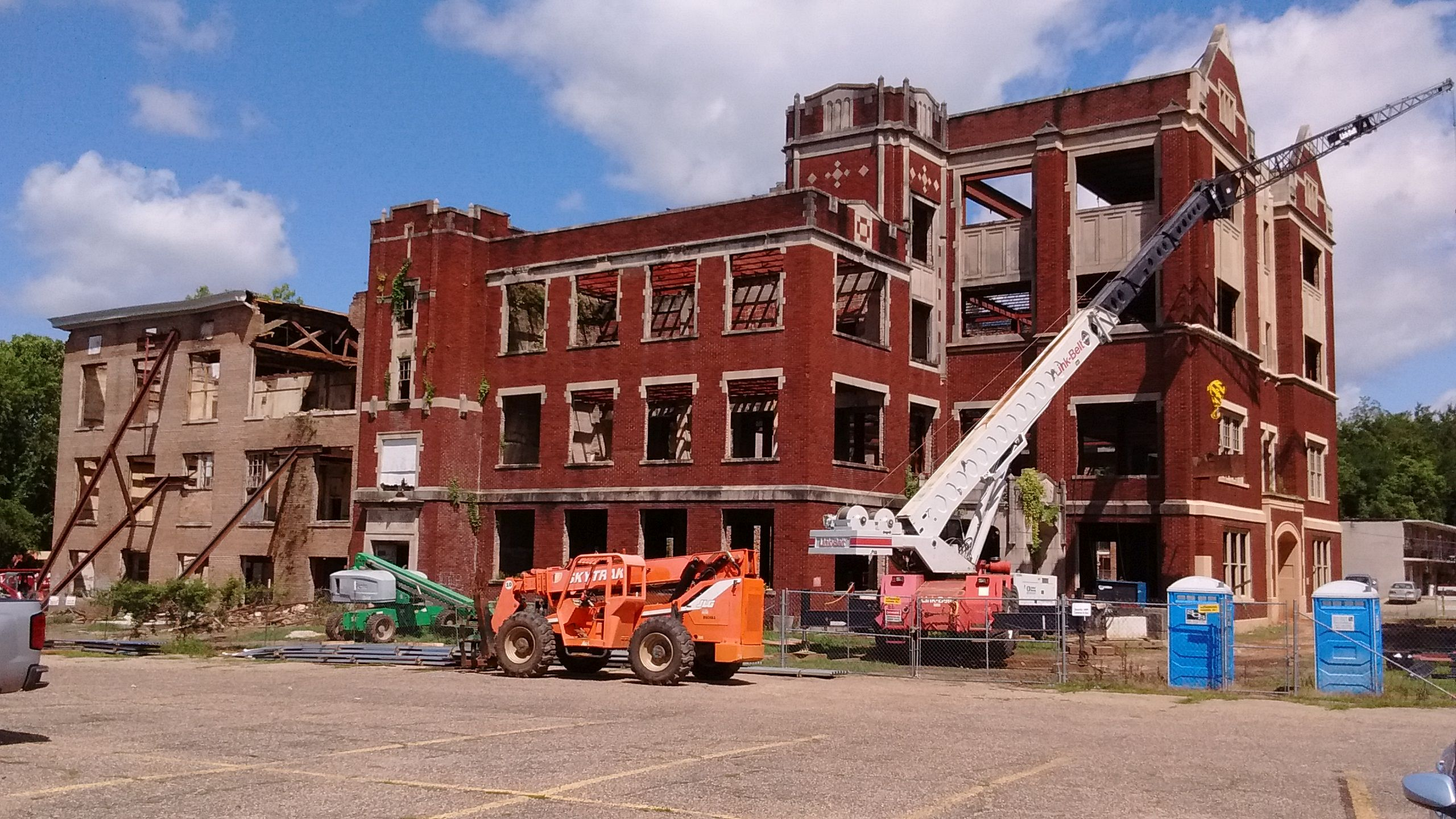
June 2019

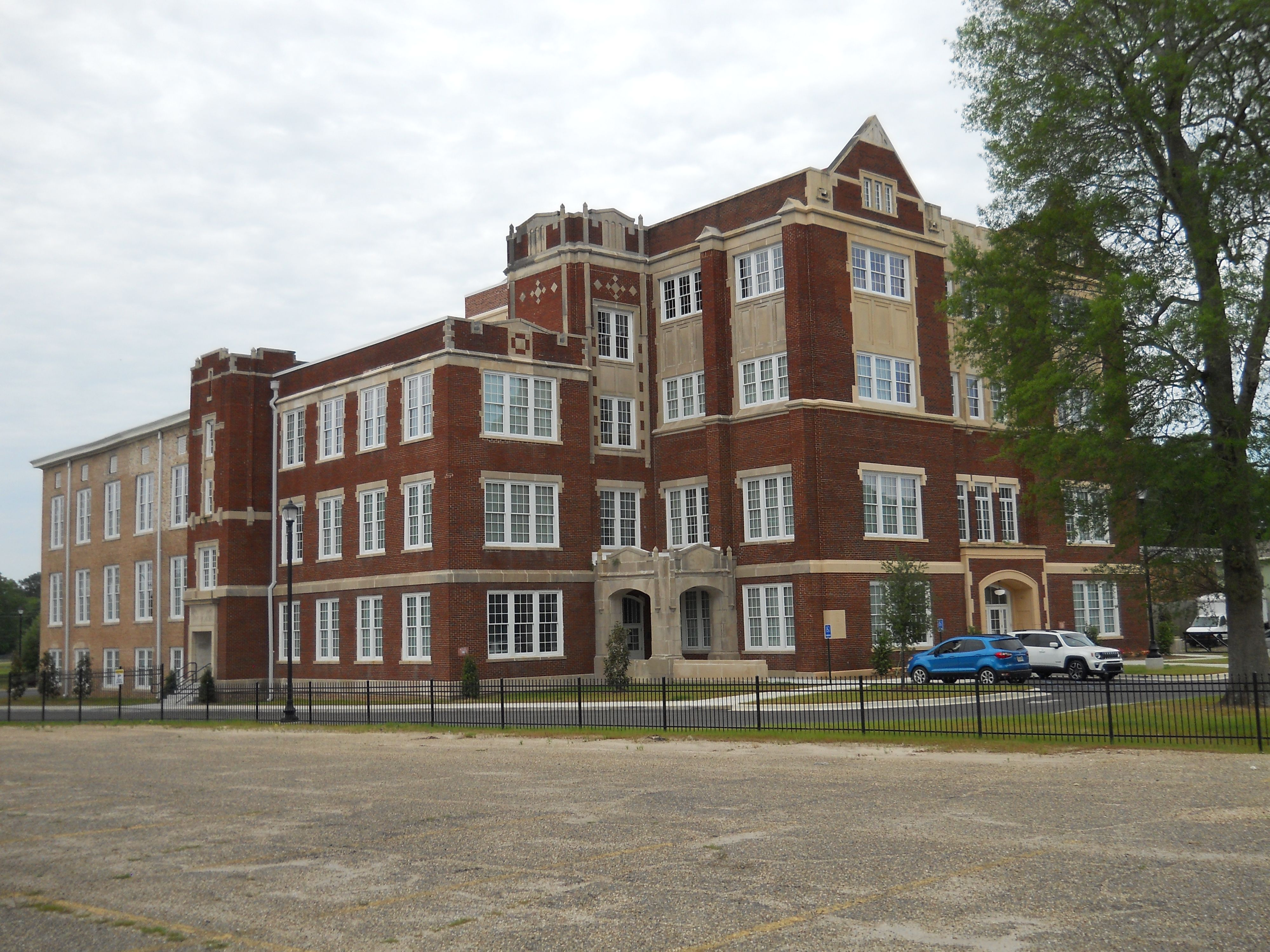
May 2021
