= List of bridges on the National Register of Historic Places in Mississippi =

This is a list of bridges and tunnels on the National Register of Historic Places in the U.S. state of Mississippi.

Name	Image	Built	Listed	Location	County	Type
Abiaca Creek Bridge		1930	2004-03-22	Vaiden; 33°19′57″N 89°56′57″W	Carroll	
Bahala Creek Bridge		1909	1988-11-16	Oma; 31°42′17″N 90°12′0″W	Lawrence	Pratt through truss
Bayou Pierre Bridge		ca. 1920	2005-06-10	Carpenter; 32°0′10″N 90°41′23″W	Copiah	
Bayou Pierre Bridge		ca. 1900, 1940	2005-06-10	Carpenter; 32°0′10″N 90°41′23″W	Copiah	
Big Black River Railroad Bridge	Big Black River Railroad Bridge	1917	1988-11-16	Bovina, Edwards; 32°20′49″N 90°42′17″W	Hinds, Warren	Open-spandrel arch
Byram Bridge		ca. 1905	1979-05-23	Bryam, Frenchs Store; 32°10′35″N 90°14′37″W	Hinds, Rankin	Twin-tower swinging sus. br.
Chunky River Bridge		1911	2004-03-22	Chunky; 32°19′16″N 88°55′54″W	Newton	
Columbus Bridge		1925–1927	1988-11-16	Columbus; 33°29′37″N 88°26′3″W	Lowndes	Warren truss;Swing truss
Confederate Avenue Brick Arch Bridge		1935	1988-11-16	Vicksburg; 32°19′44″N 90°52′31″W	Warren	Brick arch
Coon Box Fork Bridge		1919	1979-05-23	Coon Box; 31°47′25″N 91°5′37″W	Jefferson	Twin-tower Swng. Susp. Brdg.
Eddiceton Bridge		1909	1988-11-16	Eddiceton; 31°29′33″N 90°47′21″W	Franklin	Pratt truss;Camelback truss
Enterprise Bridge		ca. 1925, ca. 1935	1988-11-16	Enterprise; 32°10′33″N 88°49′11″W	Clarke	Warren polygonal pony truss
Fairchild's Creek Bridge		1930	2005-06-08	Natchez; 31°43′31″N 91°18′49″W	Adams	
Fairground Street Bridge		1895	1988-11-16	Vicksburg; 32°20′16″N 90°53′25″W	Warren	Pratt through truss
Gatesville Bridge		1908	1988-11-16	Gatesville, Pearl; 31°59′46″N 90°13′26″W	Copiah, Simpson	Pennsylvania through truss
R.H. Henry Bridge		1929	2005-06-08	Edwards; 32°20′51″N 90°41′49″W	Hinds	
Highway 11 Bridge over Chunky River		1926	1988-11-16	Enterprise; 32°11′32″N 88°49′30″W	Clarke	Parker through truss
Homochitto River Bridge		1909	1988-11-16	Hazelhurst; 31°42′48″N 90°40′1″W	Copiah	Pratt through truss
Keesler Bridge		1925	1988-11-16	Greenwood; 33°31′18″N 90°11′3″W	Leflore	Swing through truss
Lamb-Fish Bridge		1905	1982-05-17	Charleston; 34°1′20″N 90°11′32″W	Tallahatchie	Vertical Lift Span
Leaf River Bridge		1907	1988-11-16	McClain; 31°7′39″N 88°49′1″W	Greene	Pennsylvania through truss
Lucien Bridge		1938	2005-06-16	McCall Creek; 31°30′40″N 90°39′59″W	Franklin	
Mahned Bridge		1903	1997-11-24	New Augusta; 31°13′28″N 89°5′6″W	Perry	Pratt Through Truss
Mississippi River Bridge		1928–1930	1989-02-14	Vicksburg; 32°18′54″N 90°54′20″W	Warren	Cantilevered truss span
Motley Slough Bridge	Motley Slough Bridge	1920	1988-11-16	Columbus; 33°26′21″N 88°31′8″W	Lowndes	Pratt pony truss
Old Hill Place Bridge		ca. 1920	1979-05-23	Fayette; 31°40′9″N 91°10′52″W	Jefferson	Twin-tower swng. susp. brdg.
Owens Creek Bridge		1917	1988-11-16	Utica; 32°5′29″N 90°43′45″W	Claiborne	Warren pony truss
Pearl River Bridge on Mississippi Highway 28		1940	2005-06-10	Georgetown; 31°52′31″N 90°8′17″W	Copiah	
Running Water Creek Bridge		1928	1988-11-16	Shuqualak; 33°1′5″N 88°36′50″W	Noxubee	Pratt half-hip pony truss
Shubuta Bridge		1919	1988-11-16	Shubuta; 31°51′25″N 88°41′12″W	Clarke	Camelback through truss
Stuckey's Bridge		1901	1988-11-16	Meridian; 32°15′20″N 88°51′19″W	Lauderdale	Stearns through truss
Tibbee Bridge	Tibbee Road Bridge	1896	1988-11-16	West Point; 33°32′17″N 88°38′0″W	Clay	Pratt through truss
Valley of the Moon Bridge		ca. 1925, ca. 1930	2005-06-08	Port Gibson; 32°1′3″N 90°52′37″W	Claiborne	
Waverly Bridge		1914	1989-03-20	Columbus, Waverly; 33°33′54″N 88°29′48″W	Clay, Lowndes	Swinging through truss
Widow's Creek Bridge		1917	1988-11-16	Port Gibson; 31°56′30″N 91°3′3″W	Claiborne	Pratt half-hip pony truss
Woodrow Wilson Bridge		1925	1988-11-16	Jackson; 32°17′22″N 90°10′44″W	Hinds, Rankin	Open-spandrel concrete arch
Woodburn Bridge	Woodburn Bridge	ca. 1916	1988-11-16	Indianola; 33°23′15″N 90°42′21″W	Sunflower	Pratt truss;Swing truss
Yellow Creek Bridge		1910	1988-11-16	Waynesboro; 31°41′49″N 88°40′13″W	Wayne	Pratt pony truss
Youngblood Bridge		1900, 1915	1979-05-23	Union Church; 31°38′0″N 90°48′51″W	Jefferson	Twin-tower swng. susp. brdg.
Confederate Avenue Steel Arch Bridge	Steel Arch Bridge	1903	removed 2002-12-16	Vicksburg	Warren	Steel deck arch
Hickahala Creek Bridge		1926	removed 1996-03-15	Senatobia	Tate	Warren pony truss
Rockport Bridge		1910	removed 1999-12-15	Georgetown, Pinola	Copiah, Simpson	Pennsylvania through truss
Waynesboro Bridge		1910	removed 2004-04-07	Waynesboro	Wayne	Pratt through truss
