= National Register of Historic Places listings in Newton County, Mississippi =

Location of Newton County in Mississippi

This is a list of the National Register of Historic Places listings in Newton County, Mississippi.

This is intended to be a complete list of the properties and districts on the National Register of Historic Places in Newton County, Mississippi, United States. Latitude and longitude coordinates are provided for many National Register properties and districts; these locations may be seen together in a map.

There are 7 properties and districts listed on the National Register in the county.

This National Park Service list is complete through NPS recent listings posted March 14, 2025.

== Current listings ==
| | Name on the Register | Image | Date listed | Location | City or town | Description |
|---|---|---|---|---|---|---|
| 1 | Alabama and Vicksburg Railroad Depot | Alabama and Vicksburg Railroad Depot | July 12, 1990 (#90001076) | S. Main St. 32°19′13″N 89°09′45″W | Newton | |
| 2 | Boler's Inn | Boler's Inn | August 2, 1999 (#99000838) | 8165 MS-492; 32°34′22″N 89°07′17″W | Union | |
| 3 | Chunky River Bridge | Chunky River Bridge | March 22, 2004 (#04000217) | Adams St. 32°19′16″N 88°55′54″W | Chunky | |
| 4 | Lavelle Site | | June 9, 1978 (#78001625) | Address restricted | Enterprise | |
| 5 | McElroy-Hoye House | McElroy-Hoye House | May 14, 2019 (#100003952) | 400 E. Church St. 32°19′16″N 89°09′33″W | Newton | |
| 6 | Newton County American Legion Post No. 89 Hut | Newton County American Legion Post No. 89 Hut | March 13, 2007 (#07000148) | 14051 MS-15; 32°25′12″N 89°06′37″W | Decatur | Constructed in 1934 |
| 7 | Newton West Church Historic District | Newton West Church Historic District | January 20, 1980 (#80002295) | W. Church St. 32°19′22″N 89°10′09″W | Newton | |

== See also ==
- List of National Historic Landmarks in Mississippi
- National Register of Historic Places listings in Mississippi
