= Volcan, Mississippi =

- Ghost town
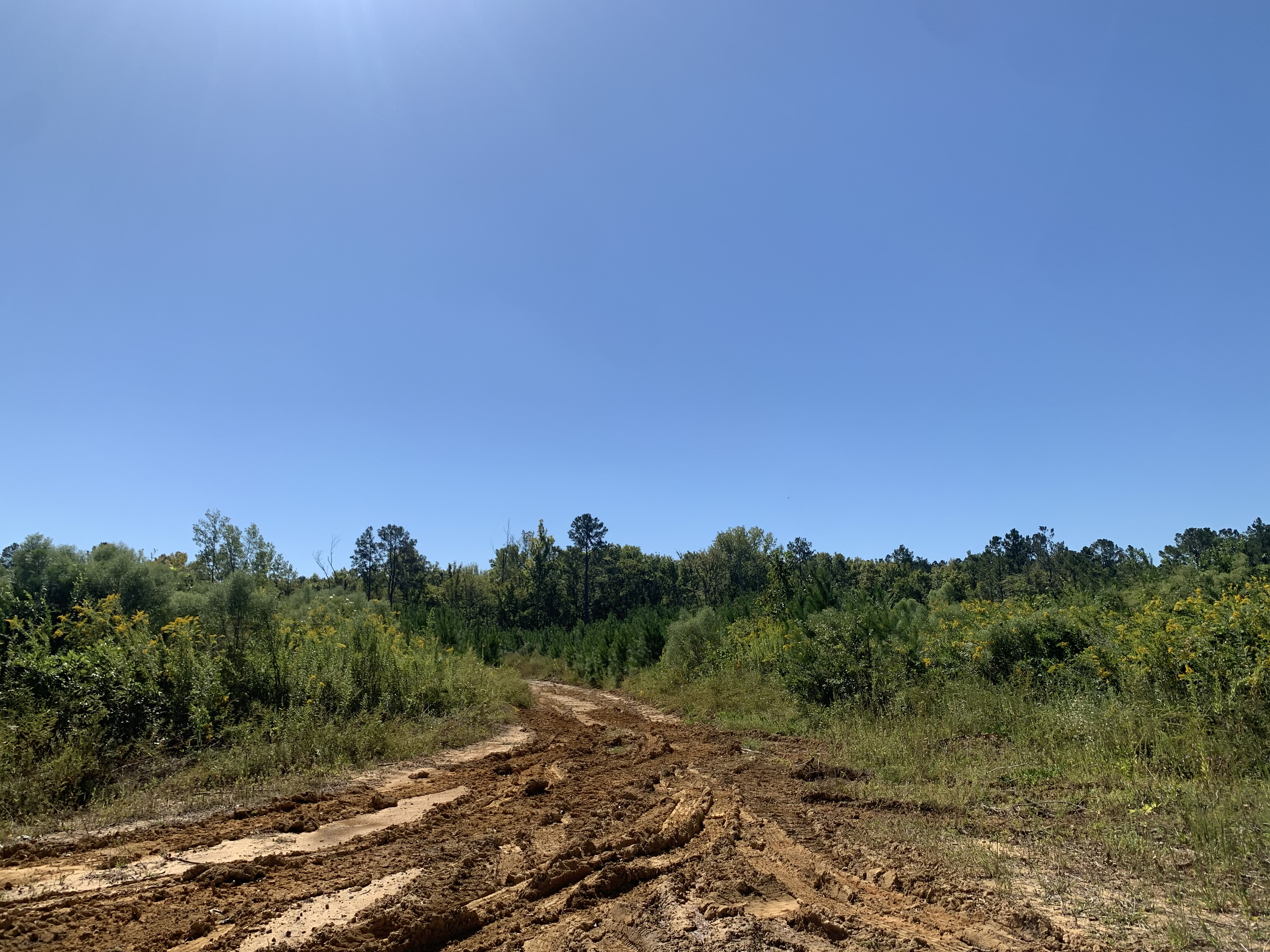
- Road to the ghost town Volcan.

- Location within Mississippi Location within the United States
- Coordinates: 32°15′44″N 89°11′44″W
- Country: United States
- State: Mississippi
- County: Newton
- Elevation: 417 ft (127 m)
- Time zone: UTC-6 (Central (CST))
  - Summer (DST): UTC-5 (CDT)
- GNIS feature ID: 705489

Volcan is a ghost town in Newton County, Mississippi, United States.

Located five miles southwest of Newton, Mississippi, Volcan was first established as a flag stop on the Gulf, Mobile and Northern Railroad in October 1913. It had a six car stub track. The community dissolved sometime after 1916.
