= Cedar Grove, Mississippi =

- Unincorporated community
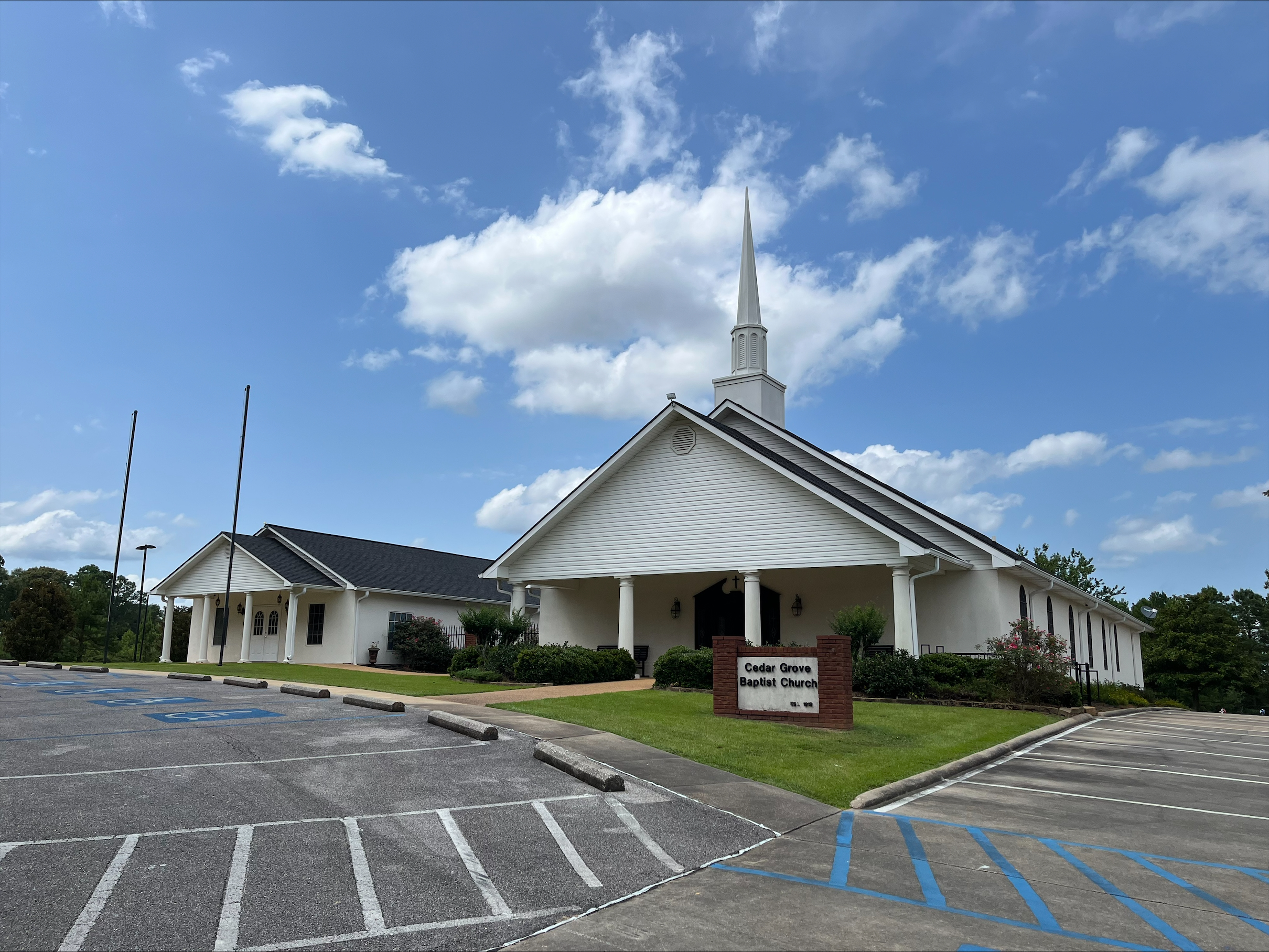
- Cedar Grove Baptist Church

- Location within Mississippi Location within the United States
- Coordinates: 32°20′57″N 89°11′09″W
- Country: United States
- State: Mississippi
- County: Newton
- Elevation: 466 ft (142 m)
- Time zone: UTC-6 (Central (CST))
  - Summer (DST): UTC-5 (CDT)
- Area codes: 601 & 769
- GNIS feature ID: 705455

Cedar Grove is an unincorporated community in Newton County, Mississippi, United States.

The community is located along an east-west trending ridge between Dunnagin Creek to the north and Richardson Mill Creek to the south. Newton lies approximately two miles to the southeast.
