= Arthur B. Clark =

American politician

Member of the Mississippi House of Representatives from the Sunflower County district
- In office January 1916 – January 1924
- Succeeded by: Horace Stansel

Personal details
- Born: August 3, 1888 Newton, Mississippi
- Died: March 3, 1968 (aged 79) Indianola, Mississippi
- Party: Democrat

Arthur Barnett Clark (August 3, 1888 - March 3, 1968) was a Democratic member of the Mississippi House of Representatives, representing Sunflower County, from 1916 to 1924.

== Biography ==
Arthur Barnett Clark was born on August 3, 1888, in Newton, Mississippi. He was the son of Civil War Confederate veteran William Andrew Clark and Mary Elizabeth (Nichols) Clark. Arthur was educated in the public schools of Newton County and graduated from the Newton high school. He then attended the University of Mississippi, graduating with a A. B. in 1912. He then received a LL. B. cum laude from the university in 1914. He was admitted to the bar in 1914 and in June, he began practicing law in Indianola. He was first elected to the Mississippi House of Representatives, representing Sunflower County as a Democrat, in 1915 for the 1916–1920 term. He fought in the United States Army during World War I as a commissioned officer until being discharged as a major in December 1918. He was re-elected to the House in 1919 for the 1920–1924 term. During this time period, he was also partners in a law firm with former Mississippi Legislator Samuel D. Neill. He died of a heart attack on March 3, 1968, in a car wash in Indianola. He had last resided in Indianola.
