= Cane Ridge, Mississippi =

Archaic placename, Jefferson County

Cane Ridge is an archaic placename of Jefferson County, Mississippi, United States. According to a local historian, Cane Ridge was one of five main geographic regions of antebellum Jefferson County and was considered

"the central district, and was bounded on the north by Claiborne county. Here settled Willis McDonald, my grandfather, a soldier of the Revolution, who served under Marion; Ledbetter, Watkins, Divine, Watson, Davis, Brent, Heckler, Goodrum, Bollen, Farley, Hynum, Shaw, Bolls, Gibson, Harrison and many others, whose names come spontaneously into my mind as I write."

A log schoolhouse and a church were established at Cane Ridge about 1818. According to the WPA history of Jefferson County,

"At a later date the school was moved to a point near Clifton crossroads about a mile northwest of Lorman where it was established under the title of CHALMERS SCHOOL. Early pupils of the Cane Ridge School were probably Farleys, McDonalds, Watkins, Jones, etc..."

The WPA interviewed one old resident who stated,

"I first attended school at Clifton Cross-roads, about one-half mile north of Lorman. Later I went to Cane Ridge School which was out at the Old Cane Ridge Church, southwest of Lorman. It was a beautiful spot shaded with forest trees, oaks and hickories."

Services were held in the Cane Ridge Methodist Church, which stood "northwest of the town of Lorman" until 1846. A new church was established "where Cane Ridge Cemetery is now located" but this burned or was burned down during the American Civil War. The church was rebuilt in 1867 from materials salvaged from another disused church. The church moved again in 1916. The area was apparently served by two blacksmiths before the civil war:

"Plows, axes, wagons, and a variety of other articles used on plantations called for the blacksmith, who appeared in the person of Richard Surry, at a place now known as 'Clifton,' on the old Robinson Road, and Ben Miller, at Raccoon Box."
