= Lorman, Mississippi =

- Unincorporated community
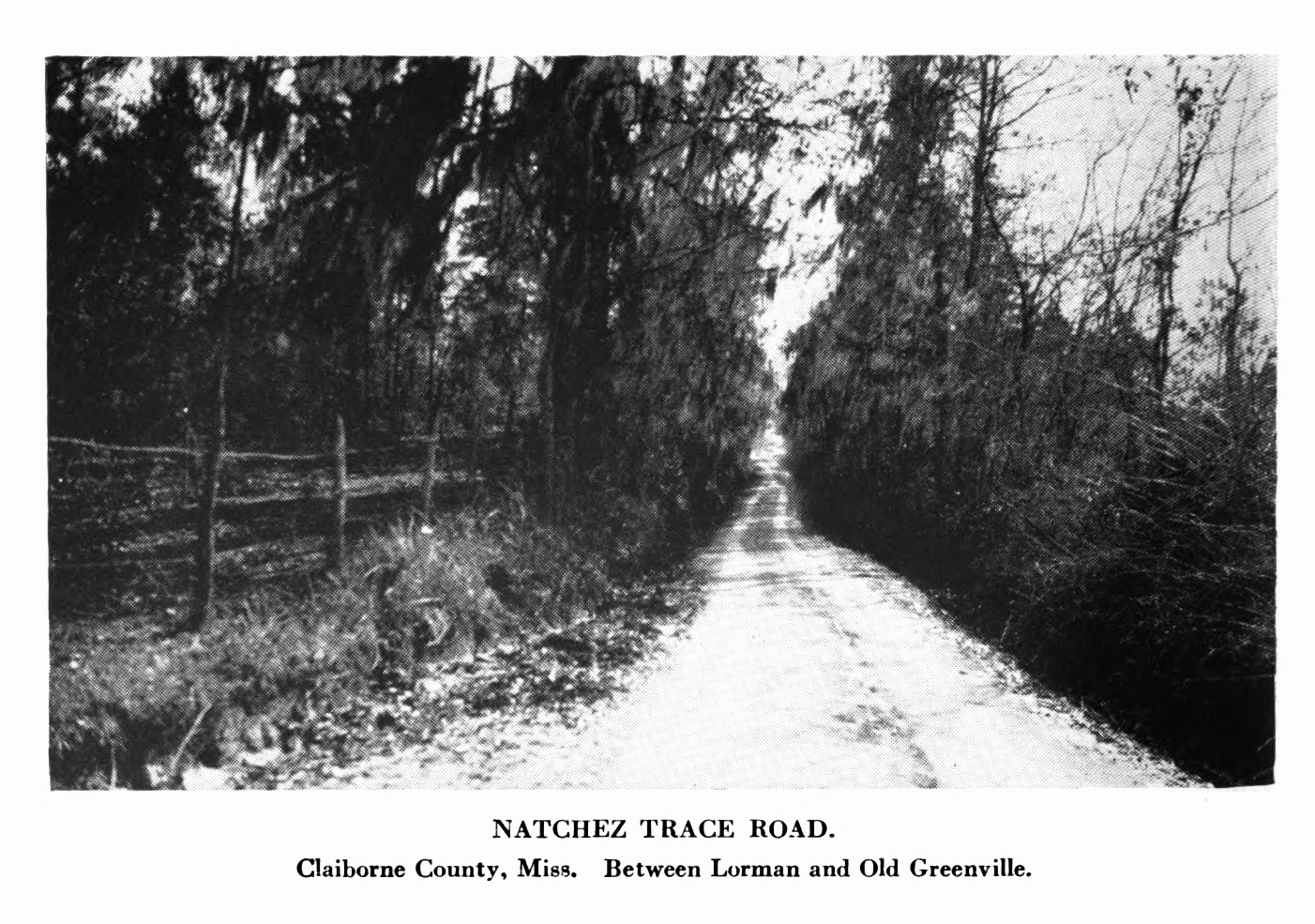
- Natchez Trace Road near Lorman and Old Greenville, photographed c. 1938

- Location within Mississippi Location within the United States
- Coordinates: 31°49′14″N 91°03′00″W
- Country: United States
- State: Mississippi
- County: Jefferson
- Elevation: 217 ft (66 m)
- Time zone: UTC-6 (Central (CST))
  - Summer (DST): UTC-5 (CDT)
- ZIP code: 39096
- Area code: 601
- GNIS feature ID: 672868

Lorman is an unincorporated community located in Jefferson County, Mississippi, United States. Lorman is approximately 8 miles (13 km) north of Fayette, near Highway 61 on Mississippi Highway 552.

Lorman is the nearest community to Alcorn State University, in Claiborne County, the alma mater of former NFL quarterback Steve McNair. Its ZIP code is 39096.

== History ==
Lorman is located on the former Illinois Central Railroad. A post office operated under the name Lee from 1884 to 1899 and first began operating under the name Lorman in 1899.

Lorman is home to multiple historic plantations, including Blantonia Plantation, Canemount Plantation, China Grove, Prospect Hill Plantation, and Rosswood.

== Education ==
Jefferson County School District operates public schools in all of the county.

The county is in the district of Copiah–Lincoln Community College, and has been since 1967.

== Notable people ==
- Steve McNair, NFL player
- Bill Foster, member of the Baseball Hall of Fame and former head baseball coach of Alcorn State University.

== See also ==
- Cane Ridge, Mississippi
