= Stratton, Mississippi =

- Unincorporated community
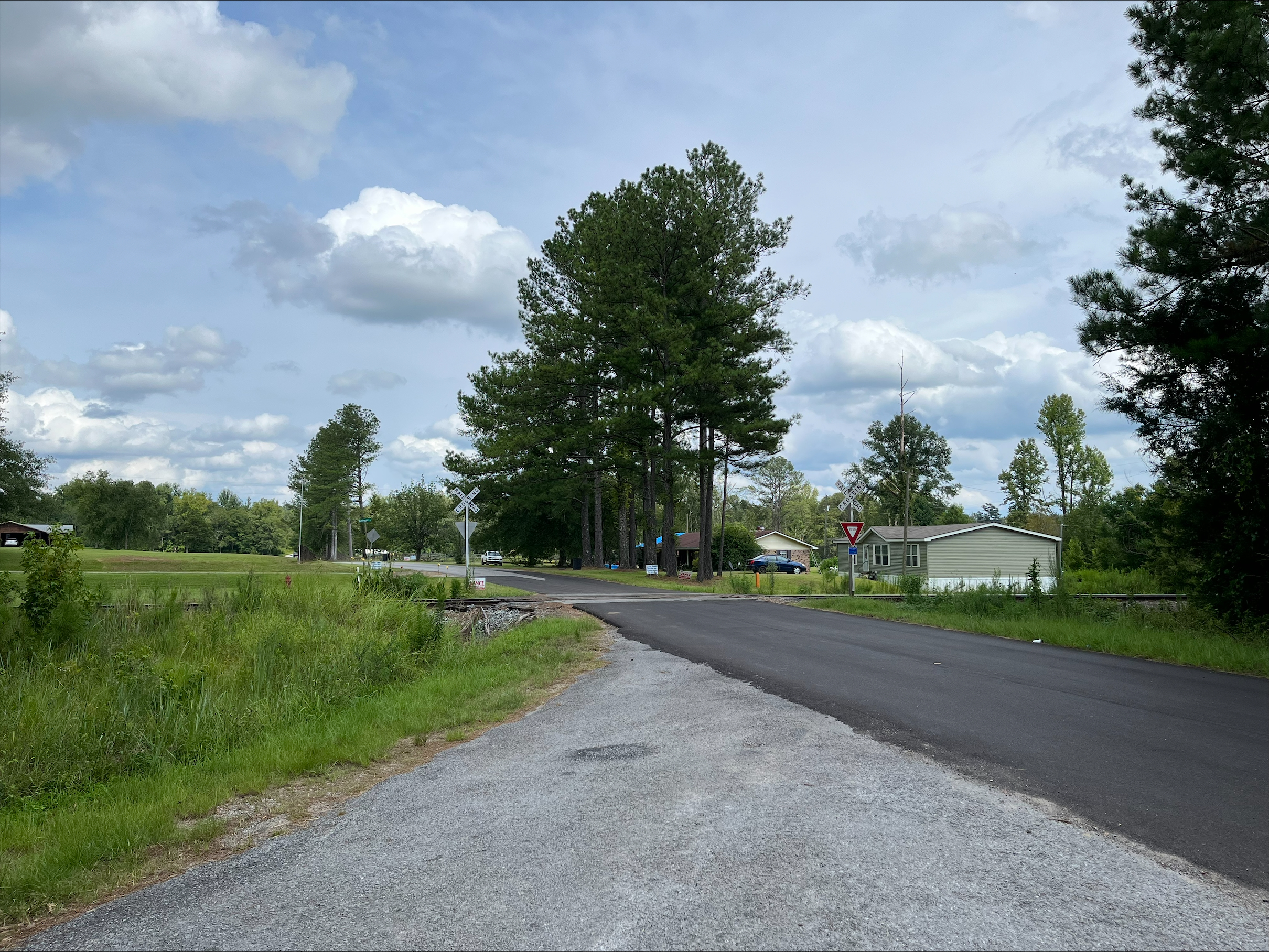
- Kansas City Southern Railway crossing in Stratton

- Location within Mississippi Location within the United States
- Coordinates: 32°29′59″N 89°08′03″W
- Country: United States
- State: Mississippi
- County: Newton
- Elevation: 446 ft (136 m)
- Time zone: UTC-6 (Central (CST))
  - Summer (DST): UTC-5 (CDT)
- Area code: 601
- GNIS feature ID: 678343

Stratton is an unincorporated community located in Newton County, Mississippi, United States.

== History ==
Stratton was located on the Gulf, Mobile and Ohio Railroad (GM&O). Stratton was founded in 1905 and was formed after the village of Stamper moved to be closer to the railroad. At one point, Stratton was home to a sawmill, four general stores, and a grocery store. The GM&O also formerly operated a siding in Stratton. Stratton was also the former site of a school.

A post office operated under the name Stratton from 1906 to 1956.
