= Horace Stansel =

American politician (1888–1936)

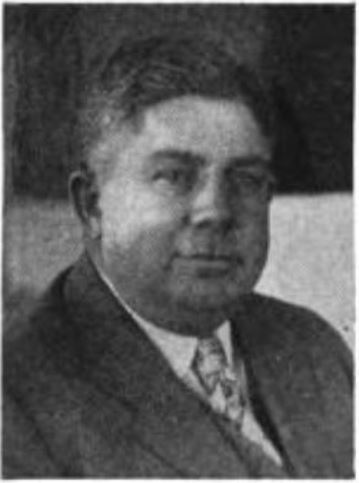
- c. 1924

53rd Speaker of the Mississippi House of Representatives
- In office January 7, 1936 – April 4, 1936
- Preceded by: Thomas L. Bailey
- Succeeded by: Fielding Wright

Member of the Mississippi House of Representatives from Sunflower County
- In office January 1924 – April 4, 1936
- Preceded by: Arthur B. Clark
- Succeeded by: Pearl Stansel

Personal details
- Born: Horace Sylvan Stansel; November 5, 1888 Ruleville, Mississippi, U.S.
- Died: April 4, 1936 (aged 47) Jackson, Mississippi, U.S.
- Party: Democratic
- Spouse: Dovie Pearl High
- Education: Mississippi A&M College

Horace Sylvan Stansel (November 5, 1888 – April 4, 1936) was an American civil engineer and politician, remembered chiefly as the original architect of Mississippi's highway system. He served in the Mississippi House of Representatives including as Speaker. He was succeeded in office by his wife Dovie Stansel after his death.

== Biography ==
Horace Stansel was born in 1888 in Ruleville, Sunflower County, in the Mississippi Delta. He attended Franklin Academy in Columbus as a child. While working as a laborer to help construct Mississippi A&M (now Mississippi State University), he supposedly overheard from a co-worker that labor could be used to earn a man's way through college. According to his later statements, he immediately presented himself to the office of the university president for admission. Stansel earned a degree in civil engineering after studying from 1911 to 1915.

Stansel was first elected to the Mississippi House of Representatives in 1923. In 1928, Stansel was appointed by then-Governor Theodore G. Bilbo as the head of a committee to investigate the state's highway needs. The committee's conclusions resulted in Stansel authoring the Stansel Act of 1930, which established Mississippi's system of paved highways. Stansel placed his own touch on the system: the intersection of the state highways in Ruleville is at the site of his family home.

Stansel's success in Jackson led him to run, and win, election in the Mississippi House of Representatives. He progressed rapidly in prestige during the Great Depression and was elected Speaker of the House in 1936, shortly before his death from a heart attack. His widow, Pearl Stansel, took his seat and was later elected in her own right, serving from 1936 to 1944.

Horace Stansel Memorial Library in Ruleville was named in his honor in 1938.
