= Perdue, Mississippi =

- Unincorporated community
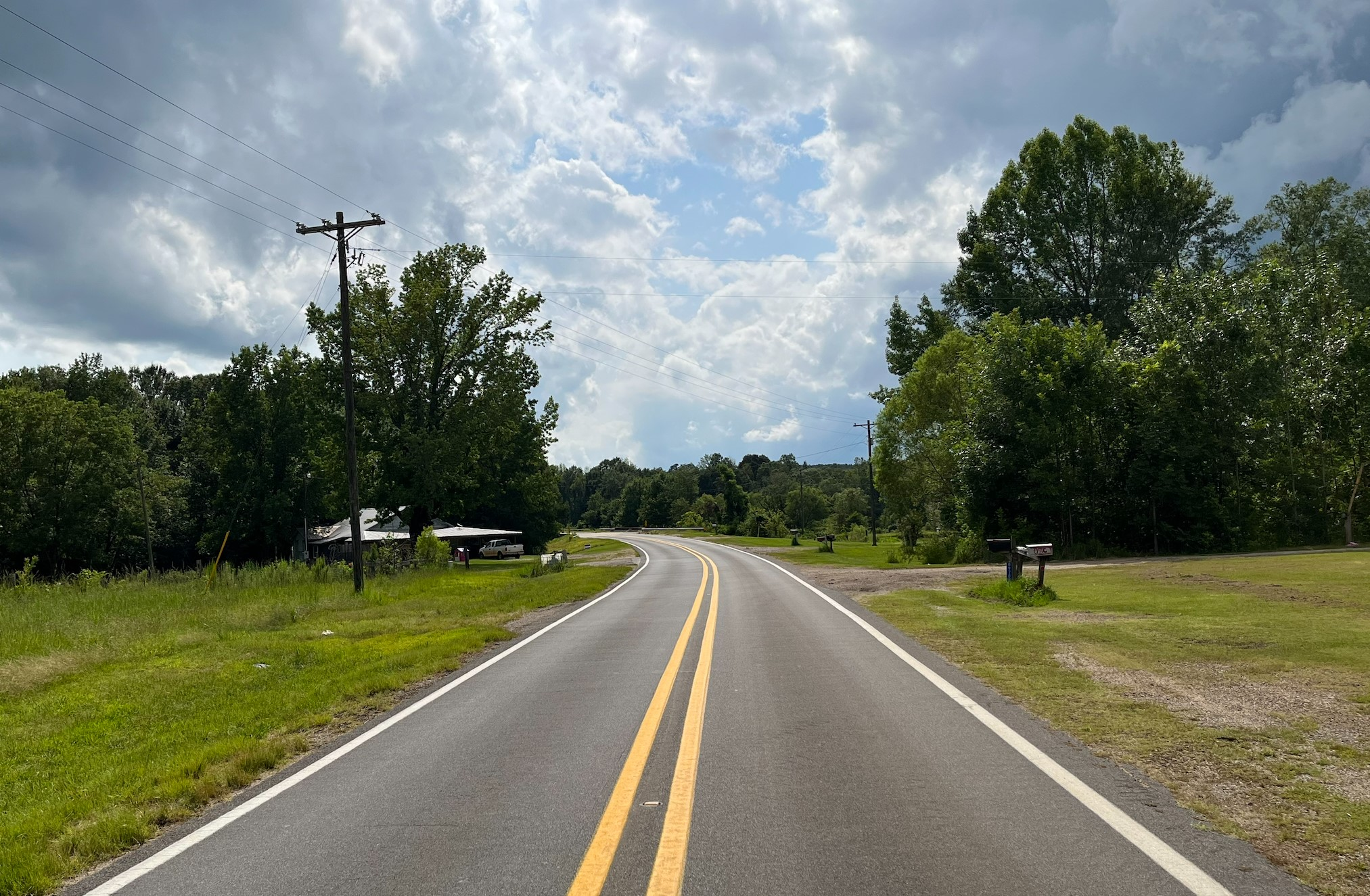
- Mississippi Highway 494 in Perdue

- Location within Mississippi Location within the United States
- Coordinates: 32°30′53″N 88°58′56″W
- Country: United States
- State: Mississippi
- County: Newton
- Elevation: 397 ft (121 m)
- Time zone: UTC-6 (Central (CST))
  - Summer (DST): UTC-5 (CDT)
- Area code: 601
- GNIS feature ID: 692139

Perdue is an unincorporated community located in Newton County, Mississippi, United States. Its ZIP Code is 39337.

== History ==
Perdue was first established in 1905 as the junction of the Gulf, Mobile and Northern Railroad and Buckwalter Lumber Company logging road based out of Union, Mississippi. There was a commissary there, maintained by the railroad, which served the lumbermen that resided there. Dummy lines were built north extending into Neshoba County, where logging was done by contractors. The town had a large depot and several camp cars where railroad employees lived. At one point, it had nearly 100 residents. When all of the timber was gone, logging was abandoned and the town lost most of its industry.
