= Duffee, Mississippi =

- Unincorporated community
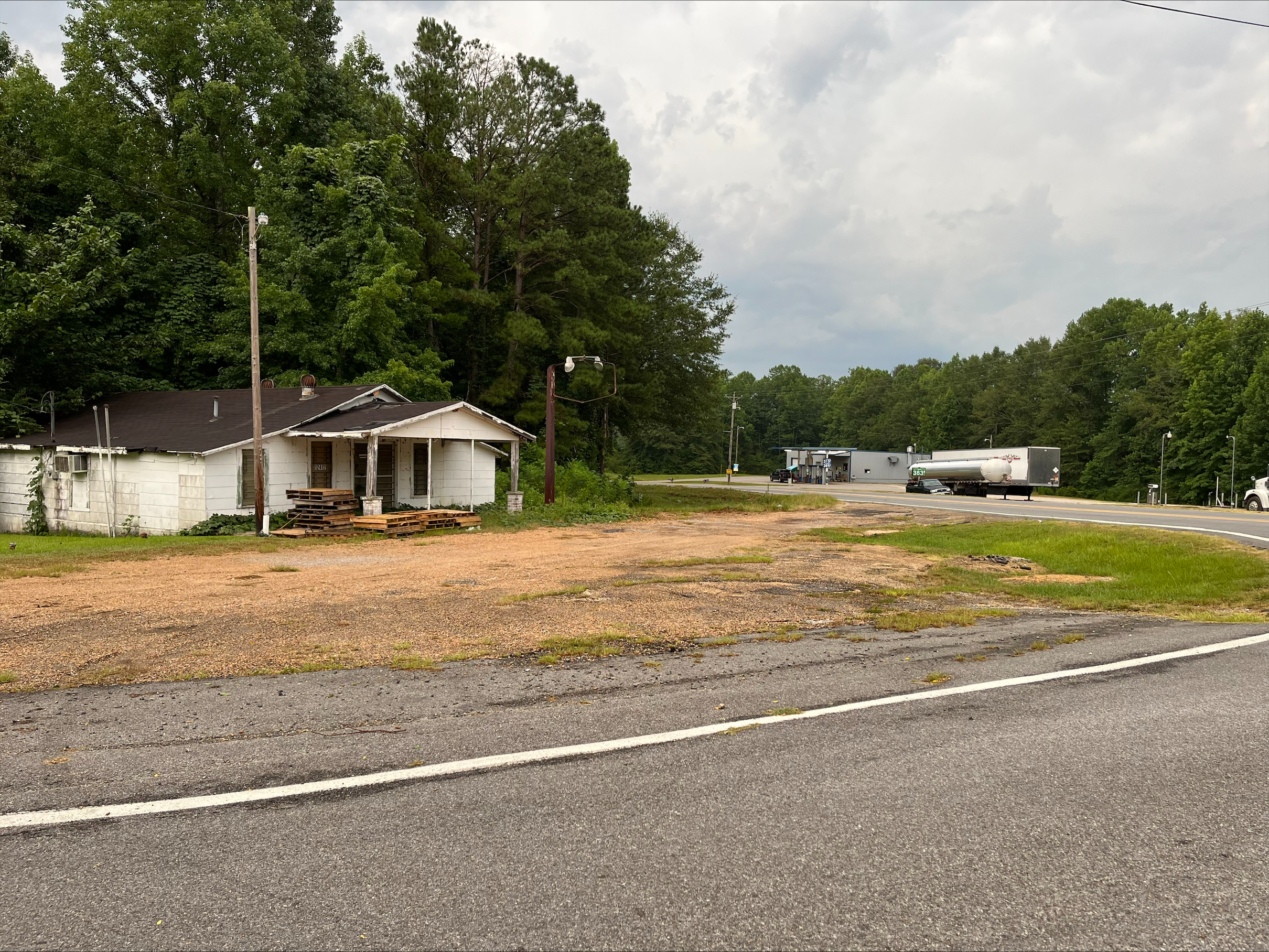
- Crossroads in Duffee

- Location within Mississippi Location within the United States
- Coordinates: 32°29′22″N 88°55′37″W
- Country: United States
- State: Mississippi
- County: Newton
- Elevation: 499 ft (152 m)
- Time zone: UTC-6 (Central (CST))
  - Summer (DST): UTC-5 (CDT)
- ZIP code: 39337
- Area code: 601
- GNIS feature ID: 669484

Duffee is an unincorporated community located in Newton County, Mississippi, United States. Duffee is approximately 6.3 miles (10.1 km) east-southeast of Little Rock south of Mississippi Highway 494.

== History ==
Duffee, first known as Liberty and later as Rue, was established as a religious community of Baptists from the Liberty Church shortly after the American Civil War. It was a quiet community in its first thirty years, gaining some commerce when the Buckwalter Lumber Company of Union, Mississippi established a railroad through the village and, in 1906, was renamed from Rue to Duffee for a railroad surveyor. In 1915, a depot was constructed on the Gulf, Mobile and Northern Railroad which opened the following year. By 1916, the place had two churches, a school, and a mill. In 1918, it had a recorded population of 85. After the Great Depression, most of the inhabitants fled to find work elsewhere and the community suffered greatly in part. The community then saw a small resurgence in 1937 with the founding of the Columbus Planing Mill.

The first post office established here was called Rue, which ran from 1902 to 1906. Another post office operated under the name Duffee from 1914 to 1959 and later, under the name Duffee Rural Station from 1959 to 1969.
