= Battlefield, Mississippi =

- Unincorporated community
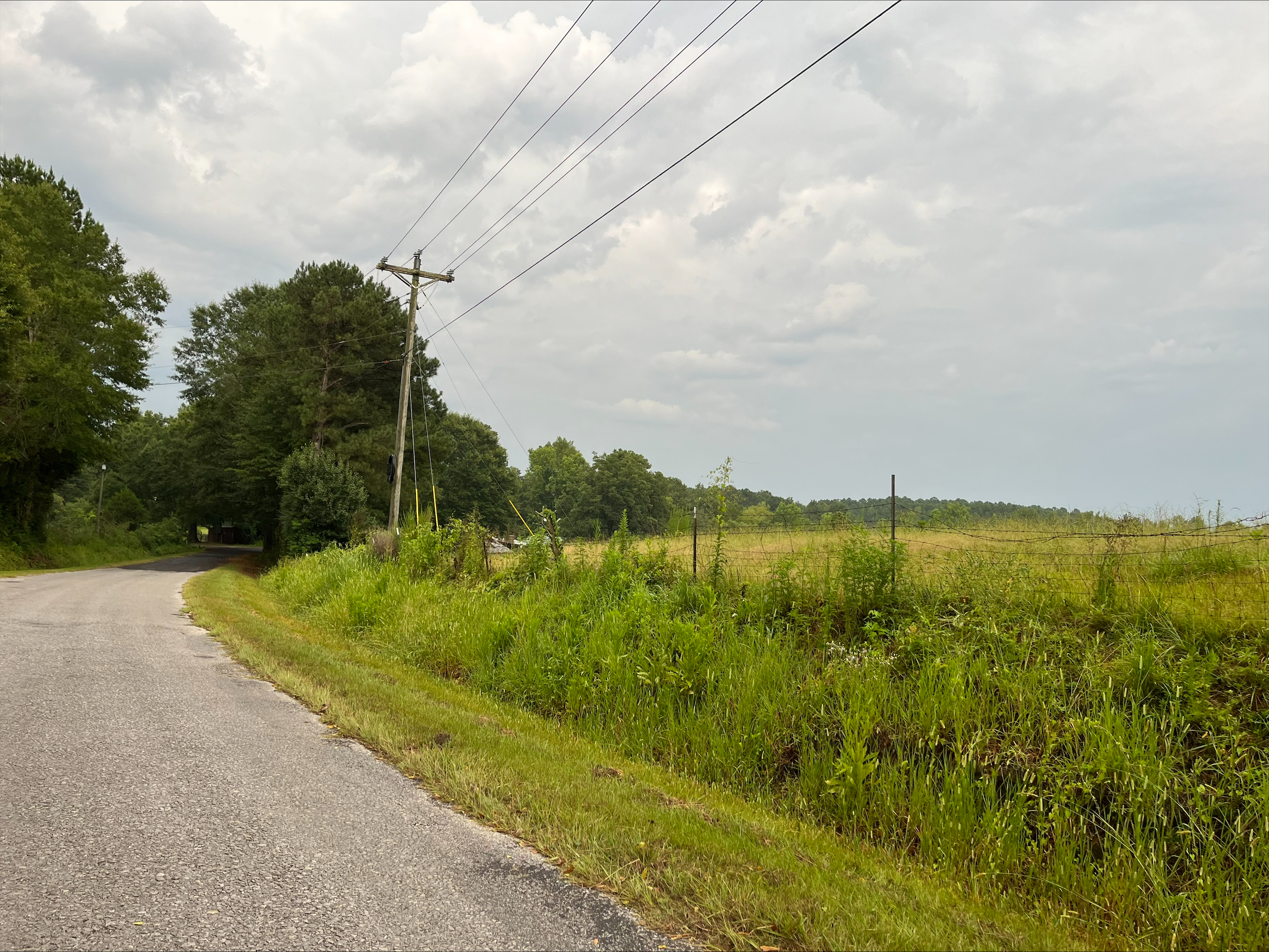
- A bend in a road that runs through Battlefield

- Location within Mississippi Location within the United States
- Coordinates: 32°32′48″N 88°56′24″W
- Country: United States
- State: Mississippi
- County: Newton
- Elevation: 476 ft (145 m)
- Time zone: UTC-6 (Central (CST))
  - Summer (DST): UTC-5 (CDT)
- Area code: 601
- GNIS feature ID: 689443

Battlefield is an unincorporated community located in Newton County, Mississippi United States. Its zip code is 39325.

== History ==
Battlefield, first located in adjacent Lauderdale County, Mississippi, was allegedly established on and named for a Choctaw battlefield. Its first post office opened in 1849 before it was moved Newton County, Mississippi in March 1860. The community served as the northern terminus of the Tallahatta Railroad and at one point had a number of businesses and churches, along with a school. The post office stayed open until 1915. The community has a cemetery, though all of its tombstones disappeared overnight in the 1970s.

The community was more recently home to a dragstrip called the Battlefield Raceway that has since been shut down.
