= James Evans (Mississippi politician) =

American politician (born 1950)

Member of the Mississippi House of Representatives from the 70th district
- In office 1992–2016
- Preceded by: Kathy Sykes

Personal details
- Born: October 13, 1950 (age 75) Newton, Mississippi, U.S.
- Party: Democratic
- Profession: Minister

James Evans (born October 13, 1950) is an American politician. He was a member of the Mississippi House of Representatives from the 70th District, being first elected in 1991 and serving until 2016. He is a member of the Democratic Party.
