= Shankstown, Mississippi =

Extinct settlement in Jefferson County

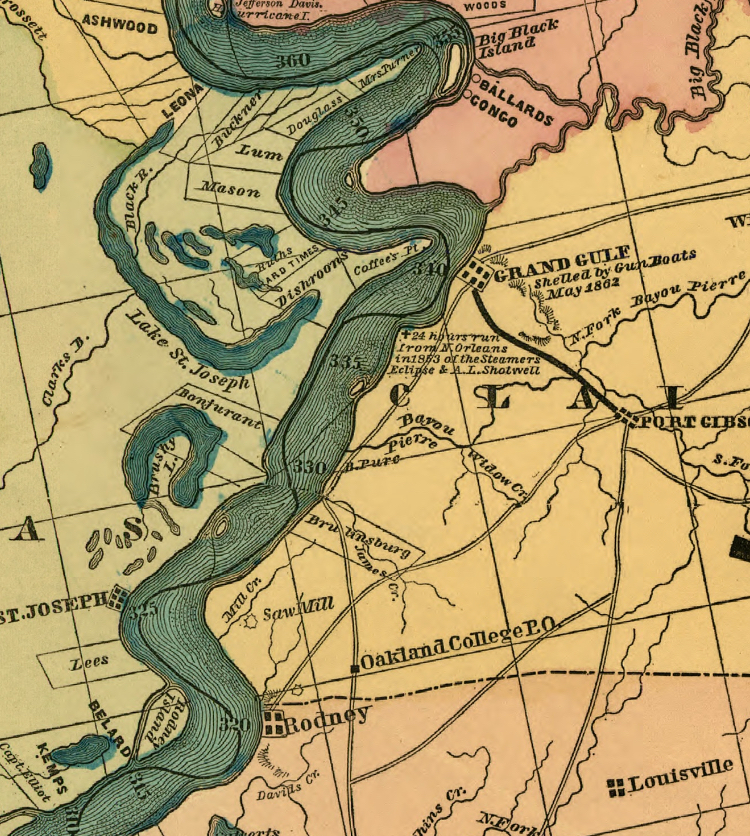
1862 map showing Shankstown as Louisville

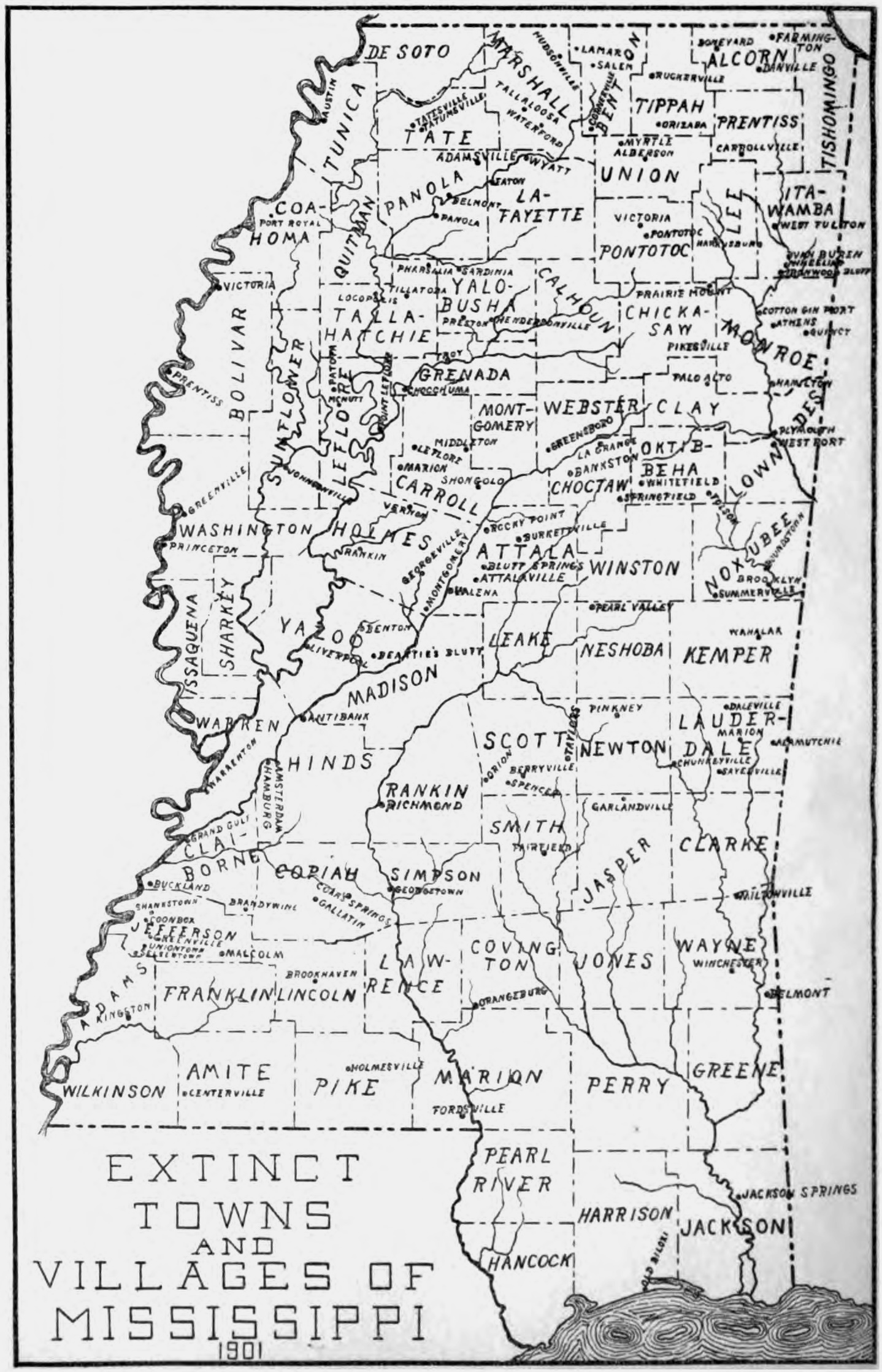
Extinct Towns and Villages of Mississippi 1901

Shankstown, Mississippi is an extinct settlement that was located two miles northeast of Coonbox and six miles north of Old Greenville in Jefferson County, Mississippi. Shankstown stood along the Natchez Trace. Shankstown was established by tavern keeper John H. Shanks around 1810, and that town was originally incorporated as Louisville, Mississippi in 1825, but was still commonly called Shankstown. The settlement had a U.S. post office and a number of businesses in the first half of the 19th century. There was a stagecoach route between Port Gibson and Natchez that stopped at Shankstown three times a week.

According to the Mississippi Historical Society in 1901, Shankstown was "named for a gentleman, Mr. Shanks, who had a hotel at this place at an early date. This town was not laid off into blocks, though it contained a large number of houses, a store or two, a cabinetmaker's shop, a blacksmith's shop, etc. The place is now owned and occupied by colored people." A few "sheds" still stood at the site of Shankstown into the 1950s. In 1963, there were plans for a nature trail past the site of Shankstown.

All that remains of Shankstown today is a cemetery, believed to have about 20 graves, but only one has a grave marker.

The name survives in Shankstown Creek.
