= Big Black River Railroad Bridge =

Bridge in Mississippi

- U.S. National Register of Historic Places
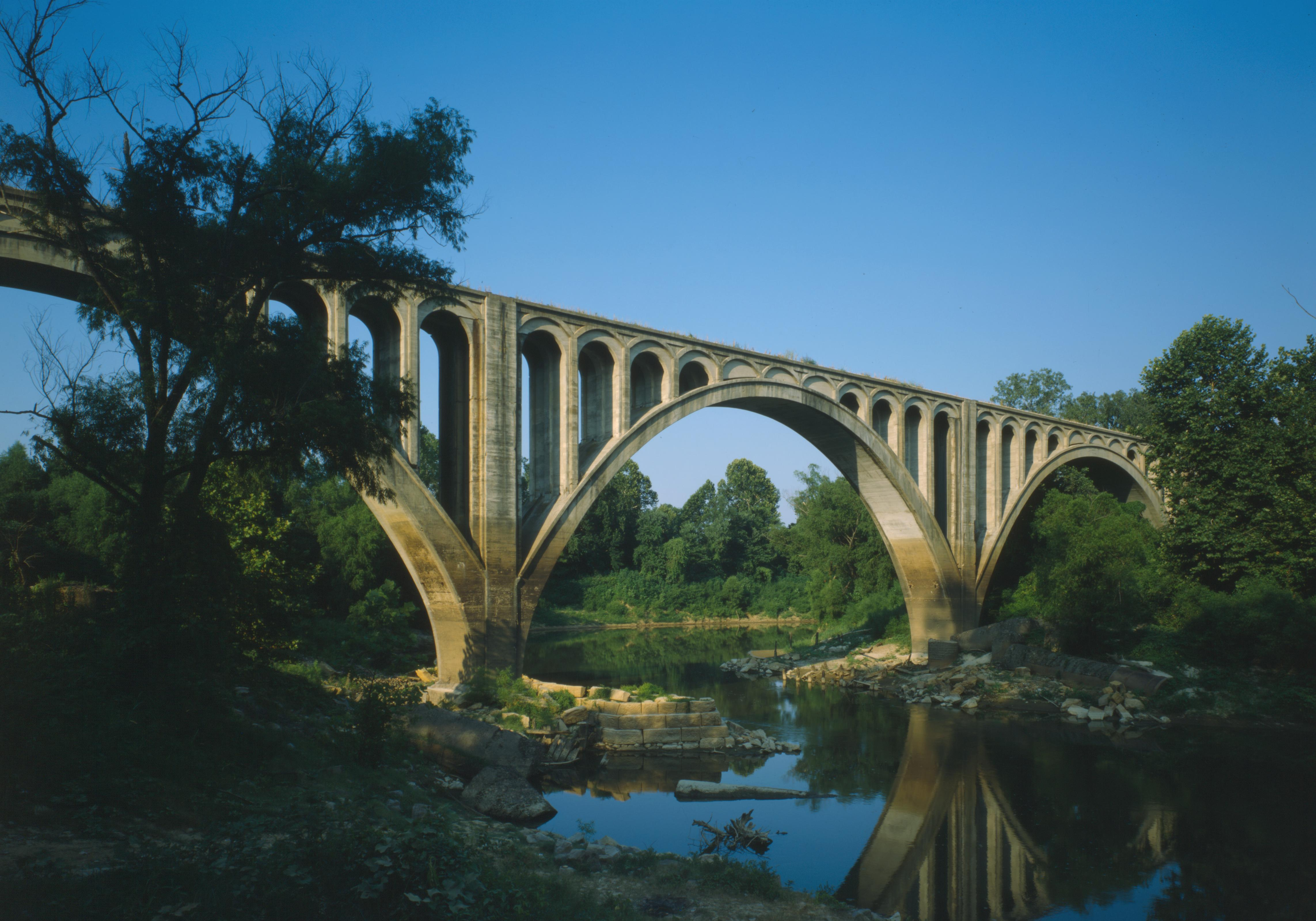
- Downstream side of the bridge

- Location within Mississippi Location within the United States
- Nearest city: Bovina and Edwards, Mississippi
- Coordinates: 32°20′49″N 90°42′17″W
- Built: 1917
- Architectural style: Open-spandrel arch
- MPS: Historic Bridges of Mississippi TR
- NRHP reference No.: 88002418
- Added to NRHP: November 16, 1988

Big Black River Railroad Bridge is a 465-foot-long (142 m) concrete open-spandrel arch bridge over the Big Black River built in 1917 near Bovina, Mississippi. It spans the river between Warren County and Hinds County; the nearest settlements are Bovina (in Warren) and Edwards, Mississippi (in Hinds).

It was listed on the National Register of Historic Places in 1988. According to its listing in the Mississippi Historic Bridge Survey in 1988, it is significant as the largest and "most impressive" concrete open-spandrel bridge in Mississippi (out of just two in the state).

Open-spandrel concrete arch bridges were built in the early 1900s in areas where concrete was not too expensive relative to alternatives and where the span would be sufficiently high so that the arch could span the requisite distance. (Truss bridges can be built lower.)

== See also ==
- Big Black River Battlefield
