= Chunky River Bridge =

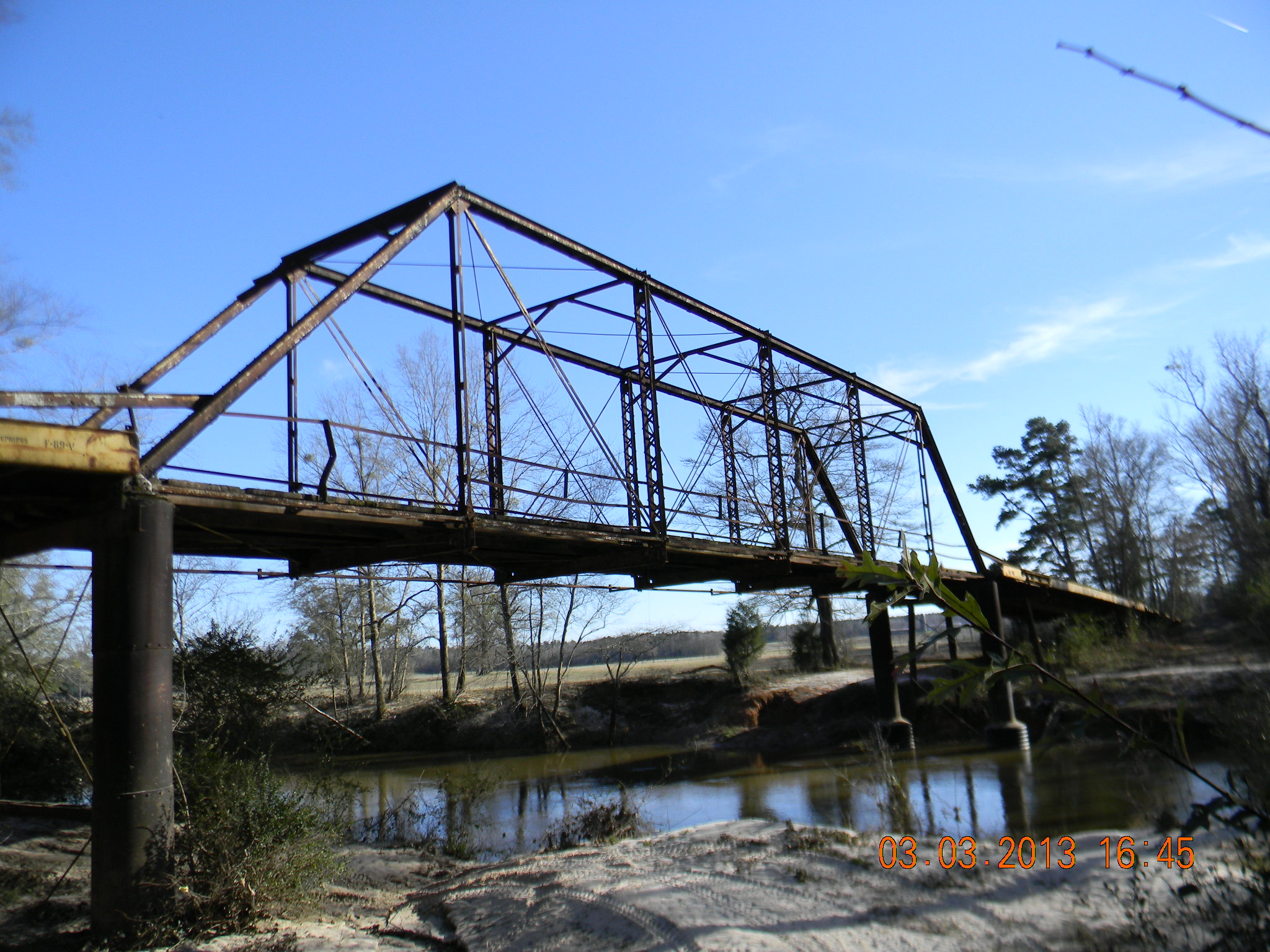
- Coordinates: 32.32126°N 88.93179°W
- Carries: Single-lane vehicular traffic
- Crosses: Chunky River
- Locale: Chunky, Mississippi
- Official name: Chunky River Bridge
- Heritage status: Listed on the National Register of Historic Places

Characteristics
- Design: Pratt through truss bridge
- Material: Steel
- Total length: 100.6 ft (30.7 m)
- Width: 14 ft (4.3 m)

History
- Constructed by: Nashville Bridge Company
- Construction end: 1911
- Opened: 1911

The Chunky River Bridge is a historic bridge located in Chunky, Newton County, Mississippi.

== History ==
Built in 1911 by the Nashville Bridge Company of Nashville, Tennessee, the Chunky River Bridge is a one-lane, single-span Pratt through truss bridge. The bridge is 100.6 feet (30.7 m) in length and 14 feet (4.3 m) in width, with a deck surfaced in wooden planking. It is approached at both the north and south ends by elevated roadways with wooden plank decking and low wooden railings.

The bridge was constructed to facilitate vehicular traffic across the Chunky River, serving as an important transportation link in the rural area. It was added to the National Register of Historic Places on March 22, 2004, as part of the "Historic Bridges of Mississippi" multiple property submission.

== Design and construction ==
The Chunky River Bridge features a Pratt through truss design, a popular type of bridge construction used in the United States during the late 19th and early 20th centuries. The bridge's structural elements include steel trusses, wooden planking for the deck, and concrete-filled metal caissons supporting the metal truss span.

== Significance ==
The bridge is significant for its engineering and is one of the most intact surviving examples of a one-lane Pratt through truss vehicular bridge in Mississippi. Bridges of this type were commonly built on rural roads throughout Mississippi from around 1900 through the 1930s, but surviving examples are now rare.

A comprehensive survey of all known truss bridges in the state of Mississippi pre-dating 1953 revealed that many such bridges have been demolished or abandoned, making the continued survival of the Chunky River Bridge notable.

== Preservation ==
The Chunky River Bridge is maintained by the Newton County Board of Supervisors and remains in fairly good condition despite some rust and lack of regular maintenance. It retains its historical integrity and has not been altered since its construction.
