= Newton station (Mississippi) =

- Alabama and Vicksburg Railroad Depot
- U.S. National Register of Historic Places
- Mississippi Landmark
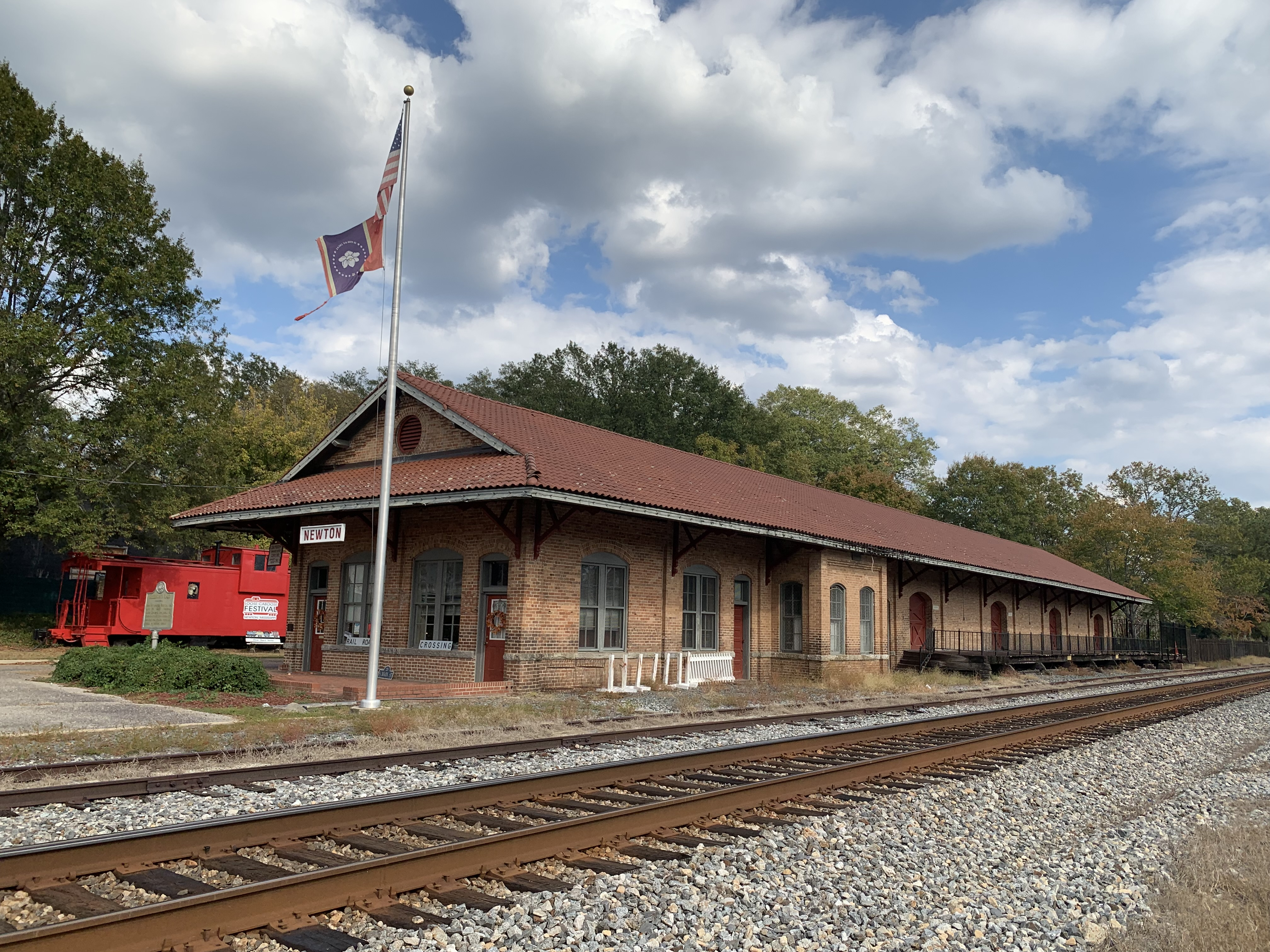
- The historic Alabama and Vicksburg Railroad Depot in Newton, Mississippi

- Location within Mississippi Location within the United States
- Location: S. Main St., Newton, Mississippi
- Coordinates: 32°19′13″N 89°9′45″W
- Area: 1 acre (0.40 ha)
- Architectural style: Vernacular railroad
- NRHP reference No.: 90001076
- USMS No.: 101-NEW-0032-NR-ML

Significant dates
- Added to NRHP: July 12, 1990
- Designated USMS: April 4, 1990

Newton station in the USA is a historic railroad depot in Newton, Mississippi.

It was located on the A & V (Alabama and Vicksburg) Railroad. It was built in 1904 (122 years ago), and later operated by the Illinois Central. It was added to the National Register of Historic Places in 1990 as the Alabama and Vicksburg Railroad Depot. It is now used by the Newton Chamber of Commerce.

During the American Civil War, on April 24, 1863, Federal troops under General Benjamin Grierson struck the Vicksburg-Meridian rail route, tore up tracks and burned the Newton depot.

== See also ==
- National Register of Historic Places listings in Mississippi
- List of Mississippi Landmarks

Preceding station	Illinois Central Railroad	Following station
Lawrence toward Shreveport	Vicksburg Route Division	Hickory toward Meridian
