= Coon Box, Mississippi =

Extinct settlement, Jefferson County

- Unincorporated community
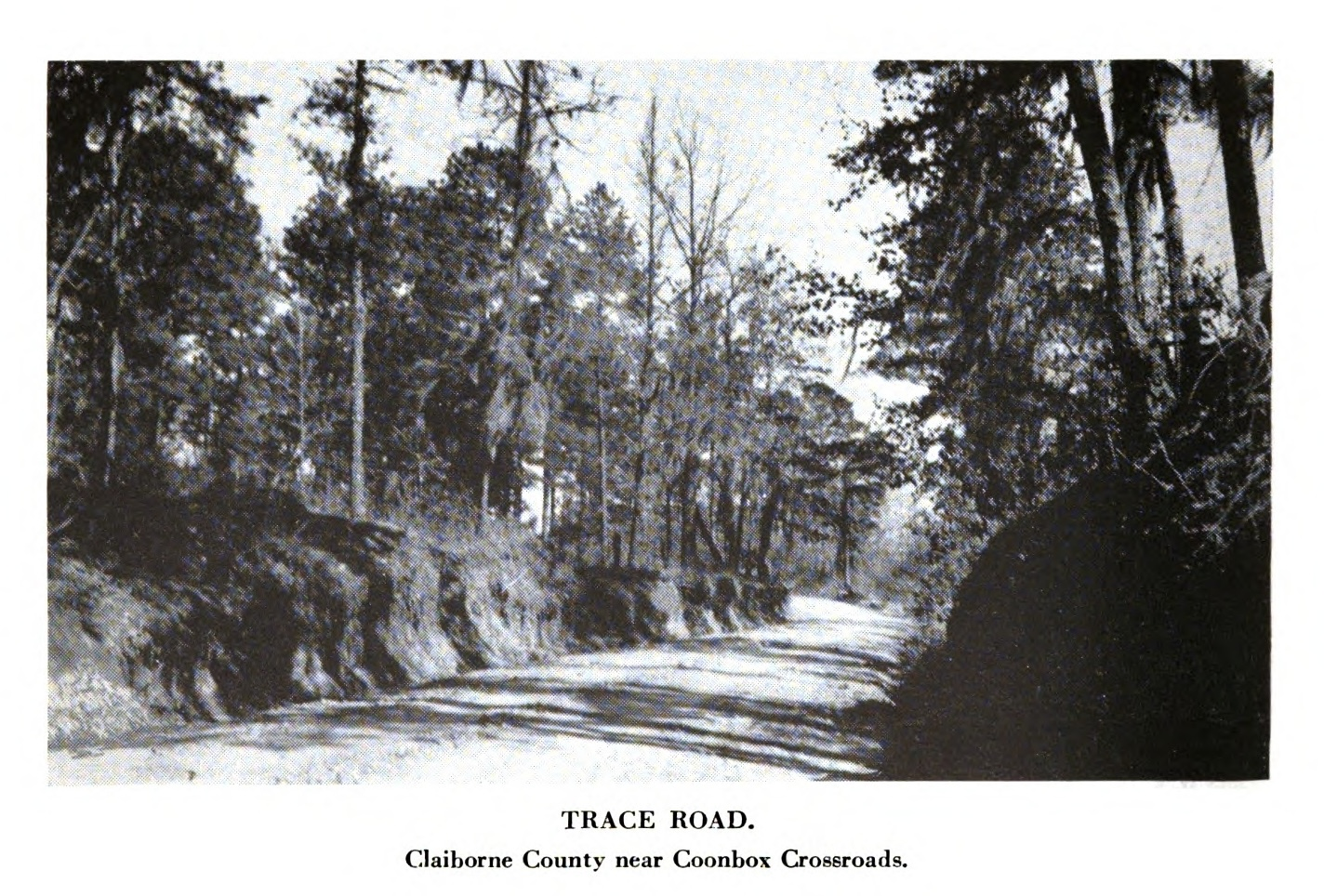
- Trace Road near Coonbox Crossroads Claiborne County Mississippi circa 1938

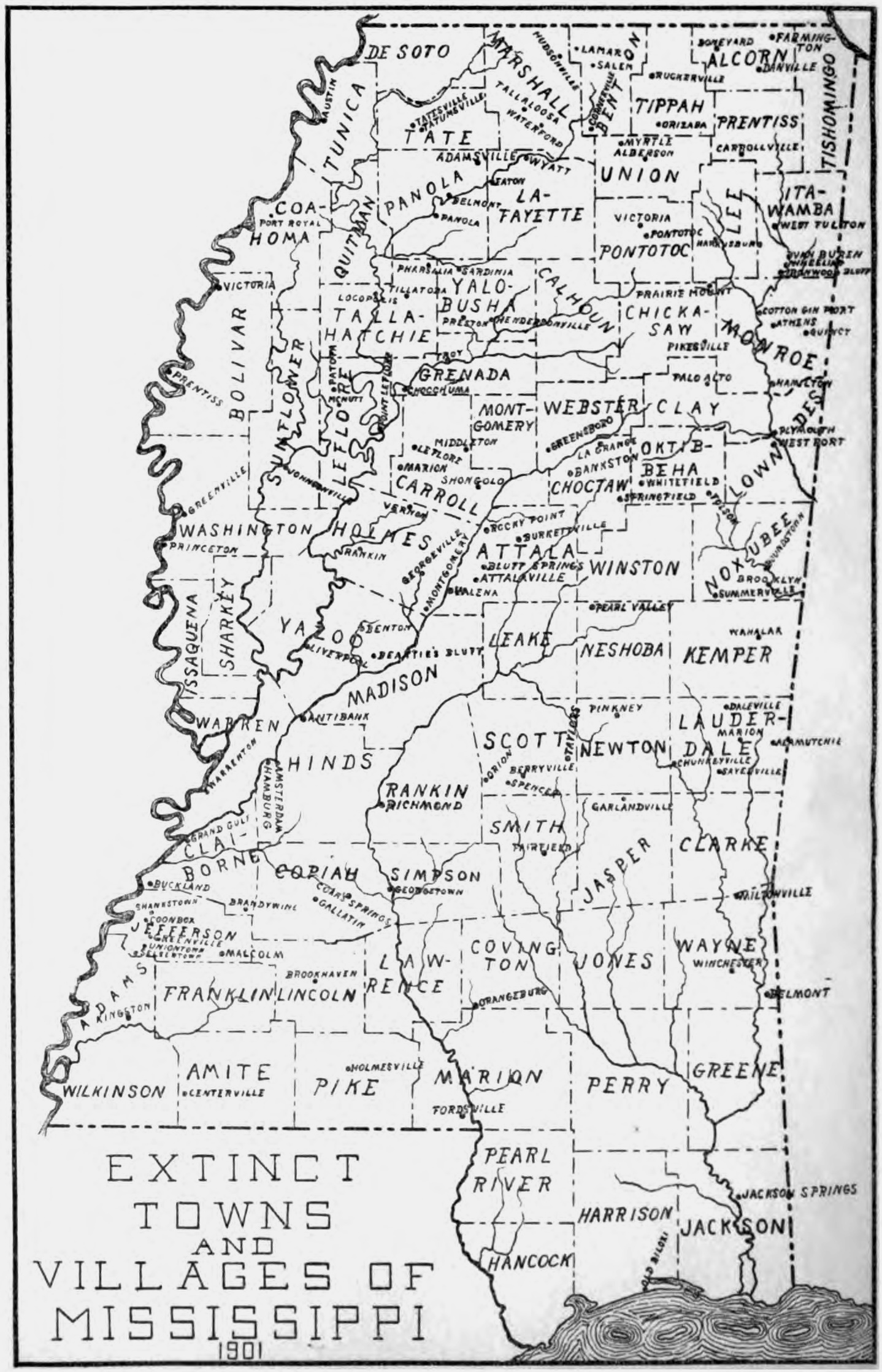
- Extinct Towns and Villages of Mississippi 1901

- Location within Mississippi Location within the United States
- Coordinates: 31°47′45″N 91°04′42″W
- Country: United States
- State: Mississippi
- County: Jefferson
- Elevation: 161 ft (49 m)
- Time zone: UTC-6 (Central (CST))
  - Summer (DST): UTC-5 (CDT)
- Area codes: 601 & 769
- GNIS feature ID: 668795

Coon Box, also Coonbox and Raccoon Box, is a placename in Jefferson County, Mississippi, United States. Coon Box is 5.9 miles (9.5 km) north of Fayette. The Coon Box Fork Bridge, which is listed on the National Register of Historic Places, is located one mile southwest of Coon Box.

According to the memoir of a man born in Adams County in 1830, Raccoon Box was a stop on the Natchez Trace: "At intervals of about six miles along this road, in the early settlement of the territory, little villages had been located as I remember, between Natchez and Port Gibson, first Washington, once the capital of the state, then Selsertown, Uniontown, Greenville, Raccoon Box, and one other, the name of which I have forgotten, Red Lick, I believe, and then Port Gibson. All of these villages are gone save only their names, and these forgotten except by a few old men like myself, and except that Washington still remains, a small village preserved perhaps by the college located there." According to the WPA history of Jefferson County, "'COONBOX' was the first postoffice established after Greenville, receiving its name in a peculiar manner. It was known as Vaughn's Stand, after a man by that name who kept an inn at the intersection of the Natchez Trace and Rodney–Shankstown Road. Mail for Shankstown and Cane Ridge settlements was received and delivered in a common mail box at the crossroads. In 1813 the mail carrier from Nashville, on opening the box, discovered a live raccoon therein. The story spread over the frontier, and from that time it was known as the Raccoon Box. the court minutes of April, 1821, this reference found: 'Ordered that Vaughn be allowed a permit to keep a tavern at his old stand at the Raccoon Box.'"

The name Raccoon Box is very old; the site was a gathering point for white settlers fleeing in panic from the Fort Mims Massacre during the Creek War in 1813. A local history writer in 1846 recorded that Raccoon Box was a point where several roads converged, writing "I now forget the origin of a name so euphonous, and where once rang the shout and huzza of the race course, the militia muster and the drunken rout and revel. For in those primitive times, men as now, met to talk, and drink, and fight; but if they did not indulge in old Madeira or sparkling Hock, they found a solace from the cares and vexations of a frontier life, in 'Ben Miller's' Whiskey. Then, on Saturdays, after the labors of the week were over, the entire neighborhood was collected, to run their horses on the race track, marked out for the express purpose, on the public highway, and settle little neighborhood disputes by a regular knock-down and gouge-my-eye-out argument."

According to a 1901 article in the journal of the Mississippi Historical Society, Coonbox was located two miles southwest of Shankstown, Mississippi, "at a point where the Union church and Rodney road crossed the Trace. The place derived its name from the following incident: During the War of 1812 an embargo was placed on Jamaica rum, the favorite beverage of that day. Although its sale was made illegal, it was still sold in egg shells, one egg for a 'flip,' two for a 'bit,' at the wayside houses throughout the country. The merchant prince, who had erected at the place mentioned above a log cabin store with a 'California built shed-room' in the rear, was doing a thriving business—selling eggs. One night a crowd of gentlemen from Greenville, passing by this store, decided that they wanted something to drink. The store was closed, and as no houses were at that time opened after dark to callers unless they were well known, these men got no response to their repeated knocks on the front door. Finally one of them jovially said that he would 'rouse the old coon out of his box behind by knocking on it.' He did so and the members of the party supplied themselves with eggs before resuming their journey. From that time to the present the place has been known as 'Coonbox.' It once had a hotel and stables, but both of these have long since disappeared." One 1904 history of Jefferson County described Coonbox as a "suburb" of Shankstown.
