= Woodburn Bridge =

- U.S. National Register of Historic Places
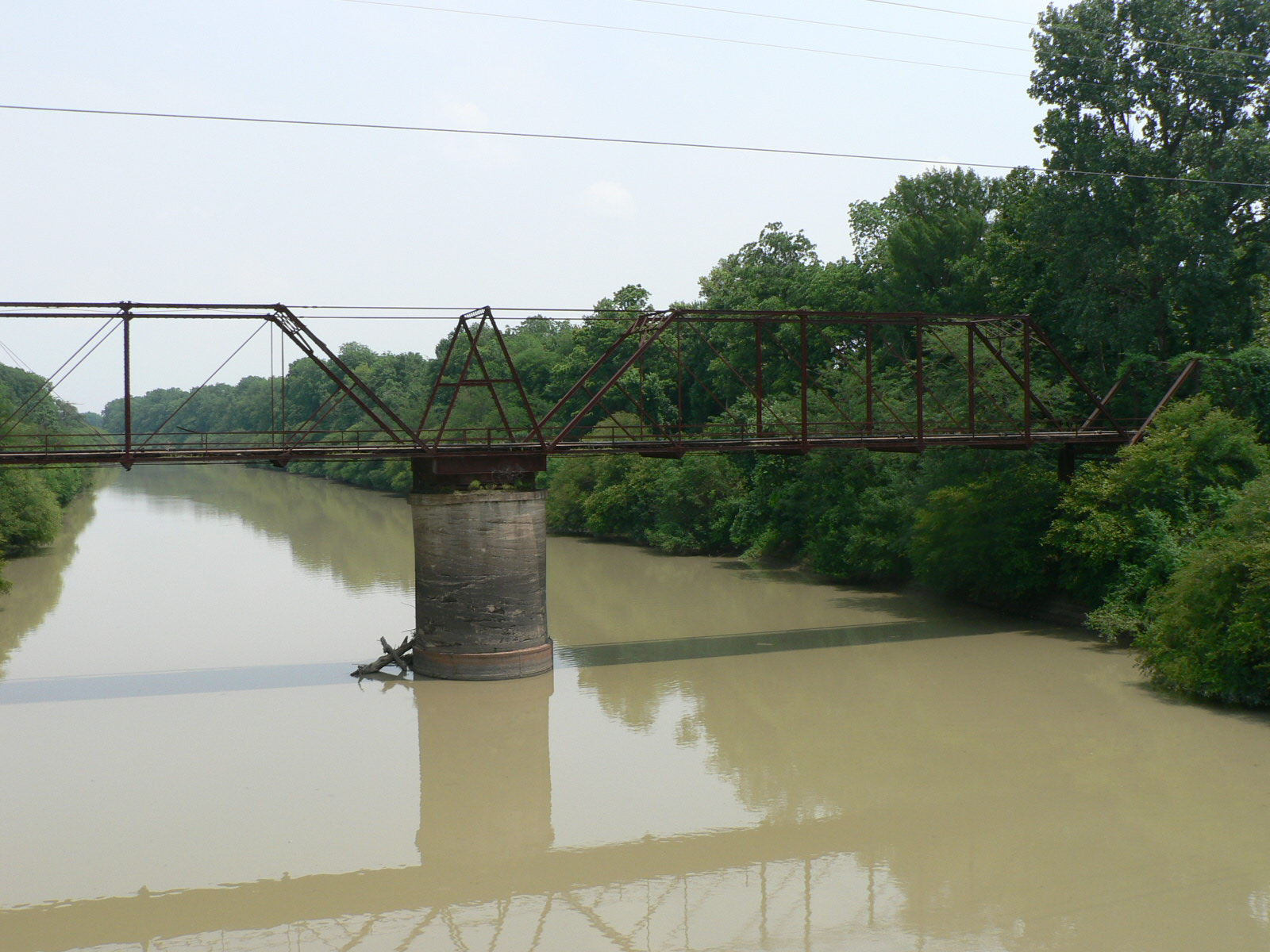

- Location within Mississippi Location within the United States
- Nearest city: Indianola, Mississippi
- Coordinates: 33°23′15″N 90°42′21″W
- Area: less than one acre
- Built: 1916
- Architectural style: Pratt truss swing bridge
- MPS: Historic Bridges of Mississippi TR
- NRHP reference No.: 88002492
- Added to NRHP: November 16, 1988

Woodburn Bridge is a historic truss bridge in Indianola, Mississippi.

The Pratt truss/swing truss bridge was built in 1916. The bridge was abandoned in 1985. The structure was added to the National Register of Historic Places in 1988.
