= Newton County, Mississippi =

County in Mississippi, United States

- County
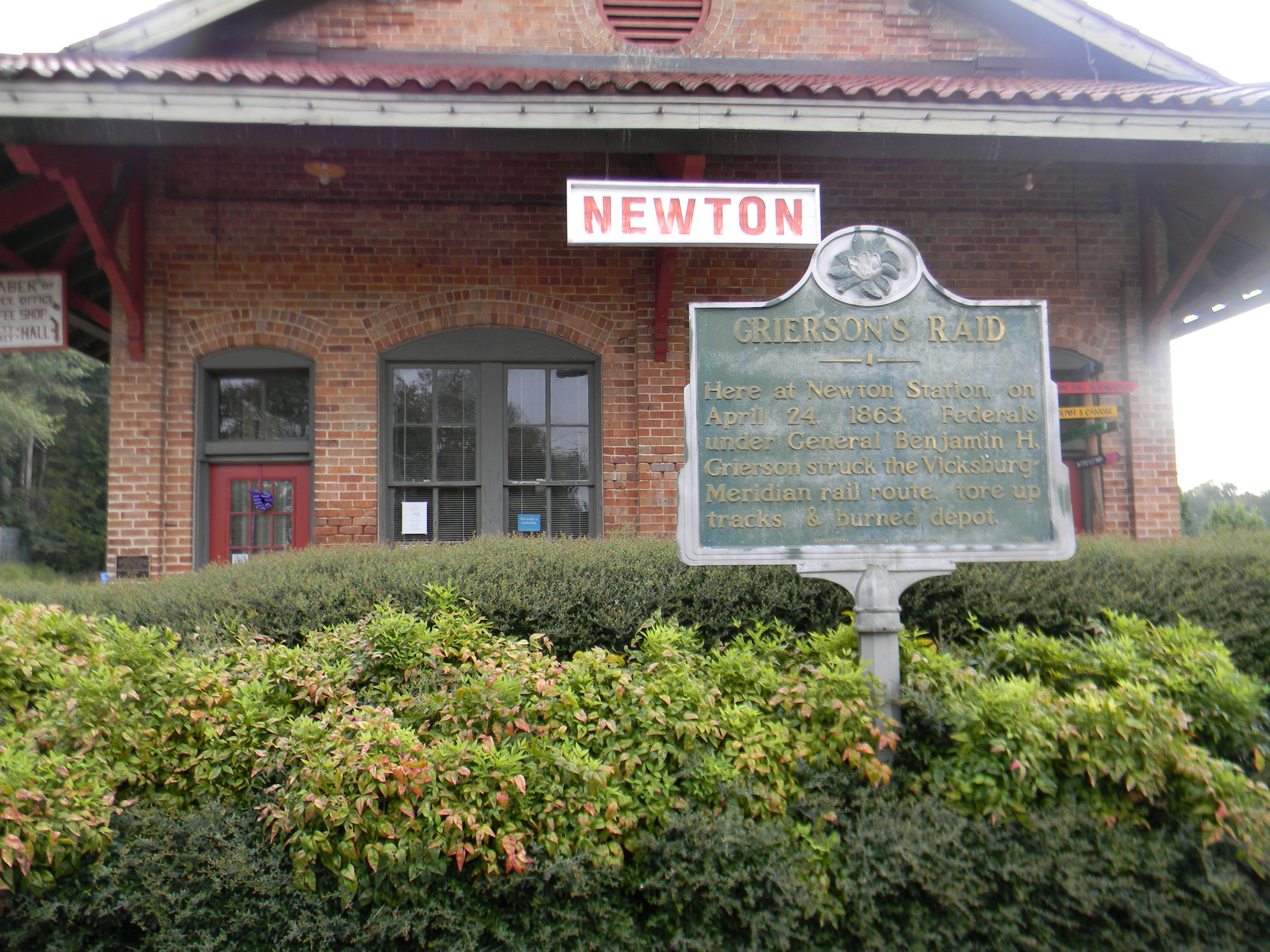
- Alabama and Vicksburg Railroad Depot

- Location within the U.S. state of Mississippi
- Coordinates: 32°25′N 89°07′W
- Country: United States
- State: Mississippi
- Founded: 1836
- Seat: Decatur
- Largest city: Newton

Area
  - Total: 580 sq mi (1,500 km^{2})
  - Land: 578 sq mi (1,500 km^{2})
  - Water: 1.5 sq mi (3.9 km^{2}) 0.3%

Population (2020)
  - Total: 21,291
  - Estimate (2025): 20,960 ▼
  - Density: 36.8/sq mi (14.2/km^{2})
- Time zone: UTC−6 (Central)
  - Summer (DST): UTC−5 (CDT)
- Congressional district: 3rd
- Website: www.newtoncountyms.net

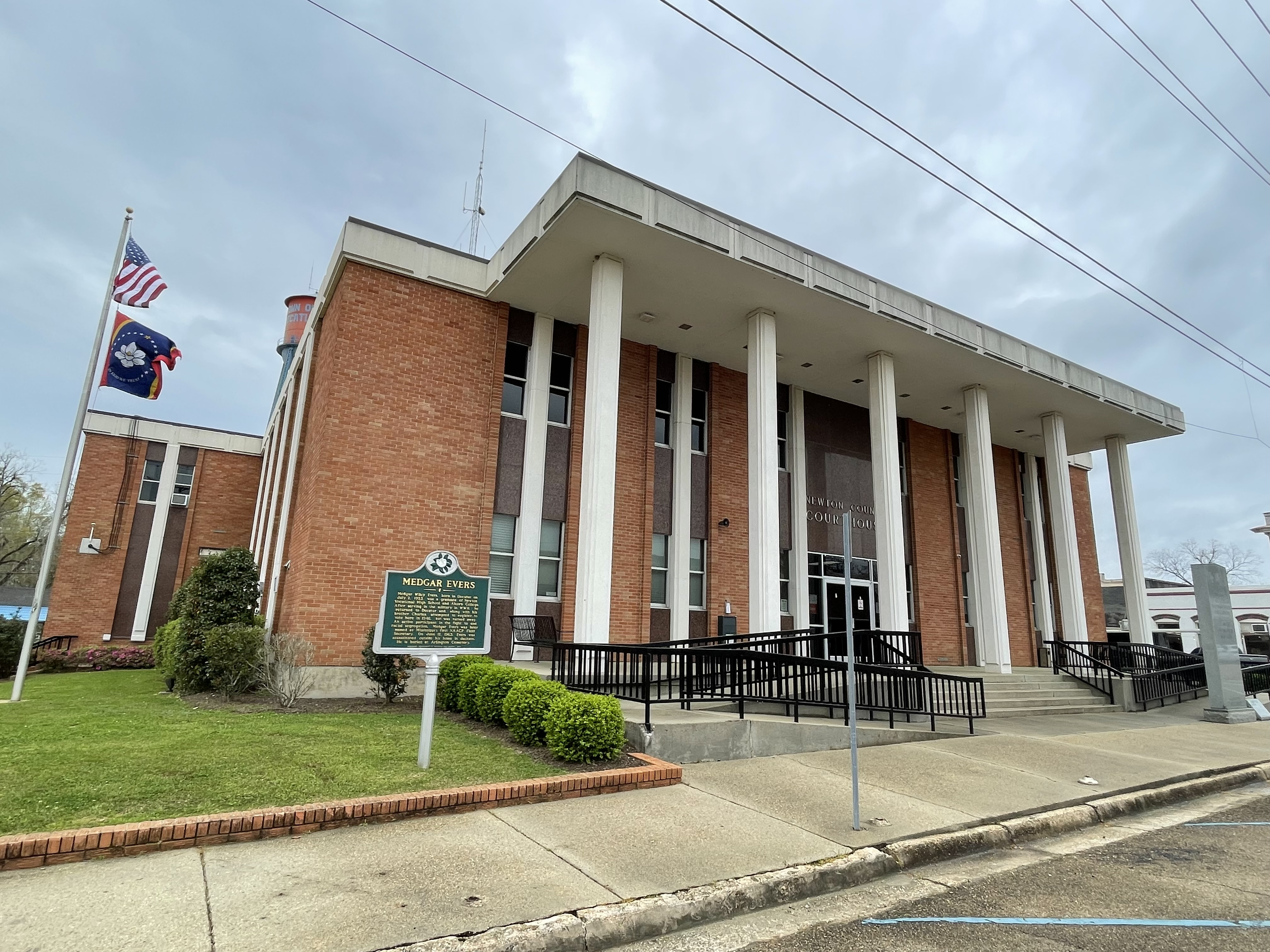
Newton County, Mississippi Court House

Newton County is a county located in the U.S. state of Mississippi. As of the 2020 census, the population was 21,291. Its county seat is Decatur.

== History ==
The land that would become Newton County was purchased from the Choctaw under the terms of the Treaty of Dancing Rabbit Creek. Newton County was split off from the southern part of Neshoba County and organized on February 26, 1836. The county is named for scientist Isaac Newton.

The Battle of Newton's Station was fought in the county on April 24, 1863, during Grierson's Raid of the American Civil War. Union troops pulled up railroad tracks and burned the depot at Newton's Station.

In February 1864, General William Tecumseh Sherman crossed the county, burning the county seat at Decatur and was nearly captured during the Meridian Campaign. Sherman stopped during the return trip from Meridian and slept at Boler's Inn in the town of Union.

On October 8, 1908, a Black sharecropper named Shep Jones had a dispute with his white employer regarding his work schedule. The altercation escalated, resulting in the employer's death. In response, a white mob terrorized the local Black community, destroying property, burning a church and meeting lodge near Gardlandville, and threatening families. Unable to locate Jones, the mob targeted and lynched his father-in-law, William Fielder, on October 9. The following day, the mob lynched two other Black men, Dee Dawkins and Frank Johnson, who were associated with Jones. The violence prompted many Black residents to flee Newton County. No one was held accountable for the lynchings or the destruction of property.

== Geography ==
According to the U.S. Census Bureau, the county has a total area of 580 square miles (1,500 km^{2}), of which 578 square miles (1,500 km^{2}) is land and 1.5 square miles (3.9 km^{2}) (0.3%) is water.

=== Major highways ===
- Interstate 20
- U.S. Highway 80
- Mississippi Highway 15

=== Adjacent counties ===
- Neshoba County (north)
- Lauderdale County (east)
- Jasper County (south)
- Scott County (west)

=== National protected area ===
- Bienville National Forest (part)

== Demographics ==
Historical population
Census	Pop.	Note	%±
1840	2,527		—
1850	4,465		76.7%
1860	9,661		116.4%
1870	10,067		4.2%
1880	13,436		33.5%
1890	16,625		23.7%
1900	19,708		18.5%
1910	23,085		17.1%
1920	20,727		−10.2%
1930	22,910		10.5%
1940	24,249		5.8%
1950	22,681		−6.5%
1960	19,517		−14.0%
1970	18,983		−2.7%
1980	19,944		5.1%
1990	20,291		1.7%
2000	21,838		7.6%
2010	21,720		−0.5%
2020	21,291		−2.0%
2025 (est.)	20,960	▼	−1.6%
U.S. Decennial Census; 1790-1960 1900-1990; 1990-2000 2010-2013

=== Racial and ethnic composition ===
Newton County, Mississippi – Racial and ethnic composition Note: the US Census treats Hispanic/Latino as an ethnic category. This table excludes Latinos from the racial categories and assigns them to a separate category. Hispanics/Latinos may be of any race.
Race / Ethnicity (NH = Non-Hispanic)	Pop 1980	Pop 1990	Pop 2000	Pop 2010	Pop 2020	% 1980	% 1990	% 2000	% 2010	% 2020
White alone (NH)	13,935	13,643	14,095	13,599	12,796	69.87%	67.24%	64.54%	62.61%	60.10%
Black or African American alone (NH)	5,356	5,826	6,617	6,536	6,447	26.86%	28.71%	30.30%	30.09%	30.28%
Native American or Alaska Native alone (NH)	491	723	796	1,072	1,169	2.46%	3.56%	3.65%	4.94%	5.49%
Asian alone (NH)	7	6	39	51	77	0.04%	0.03%	0.18%	0.23%	0.36%
Native Hawaiian or Pacific Islander alone (NH)	x	x	0	0	0	x	x	0.00%	0.00%	0.00%
Other race alone (NH)	0	8	9	9	29	0.00%	0.04%	0.04%	0.04%	0.14%
Mixed race or Multiracial (NH)	x	x	84	166	444	x	x	0.38%	0.76%	2.09%
Hispanic or Latino (any race)	155	85	198	287	329	0.78%	0.42%	0.91%	1.32%	1.55%
Total	19,944	20,291	21,838	21,720	21,291	100.00%	100.00%	100.00%	100.00%	100.00%

=== 2020 census ===
As of the 2020 census, the county had a population of 21,291. The median age was 39.1 years. 24.2% of residents were under the age of 18 and 18.2% of residents were 65 years of age or older. For every 100 females there were 90.1 males, and for every 100 females age 18 and over there were 87.9 males age 18 and over.

The racial makeup of the county was 60.4% White, 30.4% Black or African American, 5.5% American Indian and Alaska Native, 0.4% Asian, <0.1% Native Hawaiian and Pacific Islander, 0.8% from some other race, and 2.5% from two or more races. Hispanic or Latino residents of any race comprised 1.5% of the population.

<0.1% of residents lived in urban areas, while 100.0% lived in rural areas.

There were 8,024 households in the county, of which 32.5% had children under the age of 18 living in them. Of all households, 45.6% were married-couple households, 18.0% were households with a male householder and no spouse or partner present, and 31.6% were households with a female householder and no spouse or partner present. About 28.2% of all households were made up of individuals and 13.0% had someone living alone who was 65 years of age or older.

There were 9,073 housing units, of which 11.6% were vacant. Among occupied housing units, 77.2% were owner-occupied and 22.8% were renter-occupied. The homeowner vacancy rate was 1.5% and the rental vacancy rate was 5.6%.

=== 2000 census ===
As of the census of 2000, there were 21,838 people, 8,221 households, and 6,001 families residing in the county. The population density was 38 people per square mile (15 people/km^{2}). There were 9,259 housing units at an average density of 16 per square mile (6.2/km^{2}). The racial makeup of the county was 65.01% white, 30.37% black or African American, 3.68% Native American, 0.18% Asian, 0.33% from other races, and 0.44% from two or more races. 0.91% of the population were Hispanic or Latino of any race.

There were 8,221 households, out of which 33.50% had children under the age of 18 living with them, 53.00% were married couples living together, 16.00% had a female householder with no husband present, and 27.00% were non-families. 24.60% of all households were made up of individuals, and 11.60% had someone living alone who was 65 years of age or older. The average household size was 2.57 and the average family size was 3.04.

In the county, the population was spread out, with 26.20% under the age of 18, 11.20% from 18 to 24, 26.00% from 25 to 44, 21.70% from 45 to 64, and 14.90% who were 65 years of age or older. The median age was 35 years. For every 100 females there were 92.40 males. For every 100 females age 18 and over, there were 88.70 males.

The median income for a household in the county was $28,735, and the median income for a family was $34,606. Males had a median income of $27,820 versus $20,757 for females. The per capita income for the county was $14,008. About 16.40% of families and 19.90% of the population were below the poverty line, including 26.30% of those under age 18 and 21.70% of those age 65 or over.

== Communities ==
=== City ===
- Newton

=== Towns ===
- Chunky
- Decatur (county seat)
- Hickory
- Lake (mostly in Scott County)
- Union (partly in Neshoba County)

=== Census-designated place ===
- Conehatta

=== Unincorporated communities ===
- Battlefield
- Cedar Grove
- Duffee
- Lawrence
- Little Rock
- Perdue
- Stratton

=== Ghost towns ===
- Volcan

== Politics ==
Newton County is a longtime Republican stronghold, having not supported a Democratic presidential candidate since 1956.

United States presidential election results for Newton County, Mississippi
Year	Republican		Democratic		Third party(ies)	
Year	No.	%	No.	%	No.	%
1912	6	0.47%	1,197	94.62%	62	4.90%
1916	19	1.34%	1,341	94.70%	56	3.95%
1920	108	7.73%	1,208	86.41%	82	5.87%
1924	72	3.95%	1,657	90.94%	93	5.10%
1928	368	15.07%	2,074	84.93%	0	0.00%
1932	56	2.41%	2,253	97.11%	11	0.47%
1936	39	1.46%	2,624	98.42%	3	0.11%
1940	41	1.61%	2,495	98.27%	3	0.12%
1944	56	2.18%	2,516	97.82%	0	0.00%
1948	39	1.47%	169	6.38%	2,442	92.15%
1952	851	25.70%	2,460	74.30%	0	0.00%
1956	360	11.52%	2,359	75.46%	407	13.02%
1960	508	15.05%	912	27.01%	1,956	57.94%
1964	4,735	95.21%	238	4.79%	0	0.00%
1968	542	7.85%	799	11.58%	5,561	80.57%
1972	5,585	88.05%	597	9.41%	161	2.54%
1976	3,813	57.00%	2,741	40.97%	136	2.03%
1980	4,317	54.36%	3,455	43.51%	169	2.13%
1984	5,911	73.23%	2,127	26.35%	34	0.42%
1988	5,658	70.70%	2,332	29.14%	13	0.16%
1992	5,128	65.69%	2,146	27.49%	532	6.82%
1996	4,223	61.30%	2,163	31.40%	503	7.30%
2000	5,540	71.59%	2,147	27.75%	51	0.66%
2004	6,165	72.64%	2,280	26.86%	42	0.49%
2008	6,579	66.76%	3,218	32.65%	58	0.59%
2012	6,394	65.40%	3,319	33.95%	64	0.65%
2016	6,548	69.38%	2,756	29.20%	134	1.42%
2020	6,997	68.71%	3,075	30.20%	111	1.09%
2024	6,641	71.23%	2,603	27.92%	79	0.85%

== Education ==
School districts include:

- Newton County School District
- Newton Municipal School District
- Union Public School District

Conehatta Elementary School of the Choctaw Tribal School System is in the community.

Newton County Agricultural High School started operations in 1914. It became a part of the community college after that institution formed in 1928. In 1958 the students were moved to the Decatur School.

East Central Community College (formerly East Central Junior College) covers Newton County. Newton County was part of the college territory since fall 1928.

== See also ==
- Dry counties
- National Register of Historic Places listings in Newton County, Mississippi
