= Coon Box Fork Bridge =

- U.S. National Register of Historic Places
- Location within Mississippi Location within the United States
- Location: Coon Box Rd., Coon Box, Mississippi
- Coordinates: 31°47′25″N 91°5′37″W
- Area: 2 acres (0.81 ha)
- Built: 1919
- Architect: Schuster & Jacob, Robert Taylor
- Architectural style: Twin-tower Swng. Susp. Brdg.
- MPS: Swinging Suspension Bridges TR
- NRHP reference No.: 79003429
- Added to NRHP: May 23, 1979

The Coon Box Fork Bridge is a swinging suspension bridge located 1 mile (1.6 km) southwest of Coon Box in Jefferson County, Mississippi. The bridge carries Coon Box Road across the North Fork Coles Creek. Constructed in 1919 for $3,498.99, the bridge has a wooden deck and concrete towers plated in iron. The bridge was one of many of the same type constructed in Jefferson County in the early 1900s to serve farmers in Coon Box; it is considered a "highly successful technological product" and is in fair condition. The bridge was added to the National Register of Historic Places on May 23, 1979. The bridge was destroyed in 2015.
