= Bovina, Mississippi =

- Census-designated place
- Location within Mississippi Location within the United States
- Coordinates: 32°20′56″N 90°44′45″W
- Country: United States
- State: Mississippi
- County: Warren

Area
  - Total: 2.71 sq mi (7.01 km^{2})
  - Land: 2.70 sq mi (7.00 km^{2})
  - Water: 0.0039 sq mi (0.01 km^{2})
- Elevation: 262 ft (80 m)

Population (2020)
  - Total: 516
  - Density: 191.0/sq mi (73.73/km^{2})
- Time zone: UTC-6 (Central (CST))
  - Summer (DST): UTC-5 (CDT)
- GNIS feature ID: 2812750

Bovina is a census-designated place and unincorporated community located about 7 miles (11 km) east of Vicksburg in Warren County, Mississippi, on Interstate 20. It is part of the Vicksburg Micropolitan Statistical Area.

Per the 2020 Census, the population was 516.

== Demographics ==
Historical population
Census	Pop.	Note	%±
2020	516		—
U.S. Decennial Census; 2020

Bovina was first listed as a census designated place in the 2020 U.S. census.

=== 2020 census ===
Bovina CDP, Mississippi – Racial and ethnic composition Note: the US Census treats Hispanic/Latino as an ethnic category. This table excludes Latinos from the racial categories and assigns them to a separate category. Hispanics/Latinos may be of any race.
Race / Ethnicity (NH = Non-Hispanic)	Pop 2020	% 2020
White alone (NH)	305	59.11%
Black or African American alone (NH)	177	34.30%
Native American or Alaska Native alone (NH)	0	0.00%
Asian alone (NH)	5	0.97%
Native Hawaiian or Pacific Islander alone (NH)	0	0.00%
Other race alone (NH)	0	0.00%
Mixed race or Multiracial (NH)	25	4.84%
Hispanic or Latino (any race)	4	0.78%
Total	516	100.00%
