= Chunky, Mississippi =

Town in the United States

- Town
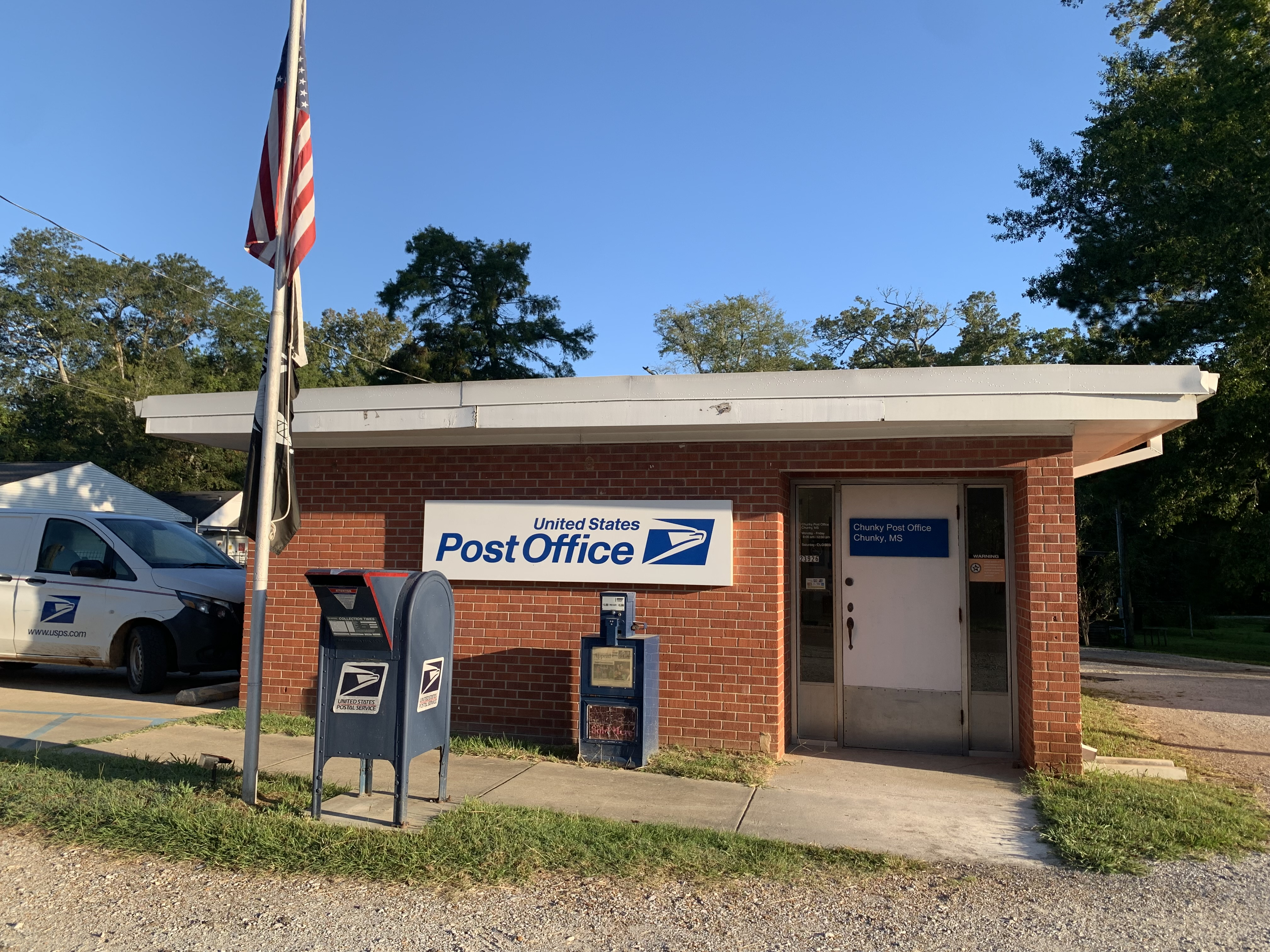
- Chunky Post Office

- Location of Chunky, Mississippi

- Location within the state of Mississippi Chunky, Mississippi (the United States)
- Coordinates: 32°19′33″N 88°55′41″W
- Country: United States
- State: Mississippi
- County: Newton
- Established: 1861

Government
  - Mayor: Aaron Clark

Area
  - Total: 0.83 sq mi (2.16 km^{2})
  - Land: 0.83 sq mi (2.16 km^{2})
  - Water: 0 sq mi (0.00 km^{2})
- Elevation: 318 ft (97 m)

Population (2020)
  - Total: 272
  - Density: 326.3/sq mi (125.99/km^{2})
- Time zone: UTC-6 (Central (CST))
  - Summer (DST): UTC-5 (CDT)
- ZIP code: 39323
- Area code: 601
- FIPS code: 28-13580
- GNIS feature ID: 668441

Chunky is a town in Newton County, Mississippi, United States. As of the 2020 census, Chunky had a population of 272.

== History ==
The town has roots as a Choctaw village named Chanki Chitto, which was named after the Choctaw game Tchungkee, a stickball game played with spears and polished stones. In 1811, the native American leader Tecumseh visited the village as he was building a confederacy of native American tribes. In 1848, the town of Chunkyville was established on the location. In 1861, upon news that a railway was to be built in the vicinity, Chunkyville was moved to its present location and was incorporated that year.

In 1863 a train carrying injured confederate veterans on the Southern Railroad crashed in Chunky. In 1864, a force commanded by William T. Sherman attacked two brigades of Confederate troops commanded by Stephen D. Lee and captured the Chunky railway station.

On June 16, 1911, a black man, William Bradford was lynched in Chunky. He was hanged by a mob after being accused of attempting to murder two white farmers.

== Geography ==
Chunky is located along the Chunky River. According to the United States Census Bureau, the town has a total area of 0.8 square miles (2.1 km^{2}), all land. Chunky is located 10 miles (16 km) west of Meridian. U.S. 80 passes through the town.

== Demographics ==
Historical population
Census	Pop.	Note	%±
1910	280		—
1920	272		−2.9%
1930	268		−1.5%
1940	228		−14.9%
1950	258		13.2%
1960	224		−13.2%
1970	280		25.0%
1980	277		−1.1%
1990	292		5.4%
2000	344		17.8%
2010	326		−5.2%
2020	272		−16.6%
U.S. Decennial Census

As of the census of 2010, there were 326 people, 120 households, and 95 families residing in the town. The population density was 412.9 people per square mile (159.4 people/km^{2}). There were 136 housing units at an average density of 163.2 per square mile (63.0/km^{2}). The racial makeup of the town was 87.79% White, 1.74% African American, 9.30% from Choctaw races, and 1.16% from two or more races. Hispanic or Latino of any race were 10.76% of the population.

There were 120 households, out of which 37.5% had children under the age of 18 living with them, 65.8% were married couples living together, 10.0% had a female householder with no husband present, and 20.8% were non-families. 18.3% of all households were made up of individuals, and 11.7% had someone living alone who was 65 years of age or older. The average household size was 2.87 and the average family size was 3.28.

In the town, the population was spread out, with 27.0% under the age of 18, 9.9% from 18 to 24, 29.4% from 25 to 44, 18.6% from 45 to 64, and 15.1% who were 65 years of age or older. The median age was 35 years. For every 100 females, there were 97.7 males. For every 100 females age 18 and over, there were 96.1 males.

The median income for a household in the town was $34,861, and the median income for a family was $45,313. Males had a median income of $32,813 versus $26,000 for females. The per capita income for the town was $14,498. About 16.2% of families and 16.6% of the population were below the poverty line, including 13.8% of those under age 18 and 12.7% of those age 65 or over.

== Education ==
The Town of Chunky is served by the Newton County School District.

Some of the households within the 39323 postal district, which are not in the town limits, are in the West Lauderdale school district, part of the Lauderdale County School District.

== Infrastructure ==
=== Railroads ===
The Kansas City Southern Railroad goes through Chunky. Approximately 25 freight trains per day travel through the town. On each side of Chunky, there are 9,000-foot (2,700 m) sidings at Meehan Junction to the east, and Hickory to the west. The railroad crosses the Chunky River in two places just east of town, and between these two trestles is a very popular photography spot for train buffs to take photos of the trains as they cross the river. The railroad crosses the Chunky River west of town on a much smaller trestle, known locally as "break down". It was on this site that the trestle collapsed under a troop-carrying train of Confederate soldiers during the American Civil War; the wreck is called the Chunky Creek Train Wreck of 1863. A Confederate regiment of Choctaw Indians camping nearby saved many lives of soldiers who had been thrown into the raging flood swollen river.
