= Newton, Mississippi =

- City
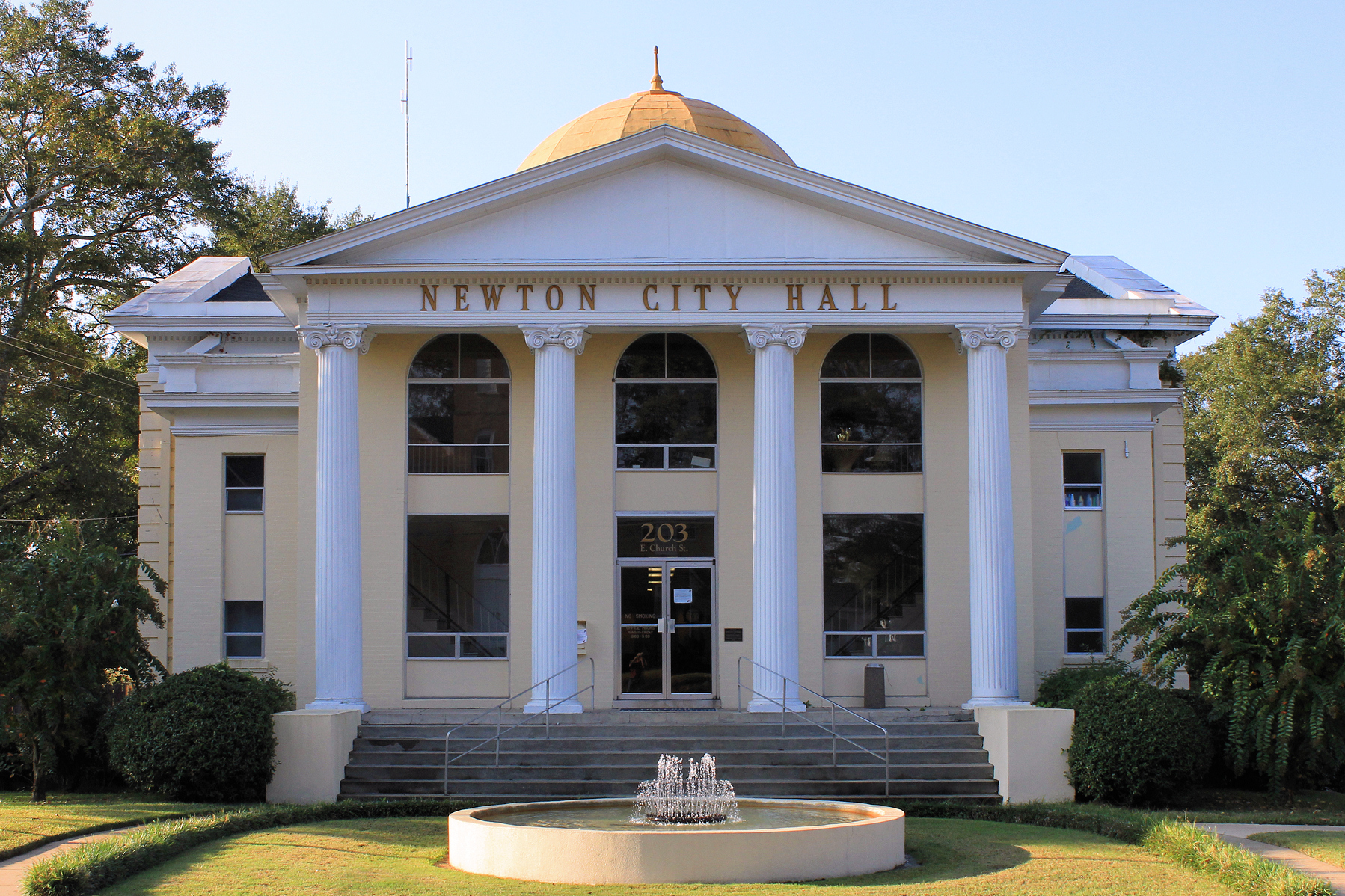
- Newton City Hall

- Flag Seal

- Location of Newton, Mississippi

- Location in the United States
- Coordinates: 32°19′17″N 89°09′48″W
- Country: United States
- State: Mississippi
- County: Newton

Government
  - Mayor: Jay Powell (D)

Area
  - Total: 7.17 sq mi (18.57 km^{2})
  - Land: 7.15 sq mi (18.53 km^{2})
  - Water: 0.015 sq mi (0.04 km^{2})
- Elevation: 423 ft (129 m)

Population (2020)
  - Total: 3,195
  - Density: 446.7/sq mi (172.46/km^{2})
- Time zone: UTC-6 (Central (CST))
  - Summer (DST): UTC-5 (CDT)
- ZIP code: 39345
- Area code: 601
- FIPS code: 28-51720
- Website: City of Newton

Newton is a city in Newton County, Mississippi. The population was 3,195 in the 2020 census. The population is about 70 percent Black Americans.

== History ==
The Battle of Newton's Station was fought here on April 24, 1863 during the famous Grierson's Raid by the Union Army cavalry regiments in a brigade commanded by Col. Benjamin Grierson (1826-1911). This was an important action during the long Vicksburg campaign of a siege and battle to take the port town of Vicksburg and fortress on the Mississippi River by Federal Gen. Ulysses S. Grant and split the southern Confederacy during the American Civil War (1861-1865).

On February 13, 1948, a tornado, with an estimated intensity of F3 on the Fujita scale, impacted the town, killing five people and destroying 30 homes.

== Geography ==
Newton is located south of I-20 and U.S. Route 80 approximately 25 miles west of Meridian in south central Newton County. Potterchitto Creek flows past the west and north sides of the city.

According to the United States Census Bureau, the city has a total area of 7.2 square miles (19 km^{2}), of which 7.2 square miles (19 km^{2}) is land and 0.14% is water.

=== Climate ===
Newton has a humid subtropical climate (Köppen Cfa) with long, hot summers and short, mild winters.

Climate data for Newton Experiment Station, Mississippi (1991–2020 normals, extremes 1948–2023)
Month	Jan	Feb	Mar	Apr	May	Jun	Jul	Aug	Sep	Oct	Nov	Dec	Year
Record high °F (°C)	81 (27)	85 (29)	89 (32)	93 (34)	97 (36)	103 (39)	104 (40)	107 (42)	104 (40)	100 (38)	91 (33)	84 (29)	107 (42)
Mean maximum °F (°C)	73.9 (23.3)	77.4 (25.2)	83.1 (28.4)	86.1 (30.1)	91.8 (33.2)	95.8 (35.4)	98.3 (36.8)	98.2 (36.8)	95.9 (35.5)	90.2 (32.3)	81.7 (27.6)	75.8 (24.3)	99.8 (37.7)
Mean daily maximum °F (°C)	58.1 (14.5)	62.6 (17.0)	70.1 (21.2)	77.1 (25.1)	84.4 (29.1)	90.7 (32.6)	93.2 (34.0)	92.9 (33.8)	89.0 (31.7)	79.7 (26.5)	68.3 (20.2)	60.6 (15.9)	77.2 (25.1)
Daily mean °F (°C)	45.6 (7.6)	49.3 (9.6)	56.3 (13.5)	63.5 (17.5)	71.7 (22.1)	78.7 (25.9)	81.3 (27.4)	80.5 (26.9)	75.7 (24.3)	64.8 (18.2)	54.0 (12.2)	48.1 (8.9)	64.1 (17.8)
Mean daily minimum °F (°C)	33.0 (0.6)	36.0 (2.2)	42.6 (5.9)	49.8 (9.9)	59.0 (15.0)	66.6 (19.2)	69.3 (20.7)	68.2 (20.1)	62.3 (16.8)	49.9 (9.9)	39.7 (4.3)	35.6 (2.0)	51.0 (10.6)
Mean minimum °F (°C)	16.4 (−8.7)	20.7 (−6.3)	25.6 (−3.6)	33.1 (0.6)	43.5 (6.4)	55.9 (13.3)	61.6 (16.4)	60.0 (15.6)	47.9 (8.8)	32.7 (0.4)	23.9 (−4.5)	20.8 (−6.2)	14.2 (−9.9)
Record low °F (°C)	−4 (−20)	4 (−16)	14 (−10)	26 (−3)	36 (2)	40 (4)	51 (11)	49 (9)	34 (1)	19 (−7)	14 (−10)	1 (−17)	−4 (−20)
Average precipitation inches (mm)	5.76 (146)	5.54 (141)	5.39 (137)	6.12 (155)	4.08 (104)	4.90 (124)	4.83 (123)	4.64 (118)	3.24 (82)	3.83 (97)	4.60 (117)	5.54 (141)	58.47 (1,485)
Average snowfall inches (cm)	0.3 (0.76)	0.1 (0.25)	0.0 (0.0)	0.0 (0.0)	0.0 (0.0)	0.0 (0.0)	0.0 (0.0)	0.0 (0.0)	0.0 (0.0)	0.0 (0.0)	0.0 (0.0)	0.0 (0.0)	0.4 (1.0)
Average precipitation days (≥ 0.01 in)	10.9	9.5	9.9	8.4	8.8	10.2	11.7	9.9	6.6	6.5	8.4	10.7	111.5
Average snowy days (≥ 0.1 in)	0.2	0.1	0.1	0.0	0.0	0.0	0.0	0.0	0.0	0.0	0.0	0.0	0.4
Source: NOAA

== Demographics ==
Historical population
Census	Pop.	Note	%±
1870	154		—
1900	537		—
1910	1,878		249.7%
1920	1,604		−14.6%
1930	2,011		25.4%
1940	1,800		−10.5%
1950	2,912		61.8%
1960	3,178		9.1%
1970	3,556		11.9%
1980	3,708		4.3%
1990	3,701		−0.2%
2000	3,699		−0.1%
2010	3,373		−8.8%
2020	3,195		−5.3%
U.S. Decennial Census

=== Racial and ethnic composition ===
Newton city, Mississippi – Racial and ethnic composition Note: the US Census treats Hispanic/Latino as an ethnic category. This table excludes Latinos from the racial categories and assigns them to a separate category. Hispanics/Latinos may be of any race.
Race / Ethnicity (NH = Non-Hispanic)	Pop 2000	Pop 2010	Pop 2020	% 2000	% 2010	% 2020
White alone (NH)	1,613	1,213	833	43.61%	35.96%	26.07%
Black or African American alone (NH)	2,019	2,092	2,225	54.58%	62.02%	69.64%
Native American or Alaska Native alone (NH)	3	2	4	0.08%	0.06%	0.13%
Asian alone (NH)	23	10	11	0.62%	0.30%	0.34%
Native Hawaiian or Pacific Islander alone (NH)	0	0	0	0.00%	0.00%	0.00%
Other race alone (NH)	0	3	11	0.00%	0.09%	0.34%
Mixed race or Multiracial (NH)	9	21	71	0.24%	0.62%	2.22%
Hispanic or Latino (any race)	32	32	40	0.87%	0.95%	1.25%
Total	3,699	3,373	3,195	100.00%	100.00%	100.00%

=== 2020 census ===
As of the 2020 census, Newton had a population of 3,195, with 1,289 households and 877 families. The median age was 40.0 years. 24.9% of residents were under the age of 18 and 19.7% were 65 years of age or older. For every 100 females, there were 81.6 males, and for every 100 females age 18 and over, there were 75.8 males age 18 and over.

0.0% of residents lived in urban areas, while 100.0% lived in rural areas.

Of the city's households, 32.7% had children under the age of 18 living in them. Of all households, 29.0% were married-couple households, 19.5% were households with a male householder and no spouse or partner present, and 45.5% were households with a female householder and no spouse or partner present. About 34.8% of all households were made up of individuals, and 15.2% had someone living alone who was 65 years of age or older.

There were 1,470 housing units, of which 12.3% were vacant. The homeowner vacancy rate was 4.6% and the rental vacancy rate was 5.3%.

Racial composition as of the 2020 census
Race	Number	Percent
White	843	26.4%
Black or African American	2,227	69.7%
American Indian and Alaska Native	6	0.2%
Asian	11	0.3%
Native Hawaiian and Other Pacific Islander	0	0.0%
Some other race	21	0.7%
Two or more races	87	2.7%

=== 2000 census ===
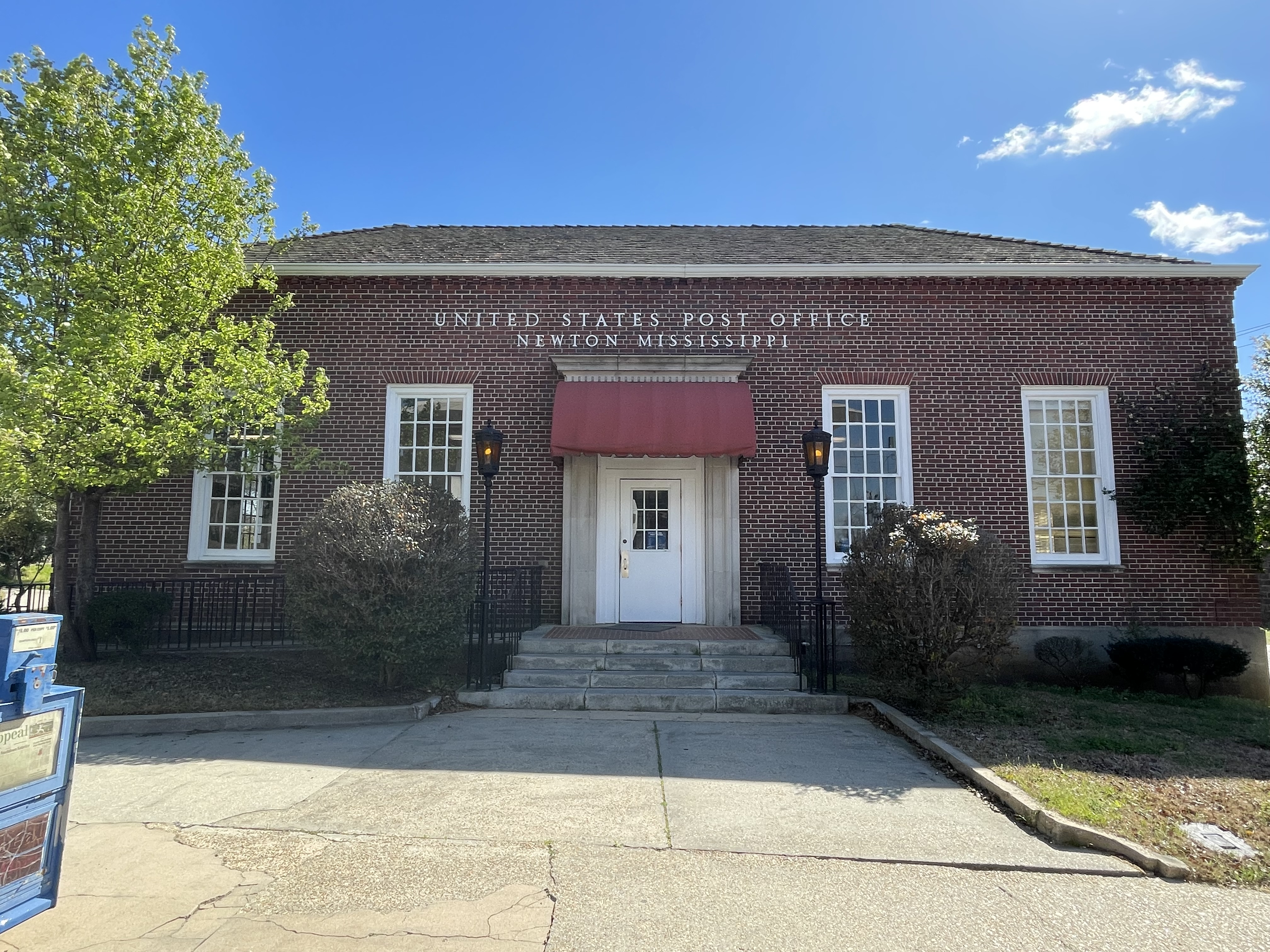
Post office in Newton

As of 2000, there were 3,674 people, 1,420 households, and 971 families residing in the city. The population density was 516.7 inhabitants per square mile (199.5/km^{2}). There were 1,638 housing units at an average density of 228.8 per square mile (88.3/km^{2}). The racial makeup of the city was 43.90% White, 54.69% African American, 0.14% Native American, 0.62% Asian, 0.19% from other races, and 0.46% from two or more races. Hispanic or Latino of any race were 0.87% of the population.

There were 1,420 households, out of which 30.8% had children under the age of 18 living with them, 42.1% were married couples living together, 22.3% had a female householder with no husband present, and 31.6% were non-families. 29.5% of all households were made up of individuals, and 14.0% had someone living alone who was 65 years of age or older. The average household size was 2.50 and the average family size was 3.07.

In the city, the population was spread out, with 27.4% under the age of 18, 9.4% from 18 to 24, 24.4% from 25 to 44, 19.6% from 45 to 64, and 19.2% who were 65 years of age or older. The median age was 37 years. For every 100 females, there were 80.4 males. For every 100 females age 18 and over, there were 74.3 males.

The median income for a household in the city was $30,067, and the median income for a family was $32,527. Males had a median income of $26,471 versus $19,333 for females. The per capita income for the city was $15,476. About 20.1% of families and 24.9% of the population were below the poverty line, including 35.2% of those under age 18 and 17.6% of those age 65 or over.

== Education ==
The City of Newton is served by the Newton Municipal School District.

== Notable people ==
- Oree Banks, head football coach at South Carolina State University from 1965 to 1972 and at the West Virginia State University from 1977 to 1983
- Francis S. Bowling, justice of the Supreme Court of Mississippi from 1977 to 1984
- Arthur B. Clark, member of the Mississippi House of Representatives (lower chamber of the Mississippi Legislature) from 1916 to 1924
- James Evans, member of the Mississippi House of Representatives, (lower chamber of the Mississippi Legislature) from the 70th District
- John Crumpton Hardy, president of the Mississippi State College (now the Mississippi State University) from 1900 to 1912
- Stan Hindman, former professional American football defensive lineman in the National Football League for seven seasons for the San Francisco 49ers
- Jimbeau Hinson, country music singer-songwriter
- Shorty McWilliams, former player for the Pittsburgh Steelers of the National Football League (NFL) and earlier for the Los Angeles Dons in the All America Football Conference before its merger in 1949 with the NFL
- Paul Overstreet, country singer/songwriter
- Richard Parks, fantasy, science fiction and horror writer
- Joe Tanner, former Major League Baseball and Minor League Baseball player, coach and scout for various teams and inventor
- Elton Watkins, United States Representative (congressman) in the United States House of Representatives (lower chamber of the United States Congress), representing Oregon's 3rd congressional district from 1923 to 1925
