= List of museums in Mississippi =

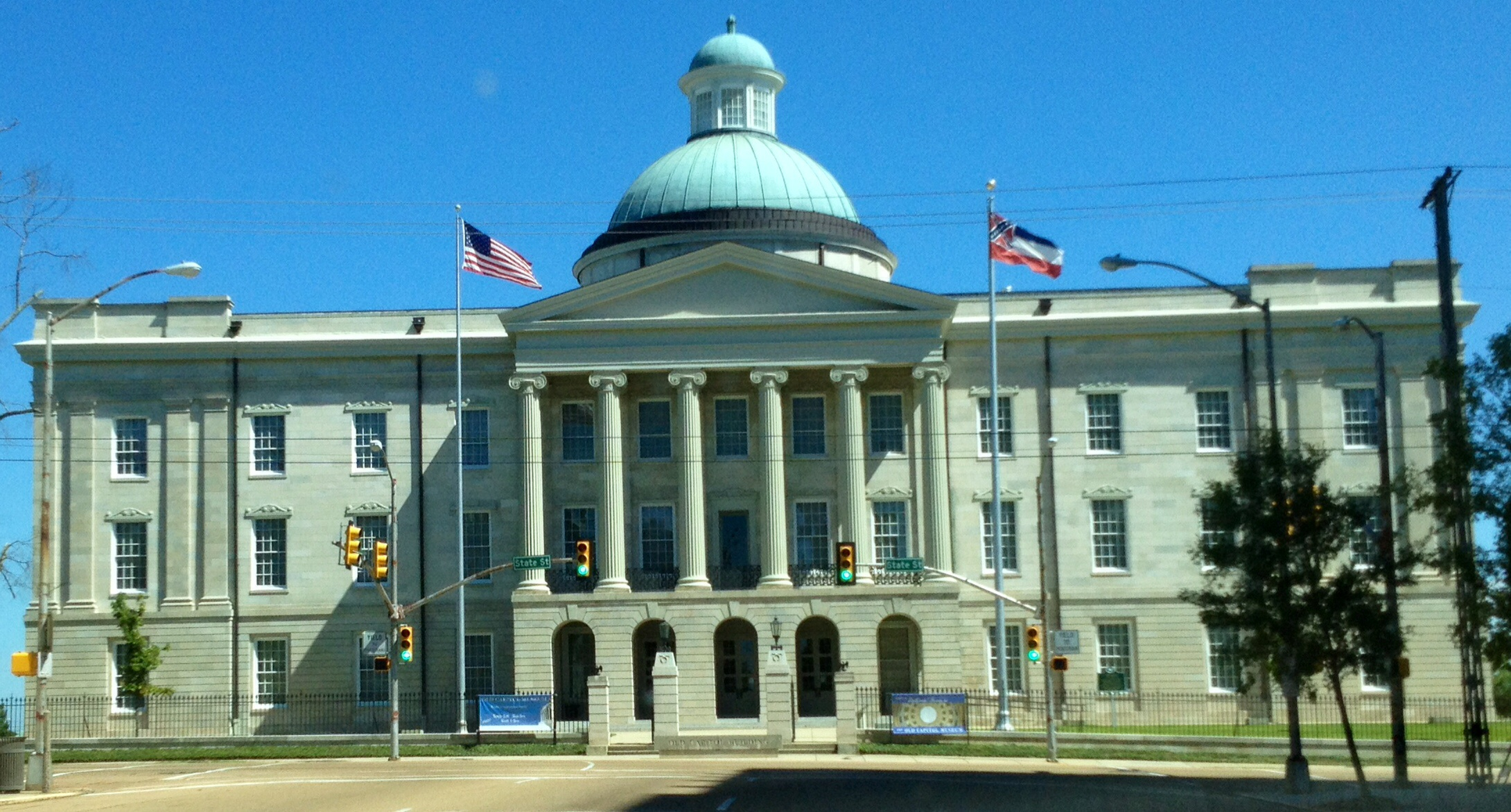
Old Mississippi State Capitol Museum

This list of museums in Mississippi encompasses museums which are defined for this context as institutions (including nonprofit organizations, government entities, and private businesses) that collect and care for objects of cultural, artistic, scientific, or historical interest and make their collections or related exhibits available for public viewing. Museums that exist only in cyberspace (i.e., virtual museums) are not included.

Mississippi has a relatively large number of museums focused on Blues music (noted under "Music" in the type column of the table below).

The "Regions" column in the table refers to regional areas with boundaries used by the Mississippi Convention and Visitors Bureau (but with neutral names), as described in the "Regions" section below.

== Museums ==
Name	Image	Location	County	Region	Type	Notes
1927 Flood Museum		Greenville	Washington	Delta	Local history	History of the Great Mississippi Flood of 1927
Africa House YA Providence Educultural Resource Museum & Gallery		Natchez	Adams	Southwest	Ethnic (African American)	Open by appointment, includes paintings, artifacts, carvings, videos, tools, photographs of European enslavement forts, instruments, traveling exhibits
African American Military History Museum		Hattiesburg	Forrest	Southeast	Ethnic (African American/Military)	website, 150 years of African-American military history; artifacts, photos and displays; has extensive set of Spanish–American War medals
Alice Moseley Folk Art and Antique Museum		Bay St. Louis	Hancock	Southeast	Art	website, museum located upstairs in former train depot
American Contract Bridge League Museum		Horn Lake	DeSoto	North	Sports	website, exhibits on Civil War, African-American history, renovated cabin, Jerry Lee Lewis
Amory Regional Museum		Amory	Monroe	North	Local history	website
Auburn		Natchez	Adams	Southwest	Historic house	Built about 1812; red brick mansion
B.B. King Museum and Delta Interpretive Center		Indianola	Sunflower	Southeast	Biographical, Music (Blues)	website, Features displays on B.B. King and the cotton gin where he worked and other Blues musicians from the Delta
Beauvoir		Biloxi	Harrison	Southeast	Biographical	Historic house that includes the Jefferson Davis Presidential Library
Bench Mark Works Motorcycle Museum & Campground		Sturgis	Oktibbeha	East Central	Transportation (Motorcycles)	Website, pre-1970 Bench Mark Works motorcycles
Biedenharn Museum and Gardens		Vicksburg	Warren	Southwest	Commodity (Coca Cola)	Website, Coca-Cola history and memorabilia
Biloxi Lighthouse		Biloxi	Harrison	Southeast	Maritime	Website, 1848 lighthouse open for tours
Biloxi Mardi Gras Museum		Biloxi	Harrison	Southeast	History	Located in the Magnolia Hotel, costumes, photographs and memorabilia of carnival celebrations along the coast
Black History Gallery		McComb	Pike	Southwest	Ethnic (African American)	Displays African American pictures, books and historical materials
Boler's Inn Museum		Union	Newton	East Central	Historic site	information, information
"Boo" Ferriss Baseball Museum		Cleveland	Bolivar	Delta	Biographical	Life of baseball great Dave Ferriss, located in the Crawford Center of Delta State University
Brices Cross Roads National Battlefield Site		Baldwyn	Lee	North	Military	Civil War battlefield and visitor center with exhibits
Busted Wrench Garage Museum		Gulfport	Harrison	Southeast	Transportation	website, free classic and vintage car museum and with assorted other vehicles
Camp Van Dorn World War II Museum		Centreville	Wilkinson	Southwest	Military	website, history of Camp Van Dorn, training camp for 40,000 soldiers in World War II from 1942-1945; has sections on the town of Centreville, the camp, and the war
Canton Movie Museums		Canton	Madison	Southwest	Media	website, two museums about films made in the area, one about the film A Time to Kill, one about My Dog Skip
Canton Multicultural Center & Museum		Canton	Madison	Southwest	Ethnic (African American)	Website
Canton Train Museum		Canton	Madison	Southwest	Railroad	website, historic train depot
Catfish Museum and Welcome Center		Belzoni	Humphreys	Delta	Industry	website, on the farm-raised catfish industry, also local art
Causeyville General Store and Mill		Meridian	Lauderdale	East Central	History	photos, general store from about 1895, gristmill, mechanical music museum, country memorabilia
Center for Marine Education and Research		Gulfport	Harrison	Southeast	Natural history	Part of the Institute for Marine Mammal Studies, interactive exhibits, life-size replicas of sea creatures, touch tanks and aquariums, requires reservations
Century of History Museum		Greenville	Washington	Delta	Ethnic (Jewish)	website, at the Hebrew Union Temple, Jewish history in the Delta region
Center for the Study of Southern Culture (Gammill Gallery)		Oxford	Lafayette	North	Culture	Exhibits of documentary photography of the American South
Charles H. Templeton, Sr. Music Museum		Starkville	Oktibbeha	East Central	Music	website, part of the Mitchell Memorial Library at MSU, musical instruments, recordings and sheet music
Charles W. Capps, Jr. Archives and Museum		Cleveland	Bolivar	Delta	Multiple	website, part of Delta State University, changing exhibits of history and culture from its collections and traveling exhibits
Clinton Community Nature Center		Clinton	Hinds	Southwest	Nature center	website, museum/education building, 33 acres (130,000 m^{2}) of woodland, 2.5 miles (4.0 km) of walking trails, labeled native trees and flowers
Choctaw Museum		Choctaw	Neshoba	East Central	Ethnic (Native American)	Website, history and culture of the Mississippi Band of Choctaw Indians
Corinth Civil War Interpretive Center		Corinth	Alcorn	North	Military	website, part of Shiloh National Military Park
Corinth Crossroads Museum		Corinth	Alcorn	North	Local history	website, housed in a railroad depot, includes local, railroad and Civil War history, Coca-Cola memorabilia and drink machines
Cullis & Gladys Wade Clock Museum		Starkville	Oktibbeha	East Central	Horology	website, part of the Mississippi State University, American clocks and watches, located in the lobby of the Mississippi State University Welcome Center
Deason Home		Ellisville	Jones	Southeast	Historic house	Open by appointment with the Tallahala Chapter of the Daughters of the American Revolution
Delta Blues Museum		Clarksdale	Coahoma	Delta	Music (Blues)	Blues music and performers
Delta State University Sculpture Garden		Cleveland	Bolivar	Delta	Art	website, showcases the work of regional and national sculptors
DeSoto County Museum		Hernando	DeSoto	North	Local history	website, exhibits on Civil War, African-American history, renovated cabin, Jerry Lee Lewis
Dunleith		Natchez	Adams	Southwest	Historic house	Antebellum mansion estate with outbuildings
Dunn-Seiler Geology Museum		Starkville	Oktibbeha	East Central	Geology	website, part of the Mississippi State University, rocks, minerals, fossils and meteorites
E.E. Bass Cultural Arts Center		Greenville	Washington	Delta	Art	Operated by the Greenville Arts Council, features Roger D. Malkin Gallery that hosts six to eight exhibitions per year featuring local, regional, and national artists, and the Delta Children's Museum Pavilion with an Armitage Herschell carousel
Elvis Presley Birthplace		Tupelo	Lee	North	Biographical	Includes the birthplace home and museum of Elvis Presley, and a chapel
Emmett Till Historic Intrepid Center		Glendora	Tallahatchie	Delta	Ethnic (African American)	website, story of murder of Emmett Till and local African American culture and history
Ethel Wright Mohamed Stitchery Museum		Belzoni	Humphreys	Delta	Art	website, stitched memory pictures representative of Mississippi Delta family life. Some of her pieces are in the collection of the Smithsonian Institution
Eudora Welty House		Jackson	Hinds	Southwest	Historic house	website, Home of author Eudora Welty
Frank and Virginia Williams Collection of Lincolniana		Starkville	Oktibbeha	East Central	History	website, part of Mitchell Memorial Library at MSU, collection of Lincoln era artifacts and exhibits. Located in the same area as the Ulysses S. Grant Presidential Library
French Camp Historic Area		French Camp	Choctaw	East Central	Open-air	website, includes 1846 log cabin, visitors center, crafts and sorghum mill, antebellum home
F.W. Williams Home		Meridian	Lauderdale	East Central	Historic house	1886 Victorian period home
G.I. Museum		Ocean Springs	Jackson	Southeast	Military	website, almost entirely devoted to World War II, includes uniformed mannequins, period weapons, a 1943 Jeep and home-front items
Gallery 130		Oxford	Lafayette	North	Art	website, located in Meek Hall, operated by the Art Department of the University of Mississippi, exhibitions by undergraduate and graduate students
Gateway to the Blues Visitors Center and Museum		Tunica	Tunica	Delta	Music	Located in a historic depot, history of how The Blues was born and the role Tunica played in building the genre's legacy
Grand Gulf Military Park		Port Gibson	Claiborne	Southwest	Historic site	Civil War battle site, includes museum, historic buildings, cemetery, observation tower
Grand Village of the Natchez Indians		Natchez	Adams	Southwest	Archaeology (Native American)	website, Site of a ceremonial mound center for the Natchez tribe from 1200-1730; Museum, reconstructed mounds and a dwelling
Greene County Museum		Leakesville	Greene	Southeast	Local history	Former courthouse built about 1939, features local history and prehistoric Indian artifacts
Greenville Air Force Base Museum		Greenville	Washington	Delta	Aviation	Located on the second floor of the Mid-Delta Regional Airport, history of Greenville Air Force Base
Greenville History Museum		Greenville	Washington	Delta	Local history	website
Greenwood Blues Heritage Museum & Gallery		Greenwood	Leflore	Delta	Music (Blues)	Exhibits on Robert Johnson and other central Delta blues artists
Grenada Historical Museum		Grenada	Grenada	North	Local history	Located in City Hall, includes Coca-Cola display
Grenada Lake Visitors Center Museum		Grenada	Grenada	North	Natural history	website, animal displays, lake history, wildlife scenes, informational videos, a telescope overlook point
Gulf Islands National Seashore Visitor Center		Ocean Springs	Jackson	Southeast	Natural history	William M. Colmer Visitor Center for barrier islands in Mississippi, has exhibits, nature trails, ranger programs, campground and picnic areas
Hattiesburg Area Historical Society Museum		Hattiesburg	Forrest	Southeast	Local history	website, housed in the Hattiesburg Cultural Center
Highway 61 Blues Museum		Leland	Washington	Delta	Music (Blues)	website
Historic Jefferson College		Washington	Adams	Southwest	Education	First educational institution of higher learning in Mississippi
Hartley Peavey Visitor Center		Meridian	Lauderdale	East Central	Music	Memorabilia related to Peavey Electronics and its notable users of its guitars, amplifiers and keyboards
Holland Museum		Brookhaven	Lincoln	Southwest	History	Replica of country store with items used in yesteryear, open by appointment
Holliday Haven		Aberdeen	Monroe	North	Historic house	Restored Greek Revival mansion built about 1850, with original furnishings and memorabilia
Holloway-Polk House		Prentiss	Jefferson Davis	South	Historic house	website, restored southern plantation home built circa. 1864 - the only surviving continuously lived-in antebellum home in Jefferson Davis County
House on Ellicott's Hill		Natchez	Adams	Southwest	Historic house	Owned by the Natchez Garden Club, restored late 18th-century house
Howlin' Wolf Museum		West Point	Clay	East Central	Music - Blues / Biography	website, includes artifacts of Howlin' Wolf, the Black Prairie Region, Big Joe Williams, Bukka White, located in the Friday House
Humphreys County Cultural Museum		Belzoni	Humphreys	Delta	African American	website
Ida B. Wells Barnett Museum		Holly Springs	Marshall	North	African American	website, contributions of Africans And African Americans in the fields of history, art and culture
INFINITY Science Center		Hancock	Hancock	Southeast	Aerospace	Interactive space exhibits, tours of America's largest rocket engine test complex
Institute of Southern Jewish Life Natchez		Natchez	Adams	Southwest	Ethnic - Jewish	Guided tours of 1843 Temple B'nai Israel, formerly known as the Museum for Southern Jewish Life
Institute of Southern Jewish Life Utica		Utica	Hinds	Southwest	Ethnic - Jewish	Currently closed and relocating, features objects from disbanded congregations across the region
International Museum of Muslim Cultures		Jackson	Hinds	Southwest	Ethnic	website, Islamic history and culture, contributions of Muslims
Jackson Public Fire Safety Education Center and Fire Museum		Jackson	Hinds	Southwest	Firefighting	website, collection includes a 19th-century uniform; fire engines, pictures, communication equipment and records
Jacqueline House Museum		Vicksburg	Warren	Southwest	Ethnic (African American)	website, collection includes artifacts, art archives, photography and audio/visual materials, open by appointment
Jaketown Museum		Belzoni	Humphreys	Delta	Archaeology	Artifacts from the Jaketown Site
Jerry Clower Museum		Liberty	Amite	Southwest	Biographical	Mementos of humorist Jerry Clower, open by appointment
Jim Henson Delta Boyhood Exhibit		Leland	Washington	Delta	Biographical	website, Childhood of puppeteer Jim Henson, who grew up in Leland, and the creation of Kermit the Frog and the Muppets
Jimmie Rodgers Museum		Meridian	Lauderdale	East Central	Biographical	Memorabilia associated with Jimmie Rodgers (country singer), "The father of country music"
John Grisham Room		Starkville	Oktibbeha	East Central	Biographical	website, part of the Mitchell Memorial Library at MSU, exhibit and papers of author John Grisham
John Ford Home		Sandy Hook	Marion	Southeast	Historic house	Built about 1805, the oldest frontier style structure in the Pearl River Valley, operated by the Marion County Historical Society
Kate Freeman Clark Art Gallery		Holly Springs	Marshall	North	Art	website, works by local artist Kate Freeman Clark
Kate Lobrano House		Bay St. Louis	Hancock	Southeast	Historic house	website, operated by the Hancock County Historical Society, 1896 shotgun cottage with turn-of-the-century period rooms, photographs of Hancock County, ancient Indian artifacts
Kemper County Historical Museum		De Kalb	Kemper	East Central	Local history	
Key Brothers Aviation Exhibit		Meridian	Lauderdale	East Central	Aviation	Located in the Meridian Regional Airport, photo exhibit commemorates Meridian's Key brothers and area aviation history
Kosciusko Museum and Visitors Center		Kosciusko	Attala	East Central	Local history	
Kossuth Museum		Corinth	Alcorn	North	Local history	
Lake Hills Motor Bike Museum		Corinth	Alcorn	North	Transportation	Website, motorcycles
Landrum's Country Homestead and Village		Laurel	Jones	Southeast	Open-air	website, re-creation of a late 1800s settlement with over 50 buildings and displays on 10 acres (40,000 m^{2})
Lauren Rogers Museum of Art		Laurel	Jones	Southeast	Art	Collection includes 19th and 20th century American art, 19th century European art, English Georgian silver, Native American basketry and Japanese Ukiyo-e woodblock prints
Lawrence County Regional History Museum		Monticello	Lawrence	Southwest	Local history	Located on the bottom floor of the Civic Center
Lois Dowdle Cobb Museum of Archaeology		Starkville	Oktibbeha	East Central	Archaeology	Website, part of the Mississippi State University, artifacts from ancient Middle East and the Southeastern United States, Central and South America, Greece, Rome, and eastern Europe
Longwood		Natchez	Adams	Southwest	Historic house	Built 1860-61 (and never finished); a National Historic Landmark; largest octagonal house in North America, features Oriental-inspired architecture
Lower Mississippi River Museum		Vicksburg	Warren	Southwest	Maritime	Exhibits include steamboats and transportation, commerce, life along the river, floods, natural and military history
Lucille Parker Art Gallery		Hattiesburg	Forrest	Southeast	Art	Website, part of William Carey University
Lynn Meadows Discovery Center		Gulfport	Harrison	Southeast	Children's	website
Magnolia Hall		Natchez	Adams	Southwest	Historic house	Owned by the Natchez Garden Club, mid 19th-century mansion, features a collection of pilgrimage costumes, dolls
The Magnolias (Aberdeen, Mississippi)		Aberdeen	Monroe	North	Historic house	website, 1850s Greek Revival mansion
Manship House Museum		Jackson	Hinds	Southwest	Historic house	Restored antebellum middle-class home, operated by the Mississippi Department of Archives and History
Marie Hull Gallery		Raymond	Hinds	Southwest	Art	website, part of Hinds Community College, regional and local exhibitions in a variety of media
Marion County Museum		Columbia	Marion	Southeast	Local history	Operated by the Marion County Historical Society, pioneer and Native American artifacts, military memorabilia, historic photos
Maritime & Seafood Industry Museum		Biloxi	Harrison	Southeast	Industry (Maritime)	[maritimemuseum.org website], Displays include shrimping, oystering, recreational fishing, wetlands, managing marine resources, charter boats, marine blacksmithing, wooden boat building, netmaking, catboats/Biloxi skiff
Marshall County Historical Museum		Holly Springs	Marshall	North	Local history	website, includes antiques, dolls and doll houses, clothing, tools, household items
Martin & Sue King Railroad Heritage Museum		Cleveland	Bolivar	Delta	Railroad	website, includes railroad artifacts, model train layout
McComb Historic Railroad Museum		McComb	Pike	Southwest	Railway	Railroad artifacts, equipment, photos
McRaven House		Vicksburg	Warren	Southwest	Historic house	Plantation house with furnishings from three periods
Melrose		Natchez	Adams	Southwest	Historic house	Pre-Civil War estate, part of Natchez National Historical Park
Meridian Museum of Art		Meridian	Lauderdale	East Central	Art	
Meridian Railroad Museum		Meridian	Lauderdale	East Central	Railroad	Historic railroad cars
Merrehope		Meridian	Lauderdale	East Central	Historic house	20 room Victorian mansion
Military Memorial Museum		Brookhaven	Lincoln	Southwest	Military	
Mississippi Agriculture and Forestry Museum		Jackson	Hinds	Southwest	Multiple	website, open-air museum about the state agriculture and forestry industry, including farmers, loggers, sawmill workers, agricultural aviators, Mississippi 4-H Museum
Mississippi Armed Forces Museum		Hattiesburg	Forrest	Southeast	Military	Located at Camp Shelby
Mississippi Civil Rights Museum		Jackson	Hinds	Southwest	Civil rights	website
Mississippi Coast Model Railroad Museum		Gulfport	Harrison	Southeast	Model railroad	website
Mississippi Entomological Museum		Starkville	Oktibbeha	East Central	Natural history	website, part of the Mississippi State University, displays on insects and other entomological subjects in the foyer of the Clay Lyle Entomology Building
Mississippi Governor's Mansion		Jackson	Hinds	Southwest	Historic house	
Mississippi Industrial Heritage Museum		Meridian	Lauderdale	East Central	Technology	Located in the Soulé Steam Feed Works, steam engines
Mississippi John Hurt Museum		Carrollton	Carroll	Delta	Music (Blues)/Historic house	website, bluesman John Hurt's shanty home, open by appointment
Mississippi Museum of Art		Jackson	Hinds	Southwest	Art	Features over 4,000 works by Mississippi artists, includes paintings by American, Mississippi and British painters as well as photographs, collage artworks and sculptures
Mississippi Museum of Natural Science		Jackson	Hinds	Southwest	Natural history	Located in Lefleur's Bluff State Park
Mississippi Music Museum		Hazlehurst	Copiah	Southwest	Local history	Located in the historic depot, showcases all MS-born types of music including blues, country and rock'n'roll
Mississippi Musicians Hall of Fame		Jackson	Hinds	Southwest	Hall of fame (Music)	Located in the Jackson–Evers International Airport
Mississippi Petrified Forest		Flora	Madison	Southwest	Natural history	Grounds have a nature trail among petrified logs in addition to museum with petrified wood and fossils
Mississippi Sports Hall of Fame		Jackson	Hinds	Southwest	Hall of fame (Sports)	Features touch-screen kiosks, hands-on exhibits, collection of items, interviews, and film footage of state athletes, home of the Conerly Trophy
Mississippi State University Galleries		Starkville	Oktibbeha	East Central	Art	website, exhibits of art, architecture, design and decorative arts in several gallery locations
Mitchell Farms		Collins	Covington	Southeast	Agriculture	Restored farm buildings on a working farm; Website
Monmouth Plantation		Natchez	Adams	Southwest	Historic house	Tours of the restored early 19th-century plantation house, now an inn
Mount Locust Inn		Natchez	Adams	Southwest	Historic building	information, Mississippi's only remaining frontier inn, part of the Natchez Trace Parkway
Municipal Art Gallery of Jackson		Jackson	Hinds	Southwest	Art	website, contemporary art gallery
Museum of the Mississippi Delta		Greenwood	Leflore	Delta	Multiple	website, art, archaeology, agriculture, antiques and animals
Museum of Mississippi History		Jackson	Hinds	Southwest	Local history	15,000 years of state history, with thousands of historic artifacts
Natchez Museum of African Art and Heritage		Natchez	Adams	Southwest	Ethnic (African American)	Run by the Natchez Association for the Preservation of Afro-American Culture
Natchez National Historical Park		Natchez	Adams	Southwest	Historic house	Includes the William Johnson House, owned by a free African American barber, and the 19th century Melrose estate
Neshoba County-Philadelphia Historical Museum		Philadelphia	Neshoba	East Central	Local history	
North Delta Museum		Friars Point	Coahoma	Delta	Local history	Includes pioneer, Civil War and American Indian artifacts
Noxubee County Historical Society Museum		Macon	Noxubee	East Central	Local history	
Oakes African American Cultural Center		Yazoo City	Yazoo	Delta	Ethnic (African American)	
Oaks Museum		Jackson	Hinds	Southwest	Historic house	Mid 19th century period house
Ohr-O'Keefe Museum Of Art		Biloxi	Harrison	Southeast	Art	Features pottery of George Ohr, dedicated to the ceramics of George E. Ohr
Oktibbeha County Heritage Museum		Starkville	Oktibbeha	East Central	Local history	website
Old Depot Museum (Vicksburg)		Vicksburg	Warren	Southwest	Multiple	website, also known as Vicksburg Battlefield Museum, models and a film about the Battle of Vicksburg, HO, N, and O scale model train layouts, river and military boat model, miniature cars,
Old Capitol Museum		Jackson	Hinds	Southwest	History	Former state capitol building
Old Court House Museum		Vicksburg	Warren	Southwest	Local history	Built about 1858, local history museum with antiques, Civil War artifacts, decorative arts, local memorabilia
Old Courthouse Museum, Iuka		Iuka	Tishomingo	Northeast	Local and County History	Old Tishomingo County Courthouse. Built 1870. Battle of Iuka and role as marriage capital of the South are emphasized. Genealogy Library. Civil War Artifacts and post Civil War artifacts. Documents, photographs and library.
Old Firehouse Museum		Wiggins	Stone	Southeast	Local history	website Located on former site of City firehouse
Old Number One Firehouse Museum		Greenville	Washington	Delta	Firefighting	Former cotton-factoring office (built about 1923) converted into a firehouse in 1931; old equipment, hands-on displays, children's dress-up area
Oren Dunn City Museum		Tupelo	Lee	North	Open-air	Includes local history museum, Tupelo Veterans Museum, 1870s dogtrot cabin, church and school, two fire trucks, 1948 Lee County Book Mobile, Memphis trolley car turned local eatery Dudie's Diner, and Frisco Caboose
Pearl River Community College Museum		Poplarville	Pearl River	Southeast	Local history	website, college history, Native American artifacts
Pemberton's Headquarters		Vicksburg	Warren	Southwest	Historic house	Part of Vicksburg National Military Park, headquarters for Confederate General John C. Pemberton during most of the 47-day siege of Vicksburg
Pleasant Reed House		Biloxi	Harrison	Southeast	African American	Operated by appointment with the Ohr-O'Keefe Museum Of Art, exhibits on area African-American history
Rankin County Historical Museum		Brandon	Rankin	Southwest	Local history	website, operated by the Rankin County Historical Society, includes a store, house and post office
Robert Johnson Blues Museum		Crystal Springs	Copiah	Southwest	Music (Blues)	website, blues and local history
Rock & Blues Museum		Clarksdale	Coahoma	Delta	Music (Blues, Rock 'n' Roll)	Website, music memorabilia from the 1920s through the 1970s
Rosalie		Natchez	Adams	Southwest	Historic house	Built about 1820, National Historic Landmark Federal-style house
Rosemont Plantation		Woodville	Wilkinson	Southwest	Historic house	Family home of Jefferson Davis
Rowan Oak		Oxford	Lafayette	North	Historic house	Home of author William Faulkner
Sam B. Olden Yazoo Historic Museum		Yazoo City	Yazoo	Delta	Local history	Located in the Triangle Cultural Center
Sam Wilhite Transportation Museum		West Point	Clay	East Central	Transportation	website, area transportation history, includes model railroad display
Scranton Museum		Pascagoula	Jackson	Southeast	Maritime	website, 70 foot shrimp boat including a wheelhouse, galley, shrimping TED, net display, bunkroom, wetlands diorama, and three aquariums
Scranton Nature Center		Pascagoula	Jackson	Southeast	Natural history	website
Seabee Heritage Center		Gulfport	Harrison	Southeast	Military/Maritime	Website, history of the Seabees, located in the Naval Construction Battalion Center
Smith Robertson Museum		Jackson	Hinds	Southwest	Ethnic (African American)	website, site of Jackson's first school for African-Americans, displays history and achievements of African-American Mississippians
Stanton Hall		Natchez	Adams	Southwest	Historic house	1857 mansion with Natchez antiques and many original furnishings
Stephen D. Lee Home and Museum		Columbus	Lowndes	East Central	Historic house	Mid 19th-century house, includes Florence McLeod Hazard Museum with Civil War collections and local history artifacts
Strawberry Plains Audubon Center		Holly Springs	Marshall	North	Multiple	website, nature center and historic antebellum Davis House open for tours
Tishomingo County Archives and History Museum		Iuka	Tishomingo	North	Local history	Website, operated by the Tishomingo County Historical & Genealogical Society
Tunica Museum		Tunica	Tunica	Delta	Local history	Includes area natural history, Tunica people, social history, agriculture, casinos
Tunica RiverPark		Tunica Resorts	Tunica	Delta	Multiple	website, includes the Mississippi River Museum about the natural, cultural and maritime history of the Mississippi River, aquariums, observation platform, nature trail and river cruise
Tupelo Automobile Museum		Tupelo	Lee	North	Automotive	Over 100 antique, classic and collectible automobiles
Ulysses S. Grant Presidential Library and Museum		Starkville	Oktibbeha	East Central	History	website, part of the Mitchell Memorial Library at MSU, exhibits on the Civil war, especially in Mississippi, and Ulysses S. Grant
Union County Heritage Museum		New Albany	Union	North	Multiple	website, complex includes local history museum with changing exhibits of art and culture, a caboose, country store, jail cell, doctor's office, blacksmith shop and barn
University of Mississippi Museum		Oxford	Lafayette	North	Multiple	Includes fine art, Greek & Roman antiquities, folk art, scientific instruments
USM Museum of Art		Hattiesburg	Forrest	Southeast	Art	Website, part of University of Southern Mississippi
USS Cairo Museum		Vicksburg	Warren	Southwest	Ship museum	Restored Union ironclad gunboat raised after a century, contains artifacts found on board, part of Vicksburg National Military Park
Uzebek Museum		Brookhaven	Lincoln	Southwest	Ethnic	Open by appointment, culture of Uzbekistan
Verandah-Curlee House		Corinth	Alcorn	North	Historic house	1857 Greek Revival mansion, tours by appointment
Veterans Memorial Museum		Laurel	Jones	Southeast	Military	Includes books, newspapers, and documents from all war eras and over 100 movies and documentaries
Vicksburg National Military Park		Vicksburg	Warren	Southwest	Military	Includes visitor center with exhibits, 1,330 monuments and markers, a 16-mile tour road, a restored Union gunboat, and a National Cemetery
Walter Anderson Museum of Art		Ocean Springs	Jackson	Southeast	Art	Works of Walter Inglis Anderson, adjoins the community center where Anderson painted in the 1950s
Waveland Ground Zero Hurricane Museum		Waveland	Hancock	Southeast	Hurricane Katrina artifacts	Contains educational exhibits on hurricanes and Mississippi Gulf Coast culture. Housed in NRHP Waveland Elementary School.
West End Hose Company No. 3 Museum & Fire Education Center		Biloxi	Harrison	Southeast	Firefighting	website, historic firefighting tools and equipment, educational fire prevention center for children
Wilkinson County Museum		Woodville	Wilkinson	Southwest	Local history	website, website, includes exhibits on Lester Young, William Grant Still, Anne Moddy and Scott Dunbar, and local folk art
Winterville Mounds and Museum		Greenville	Washington	Delta	Archaeology - Native American	One of the largest Indian mound groups in the Mississippi Valley
Wright Art Center		Cleveland	Bolivar	Delta	Art	website, part of Delta State University, contains two galleries for contemporary art exhibitions and the permanent collection of the University Art Department
WROX Museum		Clarksdale	Coahoma	Delta	Media	website, history and equipment from the historic WROX-AM radio station, open by appointment
Yellow Fever Martyrs Church Museum		Holly Springs	Marshall	North	History - Medical	Open by appointment, about the yellow fever epidemic of 1878
Yesterday's Children Antique Doll and Toy Museum		Vicksburg	Warren	Southwest	Toy	website, dolls and toys of the 19th and 20th century

== Defunct museums ==
- Graceland Too, Holly Springs, closed in 2014
- International Checker Hall of Fame, Petal, destroyed by fire on September 29, 2007
- StenniSphere, closed in 2012, exhibits now in the INFINITY Science Center
- Walter Place Estate, Holly Springs, no longer a museum

== Regions ==
The "Region" column of this list follows the regional divisions of the Mississippi Convention and Visitors Bureau, which breaks the state into these five areas (generic names here replace all but one of the bureau's names, which may have been designed for advertising purposes):

- Delta ("Delta"): Bolivar, Carroll, Coahoma, Grenada, Holmes, Humphries, Issaqueena, Leflore, Montgomery, Quitman, Sharkey, Sunflower, Tallahachie, Tunica, Washington.
- East central ("Pines"): Attala, Clarke, Clay, Choctaw, Lauderdale, Leake, Lowndes, Neshoba, Newton, Oktibbeha, Kemper, Scott, Smith, Jasper, Webster
- North ("Hills"): Alcorn, Benton, Calhoun, Chicksaw, DeSoto, Ittawamba, Lafayette, Lee, Marshall, Monroe, Panola, Pontotoc, Prentiss, Tate, Tippah, Tishomingo, Union, Yalobusha.
- Southeast ("Coastal"): Covington, Forrest, George, Greene, Marion, Hancock, Harrison, Jackson, Jefferson Davis, Jones, Lamar, Pearl River, Perry, Stone, Wayne
- Southwest ("Capital/River"): Adams, Amite, Claiborne, Copah, Franklin, Jefferson, Lawrence, Lincoln, Madison, Pike, Rankin, Simpson, Walthall, Warren, Wilkinson, Yazoo

== See also ==
- Botanical gardens in Mississippi (category)
- List of historical societies in Mississippi
- Nature Centers in Mississippi
