= Scott Dunbar =

American blues musician

- Born: June 6, 1904; Lake Mary, Wilkinson County, Mississippi
- Died: October 1, 1994 (aged 90) Centreville, Mississippi
- Genres: Blues; Delta blues
- Occupations: Musician; songwriter
- Instruments: Vocals; guitar
- Label: Fat Possum Records

Scott Dunbar (June 6, 1904 – October 1, 1994) was a blues musician from Mississippi, U.S., who became known and critically appreciated later in life.

== Early life ==
Dunbar was born on June 6, 1904, ostensibly the son of a former slave, in the Deer Park community, once a plantation, situated between the Mississippi River and the oxbow Lake Mary, west of Woodville and south of Natchez, in Mississippi, US. He did not go to school and was musically mostly self-taught. At the age of eight, as he later related, he made a guitar out of a "cigar box and a broomstick and some stream wire." His first "real" guitar he was gifted some two years later and, after some time, he was invited, according to his recollection, to play in a house band, led by a fiddle player.

== Career ==
Dunbar never had an illustrious career, leading a quiet life around his hometown. By all accounts, he never sought fortune nor fame; he lived a contented existence as a fisherman and river guide. His music was first recorded by researcher Frederic Ramsey, Jr. in 1954. (Note: Ramsey's music recordings were published in the 10-volume Folkways series Music from the South. The series' Vol.5, Song, Play And Dance, released in 1956, included four recordings of Dunbar’s music. See Sunday Blues (2008). Vol. 10, Been Here and Gone, issued in 1960, featured Dunbar's simply titled "Blues." See Folkways catalog.)

In 1970, the New Orleans-based label Ahura Mazda, released an album with Scott Dunbar tracks, titled From Lake Mary. The record was noticed mostly by blues collectors aficionados and "across the pond" aficionados, especially in Britain. Yet, Dunbar was never moved to cash in on his small brush with popularity. In his liner notes to the Folkways series, Frederic Ramsey Jr. wrote that "Scott Dunbar [still] lives in a cabin anchored by wires to nearby trees. At night, when the small fleet of outboard motors is tied up at lake's edge, Scott pulls out his guitar and 'touches it up.'Working his way into a tune, Scot hums it along with the strings that begin to move under his fingers. His foot, pounding the caked mud, keeps time; the dry dirt comes up in clouds of dust, and soon the cake is patted smooth." Away from strangers, Dunbar would launch into songs about outlaws roaming the levee backwaters, escaped convicts, (Note: Only a winding stretch of the Mississippi River and its surrounding backwaters and levees separates Dunbar's home and the Louisiana State Penitentiary, colloquially known as the Angola Prison.) and wanderers, all long dead. Folklorist William Morris, who recorded Dunbar, (Note: William Ferris's Mississippi field-recordings were released by the Dust-to-Digital label as a multi-media box set titled Voices of Mississippi: Artists and Musicians Documented by William Ferris in 2018.) wrote that "in addition to being a songster who composed and sang a wide range of blues, [Dunbar] was a gifted storyteller whose tales vividly described the worlds of black religion, white fishermen, and the military at Camp Shelby, Mississippi."

== Death ==
Dunbar died on October 1, 1994, leaving his wife, Celeste, and their two daughters.

== Legacy ==
Dunbar was praised by Jeff Harris in Sunday Blues as a musician of "extraordinary and utterly singular ability." Harris wrote that his guitar playing deployed a "strong drive" and cascading rhythm changes in the lower notes, while he vocalized over the higher ones with a technique that combined yodeling and scat singing. He came to develop a "highly individual style", which was removed from other blues currents while still being traditional.

Dunbar's "primitive" acoustic music was taken up as being "hip" around the late 1990s and his output was liberally sampled, as were, during that period, other blues artists' tracks, most notably by Moby.

== Selected discography ==
- From Lake Mary album, 1970. Tracks:

Side 1	Side 2
Who Been Foolin' You	That's Alright Mama
Little Liza Jane	Easy Rider
Memphis Mail	Richard Daley Blues
Vicksburg Blues	Sweet Mama Rollin' Stone
Forty-Four Blues	Blue Yodel
	Goodnight Irene
