= Lake Mary =

Lake Mary or Mary Lake may refer to:

== Australia ==
- Lake Mary, Queensland, a locality in the Shire of Livingstone

== Canada ==
- Marylake Augustinian Monastery, the property, monastery and retreat centre in King City, Ontario, Canada
- Mary Lake (Ontario), a small lake in Muskoka, Ontario

== United States ==
=== Populated places ===
- Lake Mary, California, an unincorporated community
- Lake Mary, Florida, a city in Seminole County, Florida
- Lake Mary Township, Douglas County, Minnesota

=== Lakes ===
- Lake Mary (Arizona), a reservoir south east of Flagstaff
- Lake Mary (California), a lake near Lake Mary, California in Mono County
- Mary Lake (California), a lake in Redding, California
- Mary Lake (Clearwater and Hubbard counties, Minnesota)
- Lake Mary (Crow Wing County, Minnesota)
- Lake Mary (Douglas County, Minnesota)
- Lake Mary (Wisconsin), see Meromictic lake
- Mary Lake, a lake in Le Sueur County, Minnesota
- Lake Mary, a lake in McLeod County, Minnesota
- Mary Lake, a lake in Watonwan County, Minnesota
- Lake Mary (South Dakota)

== See also ==
- Llyn Mair, the Welsh name for Mary's Lake, an artificial lake in North Wales
