= Merrehope =

Historic house in Mississippi, United States

- U.S. National Register of Historic Places
- Mississippi Landmark
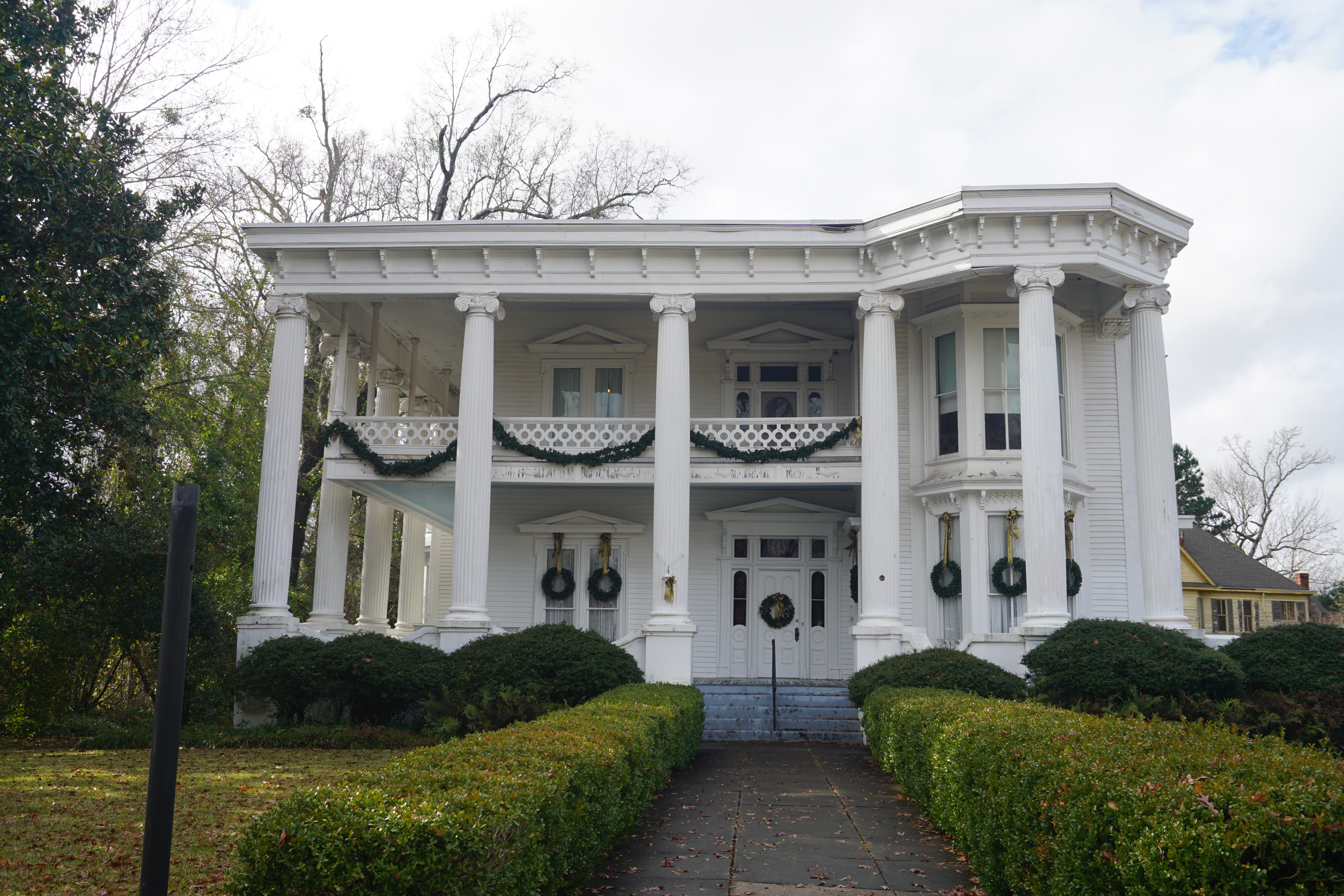
- Merrehope in 2018

- Location within Mississippi Location within the United States
- Interactive map showing the location of Merrehope
- Location: 905 31st Ave., Meridian, Mississippi
- Coordinates: 32°22′1″N 88°43′35″W
- Built: 1859
- Architect: Juriah Jackson; S.H. Floyd
- Architectural style: Academic Revivalism
- NRHP reference No.: 71000455
- USMS No.: 075-MER-1849-NR-MRA-ML

Significant dates
- Added to NRHP: December 9, 1971
- Designated USMS: June 14, 1995

Merrehope, a 26-room Victorian mansion that currently serves as a historic house museum, was originally built in 1858 by Richard McLemore for his daughter Juriah Jackson. After changing ownership several times, with small alterations from each owner, the house was eventually bought by S.H. Floyd in 1904, who remodelled it into its present appearance. The building was one of few spared by General William Tecumseh Sherman on his raid of the city in the Battle of Meridian, and has served many functions throughout its history, including time as a residence, a shelter for Union officers, a Confederate General's headquarters, an apartment building, and a boarding house. The building was listed on the National Register of Historic Places in 1971 and as a Mississippi Landmark in 1995.

== History ==
Richard McLemore, one of the first settlers of Meridian, deeded the land on which Merrehope now stands to his daughter, Juriah Jackson, in 1858. Juriah and her husband, W. H. Jackson, constructed a small building which was later remodelled extensively into its present state. The house changed hands in 1863 to a General Joseph E. Johnson, who made some architectural alterations to the original building. The building was used as headquarters for Confederate General Leonidas Polk during the American Civil War and as a shelter for several of Union General William T. Sherman's officers when they attacked the city in the Battle of Meridian. The house is one of only six homes in Meridian that remained standing after Sherman's raid.

After the war, John H. and Eliza Gary resided in the house before selling it to J. C. Lloyd in 1881. The Garys had built the main block of the house, to which was attached the ell that was the original structure. The house took on its current appearance when it was purchased in 1904 by S. H. Floyd, who remodelled the house in the Academic Revival style. The ell was detached and moved back about 20 feet (6.1 m), and a second story containing two servants' rooms, bathrooms, and a hallway was added. On the first floor of the main block, a dining room, stairhall, bathroom, and guest room were added to the rear of the building while the two rooms on the north side of the hall were transformed into double parlors. The rooms on the south side of the hall were converted into a library. Upstairs, a bedroom suite was constructed on either side of the new hallway, and over the rear addition were two bedrooms, a bathroom, and another stairhall.

A giant portico was added to the east and south sides of the building, and the two-story Ionic columns were placed atop six-foot plinths connected by a wall which ran the length of the porticos. Three more plinths were added to the north side of the building without columns, and a fourth plinth supports a one-story column under the second story of the ell. This column is all that remains of a former porte-cochère. When the portico was added, the original front porch was removed, but the balcony remained, supported by smaller columns attached to the ceiling of the new portico.

The home was eventually divided into eight apartments in the 1930s, after which the building served as a boarding house until the 1960s. The building was purchased by the Meridian Restorations Foundation in 1968 and named Merrehope, a portmanteau for the combination of "Meridian Restorations" and "hope," reflecting the desire of the club to restore the building after decades of neglect. The foundation convinced the Mississippi Legislature to pass a special act allowing the city of Meridian to assist the group financially with the restoration.

The house was listed on the National Register of Historic Places in 1971 while it was still being restored, and as a Mississippi Landmark in 1995.

== Hauntings ==
After the restoration of the home, many people claimed to have seen ghosts in the building. John Gary, one of the owners of the house who added most of the rooms present today, had a daughter named Eugenia. Eugenia died of underage consumption as a teenager, never having lived in the building itself. John Gary, who lived in the house for many years, had his funeral service there. Many people have claimed to see Eugenia wandering the halls of the building. The first reported sighting was made by a former hostess who recognized the apparition from a painting in the museum room. Since then, several people have claimed to see or hear the spirit.

Eugenia is one of two ghosts believed to be residing in the building; the other haunts the Periwinkle room. Donna White, Merrehope's current hostess, claims that she was walking into the room when she recognized an imprint of a body on the bed. She ran downstairs and checked the house for intruders but found no one. The ghost also reportedly makes loud crashes and bangs from the room, yet nothing is found broken when the room is inspected.
