= Tunica Museum =

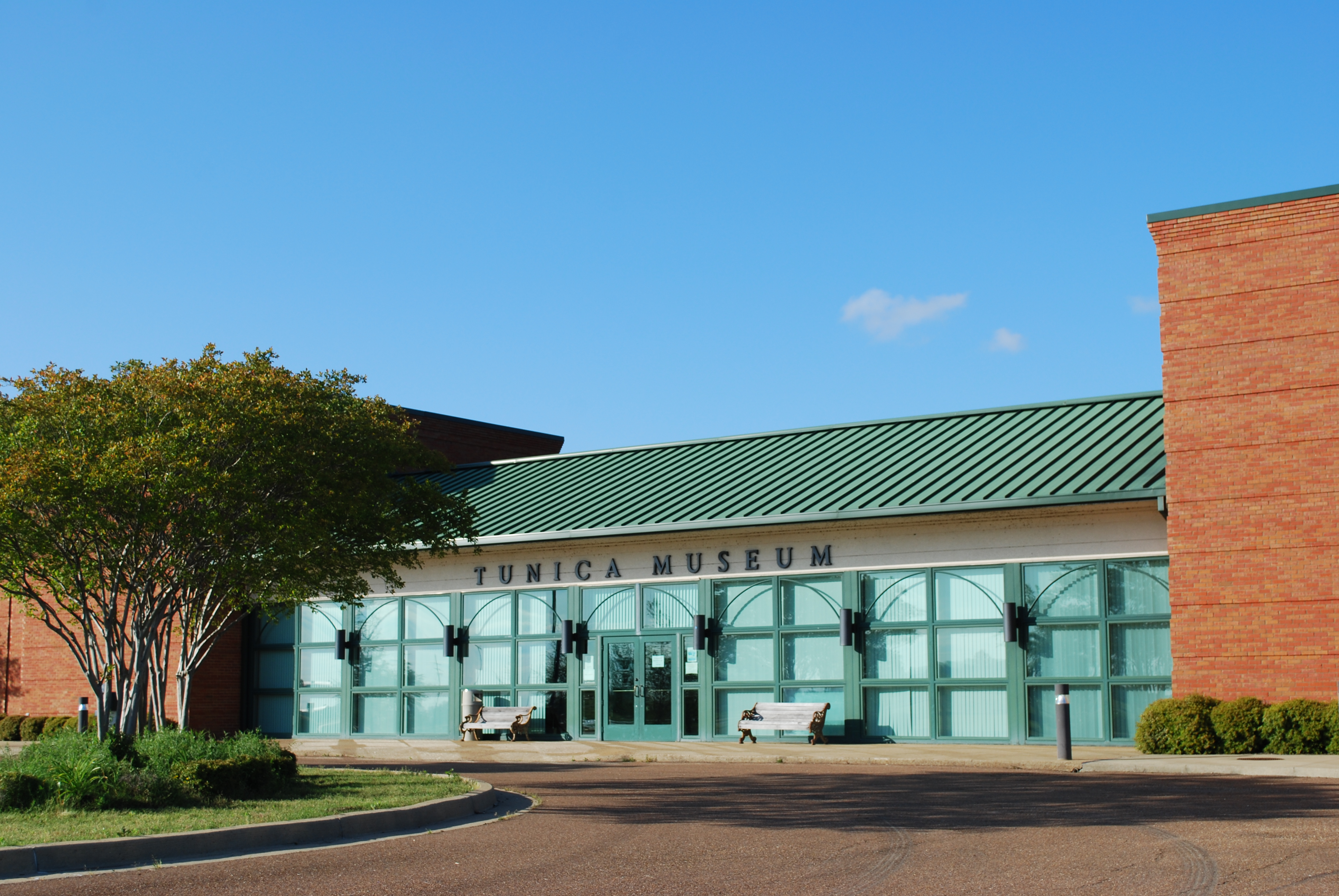
- Established: 1997
- Location: 1 Museum Blvd; Tunica, Mississippi
- Coordinates: 34.7279°N 90.3680°W
- Type: History museum

The Tunica Museum is a museum in Tunica, Mississippi dedicated to the history of Tunica County. Founded in 1997 and funded by casino gambling revenues, it has 6,500 square feet (600 m^{2}) of permanent exhibit space and 1,600 square feet (150 m^{2}) of temporary exhibit space, which showcase historically aspects of the region including race relations, Native American settlements, and the daily life of residents. It offers self-guided tours and is free to enter.

== Founding ==
The museum was proposed in 1997, by a group of citizens. They developed the museum's mission statement which states, "The Tunica County Museum will interpret the history of Tunica County through exhibits, education programs, research and collections. Topics include the natural setting, Native American prehistory, early European exploration and settlement, and 19th and 20th century social, agricultural, institutional, political, military and commercial history. The exhibits will reflect the rich ethnic diversity of the County." Funding for the project came from increased public revenues derived from casino gambling in Tunica County.

== Permanent exhibits ==
The first exhibits trace the history of Tunica County. The first room looks like a forest and has several examples of wildlife indigenous to the area. These include birds, bobcats, and a lifesize black bear. An exhibit of the mound building Indians, including the Tunica people, is next. There are panels that describe the life and activities of the Indians, and there is also a television that plays continually a short documentary about the Indians. One particular excavation site, the Hollywood site, is given special attention, including mention of the work done by the University of Mississippi's archaeology department.

Tunica was changed by European contact, and the museum describes the early exploration by the Spanish. The exhibit argues that Tunica County was the probable place where Hernando de Soto first sighted the Mississippi River. This is based on the descriptions of the place as described by members of DeSoto's party. This topic has been a source of debate for many years.7 There is a life-size conquistador, demonstrating the typical appearance of the early Spanish explorers.

Northern Mississippi, including Tunica County, belonged to the Chickasaw tribe through the colonial days and the first years of the new American republic. An exhibit details the Chickasaw cession (Treaty of 1818) made final with the Treaty of Pontotoc. With this cession's description, the exhibits move into the settlement of the region under the government of the State of Mississippi. Exhibits describe how the Tunica County was denuded and turned into farm land, including several large plantations. The land was excellent for farming. As part of the Mississippi Delta, the soil had been enriched by constant flooding of the Mississippi River. This section includes a full size mule and wagon, a real plantation bell, and a recreated plantation commissary. There are also several display related to the widespread use of slavery in Tunica.

Post-Civil War exhibits begin with the implementation of Jim Crow laws in Tunica. Stories of white violence during and post-Reconstruction are told, with special attention to a racist group known as the Red Shirts (Southern United States). Issues related to agriculture are examined, including the fight against the boll weevil, the Great Mississippi Flood of 1927, and the loss of field hands due to the Great Migration.

Daily life in Tunica up to modern times was shown with displays that included parts of a barbershop and movie theater. Tunica County has faced the persistence of poverty. A display recounts the national attention received from living conditions in Sugar Ditch, a poverty-stricken neighborhood in the city limits of Tunica. The Reverend Jesse Jackson's activities related to Sugar Ditch are part of the display.

In 1992, casino gambling came to Tunica County, when Splash Casino opened. The impact on Tunica County is the subject of another display that includes a slot machine and a casino card table. This section includes a television playing a short documentary related to casinos.

With the conclusion of the historical exhibits, there are several other displays. These include a cotton bale and samples of rice, soybeans, and corn directly from the farm fields. One board shows notable people from Tunica County, along with a description of what they did. The last part of the Tunica museum includes numerous stuffed animals found in Tunica, especially large birds.

== Themes ==
- The issue of race. From slavery to segregation to current racial issues, the reality of racial tension is explored by the museum.
- The importance of the land and climate. Tunica's economic activities have been ties to agriculture and the farming of the southern United States.
- The daily lives of Tunica County residents.

== Other exhibits and activities ==
The Museum also operates the Tate Log House, which is the oldest structure in the county. It is open for viewing and is located within downtown Tunica. It demonstrates the early living conditions within the county.

Behind the Museum, there is a nature walking trail, open to all visitors.

The museum holds special educational events and hosts special exhibits. In 2013, these included a display of plaster masks of blues musicians and about Abraham Lincoln, the Constitution, and the Civil War.

Tunica Museum is a member of the Mississippi Museums Association. This association seeks to expand and promote the work of museums throughout the state.
