= Lake Mary (Crow Wing County, Minnesota) =

Lake in the state of Minnesota, United States

- Location within Minnesota
- Location: Crow Wing County, Minnesota
- Coordinates: 46°44′22″N 93°54′57″W
- Type: lake

Lake Mary is a lake in Crow Wing County, in the U.S. state of Minnesota.

According to Warren Upham, Lake Mary was probably named of the daughter or wife of a pioneer lumberman.

== See also ==
- List of lakes in Minnesota
