= George E. Ohr =

American artist (1857–1918)

George Edgar Ohr
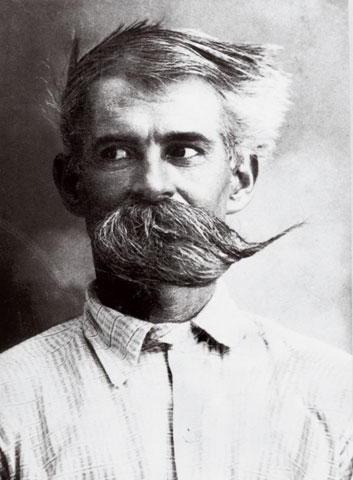
- The "Mad Potter of Biloxi"
- Born: July 12, 1857; Biloxi, Mississippi, US
- Died: April 7, 1918 (aged 60); New Orleans, Louisiana, US
- Known for: Pottery
- Style: Abstract expressionism
- Spouse: Josephine Gehring
- Memorials: Ohr-O'Keefe Museum Of Art

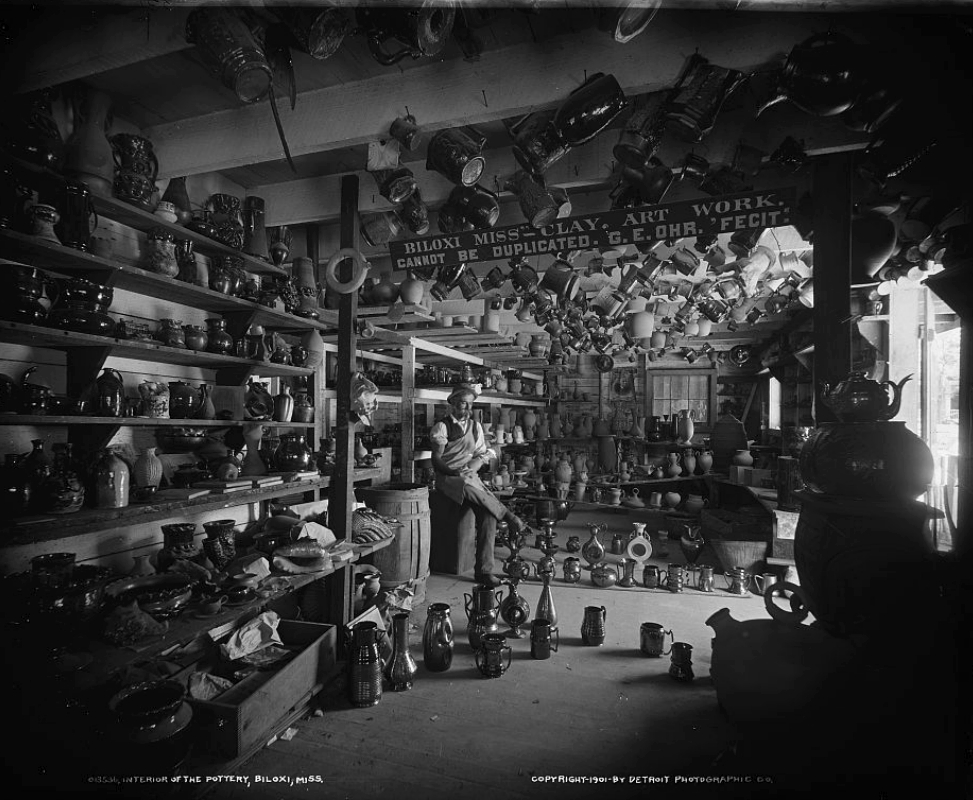
Interior of Ohr's rebuilt workshop, 1901

George Edgar Ohr (July 12, 1857 – April 7, 1918) was an American ceramic artist and the self-proclaimed "Mad Potter of Biloxi" in Mississippi. In recognition of his innovative experimentation with modern clay forms from 1880 to 1910, some consider him a precursor to the American Abstract-Expressionism movement.

== Biography ==
=== Early life ===
George Ohr was born in Biloxi, Mississippi, on July 12, 1857. Ohr's parents were German immigrants who had arrived in New Orleans around 1850, his father had established the first blacksmith shop in Biloxi and his mother ran an early, popular grocery store there.

=== Early career ===
George Ohr tried his hand at various trades before he became interested in ceramics in 1879, while an apprentice of Joseph Fortune Meyer, a potter whose family hailed from Alsace-Lorraine like Ohr's own.

In his lifetime, Ohr claimed to have made over 20,000 ceramic pieces. He called his work "unequaled, undisputed, unrivaled." In 1884, Ohr exhibited and sold his pottery at the World's Industrial and Cotton Centennial Exposition in New Orleans. Of the hundreds of pieces he showed, Ohr boasted he showed "no two alike." Ohr married Josephine Gehring of New Orleans on September 15, 1886. Ten children were born to the Ohrs, but only 6 survived to adulthood.

=== Post-fire career ===
In 1894 a fire burned much of Biloxi, including Ohr's workshop. With most of his previous work destroyed, Ohr began anew and many historians consider this a turning point in his life and career, with his following work showing tremendous energy and fluidity. George Ohr called his pots "mud babies". Upon the destruction of his workshop and his work, he gathered the pieces that survived the fire, and although burned, he kept each piece, calling them his "burned babies".

For much of his lifetime Ohr was most widely known for his eccentric self-promotion. He operated his studio as a regional attraction, calling it his "Pot-Ohr-E," and his main customers were curious tourists drawn in by his "odd-looking" workshop and numerous signs.

His achieved some degree of notoriety, but mixed success. In 1904 he traveled to the St. Louis World's Fair with hundreds of pieces to sell, but although people stopped to look at his pottery he wound up selling nothing. Ohr died of throat cancer on April 7, 1918.

== Legacy ==
=== Work ===
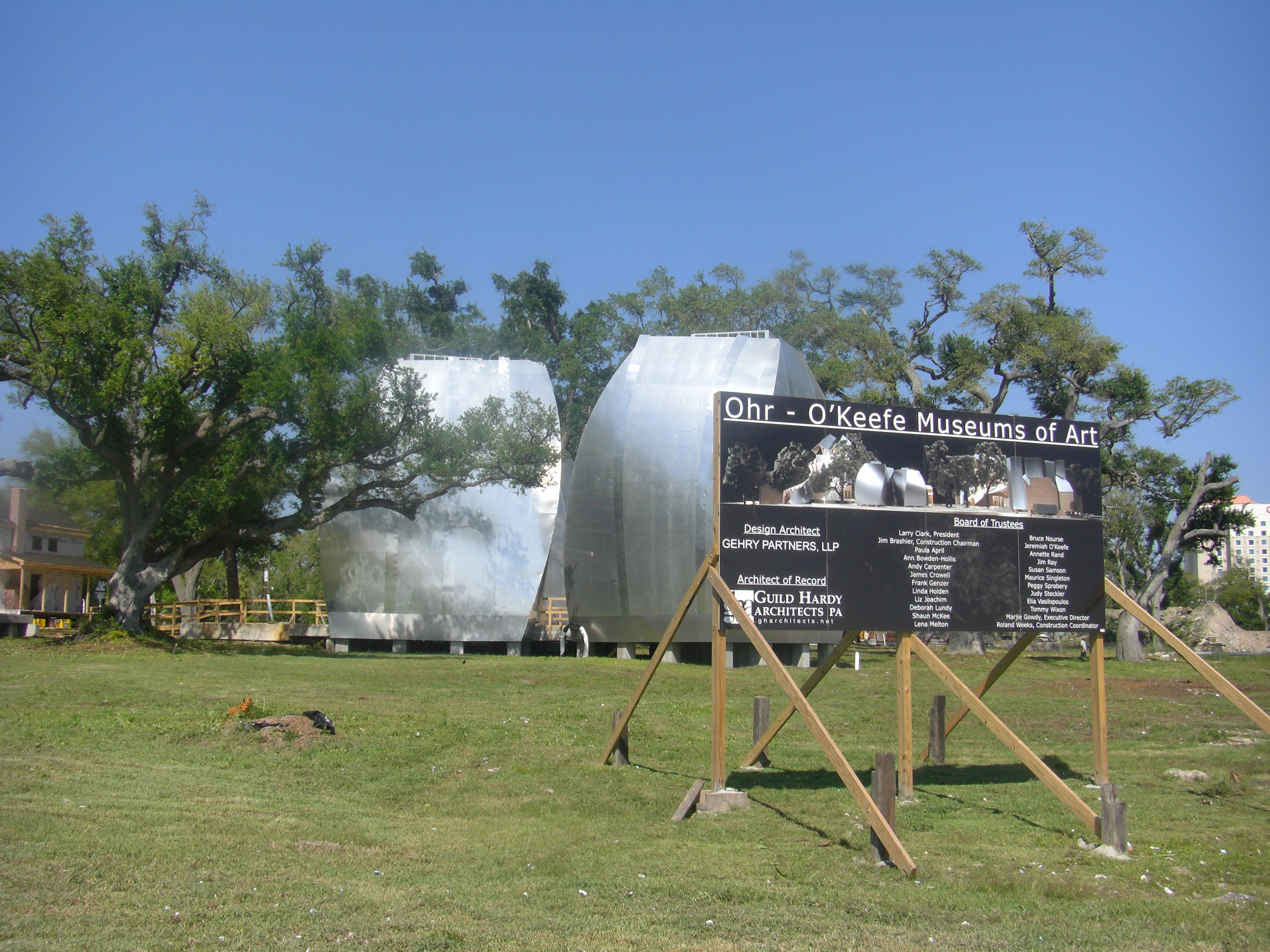
Ohr-O'Keefe Museum's "Pods" by Frank Gehry

For decades after Ohr's death, his remaining pieces sat in a garage behind his sons' gas station in Biloxi. In 1970 Jim Carpenter, an antiques dealer and barber from New Jersey, was visiting the area, saw the collection, and bought most of the pieces held by the Ohr family. In the following years Ohr's work attracted a resurgence of attention.

Ohr's work is now seen as ground-breaking and a harbinger of the abstract sculpture and pottery that developed in the mid-20th century, his pieces are now relatively rare and highly coveted.

=== Ohr-O'Keefe Museum of Art ===
The Ohr-O'Keefe Museum Of Art in Biloxi has a large permanent collection of Ohr's work. Three buildings of the new campus designed by Frank Gehry opened to the public on November 8, 2010, with several exhibitions, including a large selection of work by George Ohr. In addition to the Gehry-designed buildings, the Pleasant Reed Interpretive Center is also open to the public. The museum campus was almost partially destroyed during Hurricane Katrina when a casino barge was washed onto a nearby estate.

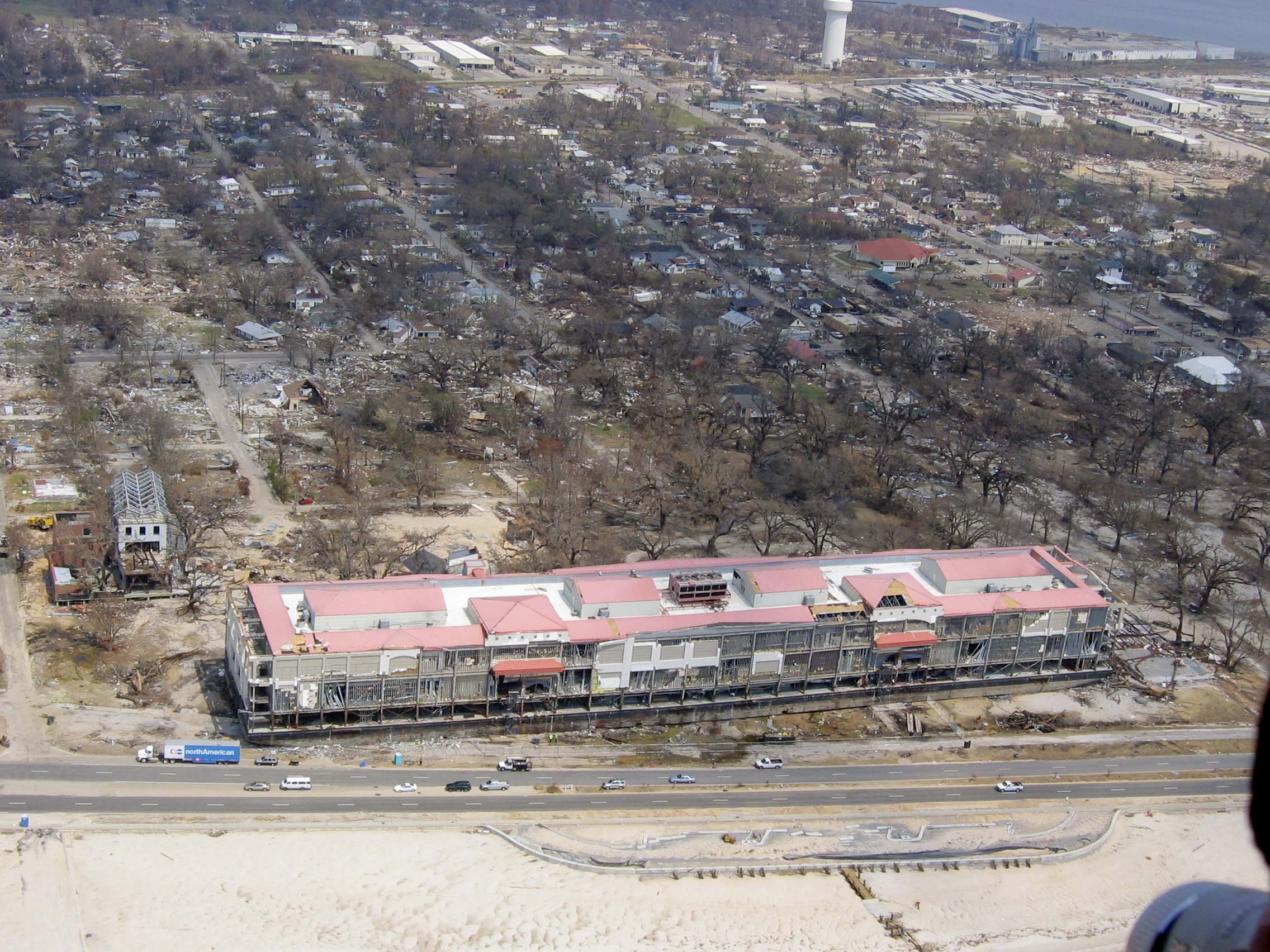
Casino barge washed onto the Ohr-O'Keefe Museum in September 2005

The American Museum of Ceramic Art in Pomona, California, hosted Ohr Rising: The Emergence of an American Master, a major national exhibition of Ohr pottery, from December 8, 2007–February 23, 2008. From 2008 to 2010, the exhibit traveled to San Angelo, Texas; Alfred, New York; Toronto, Canada; and the Louisiana State University Museum of Art in Baton Rouge, Louisiana. Many of those pieces, as well as several that have never been displayed, can now be seen at the Ohr-O'Keefe Museum of Art.

== Style ==
Ohr's pottery is notable for its thin walls, vibrant glazes, and twisted, pinched shapes made using a potter's wheel. Ohr dug much of his clay locally in southern Mississippi from the Tchoutacabouffa River. Tchoutacabouffa is the Biloxi tribe's word for "broken pot."

He called himself the "Mad Potter of Biloxi", groomed himself eccentrically, and inscribed this bawdy poem on the side of one of his pots: "Molly and I were on the beach engaged in nature's folly, The sand was hot upon my back but the sun was hot to Molly."

A 1905 review of his work by Ethel Hutson was mixed, critiquing his style as crude but praising him as the only widely-known potter of the time who produced art pottery on a wheel with a unique and distinct style. Hutson wrote "his bits of pottery are simply bizarre...unlovely as they are, they appeal more strongly to the person who is genuinely interested in the art of pottery, than all the smooth shapes...which the so-called "art-potteries" turn out by the million...Outside of Mr. Ohr's pottery, I can name none where the aim is to make each piece the work of an individual from beginning to end."

== Gallery ==
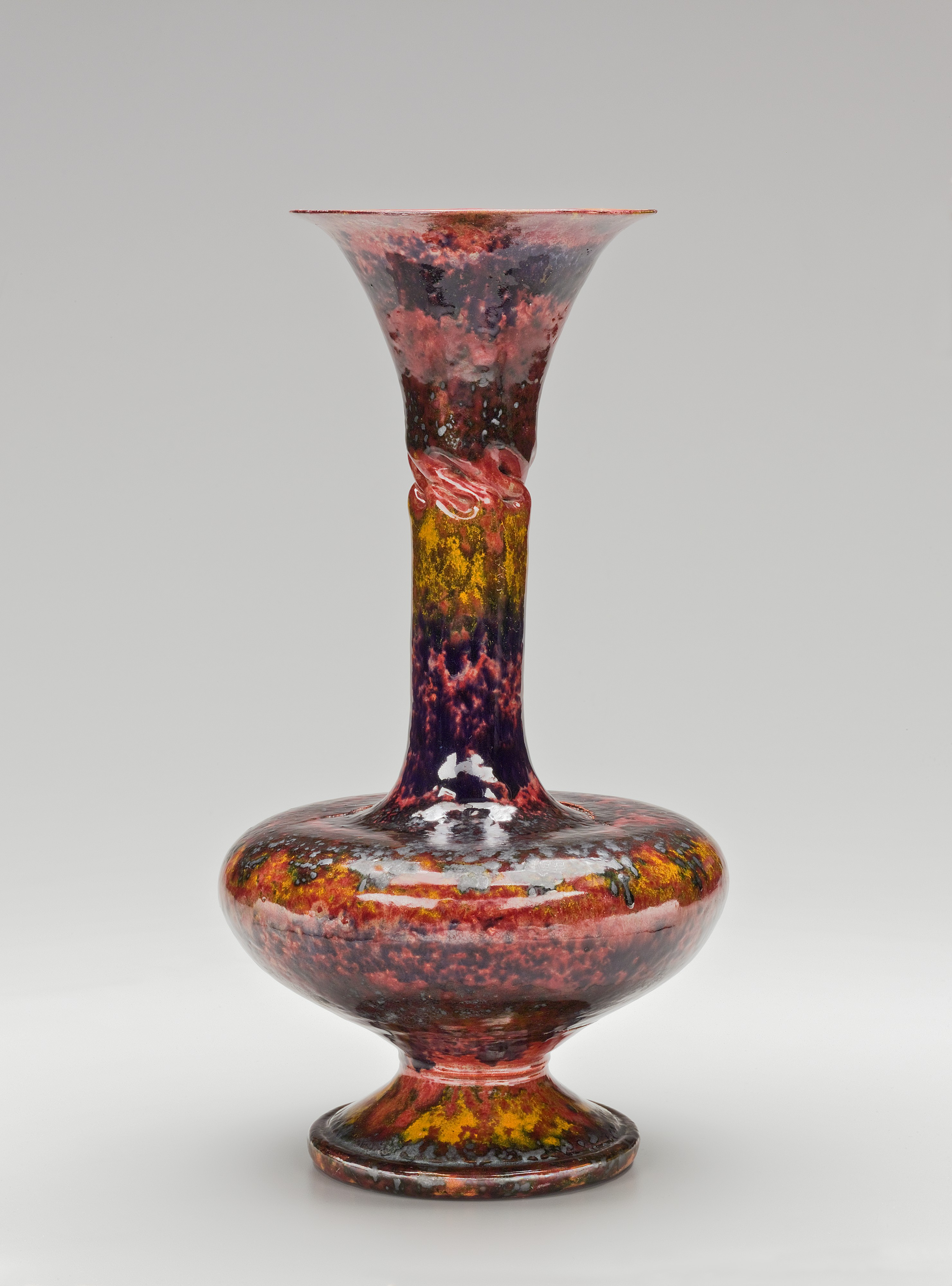
Vase

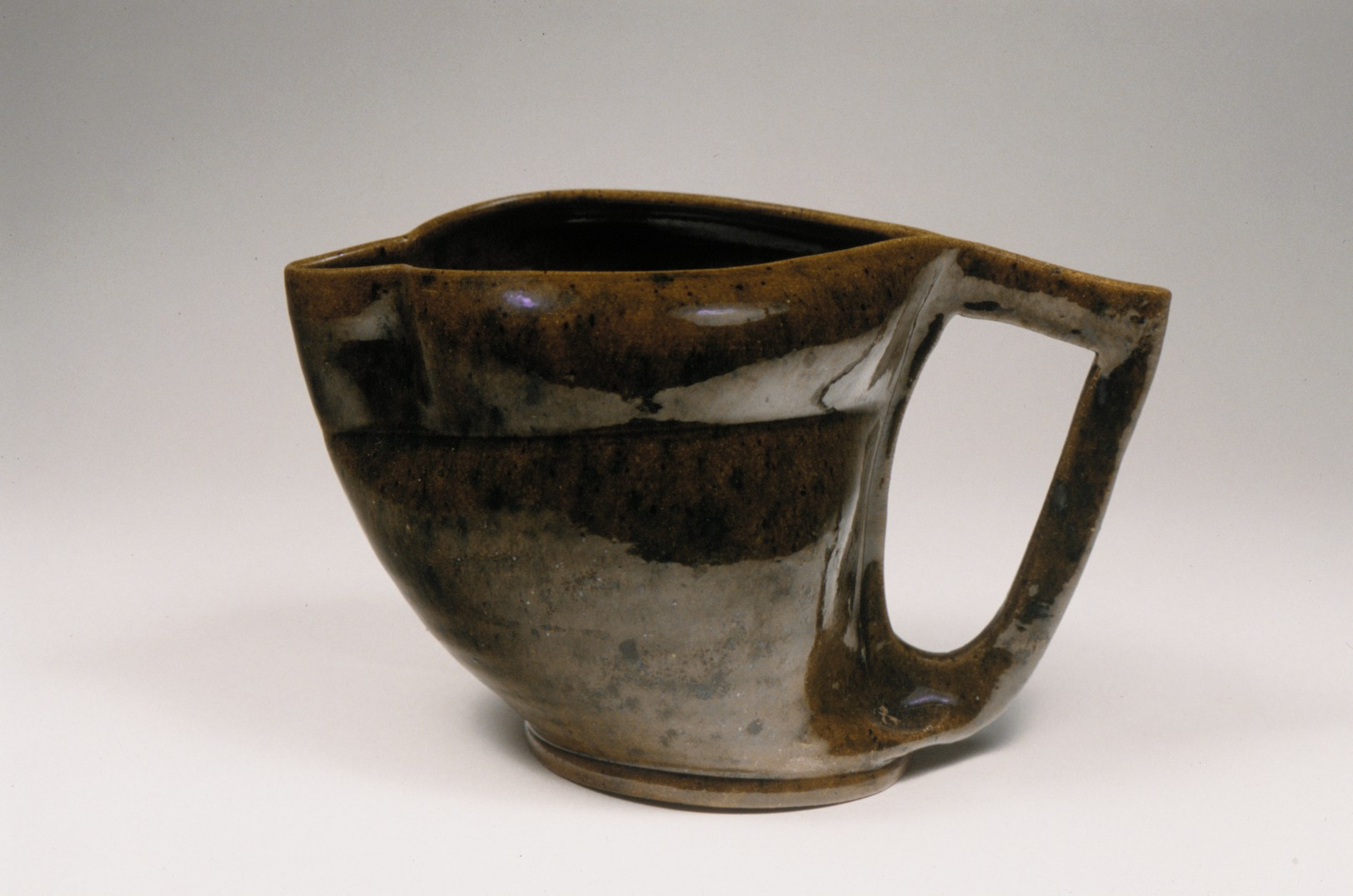
Pitcher

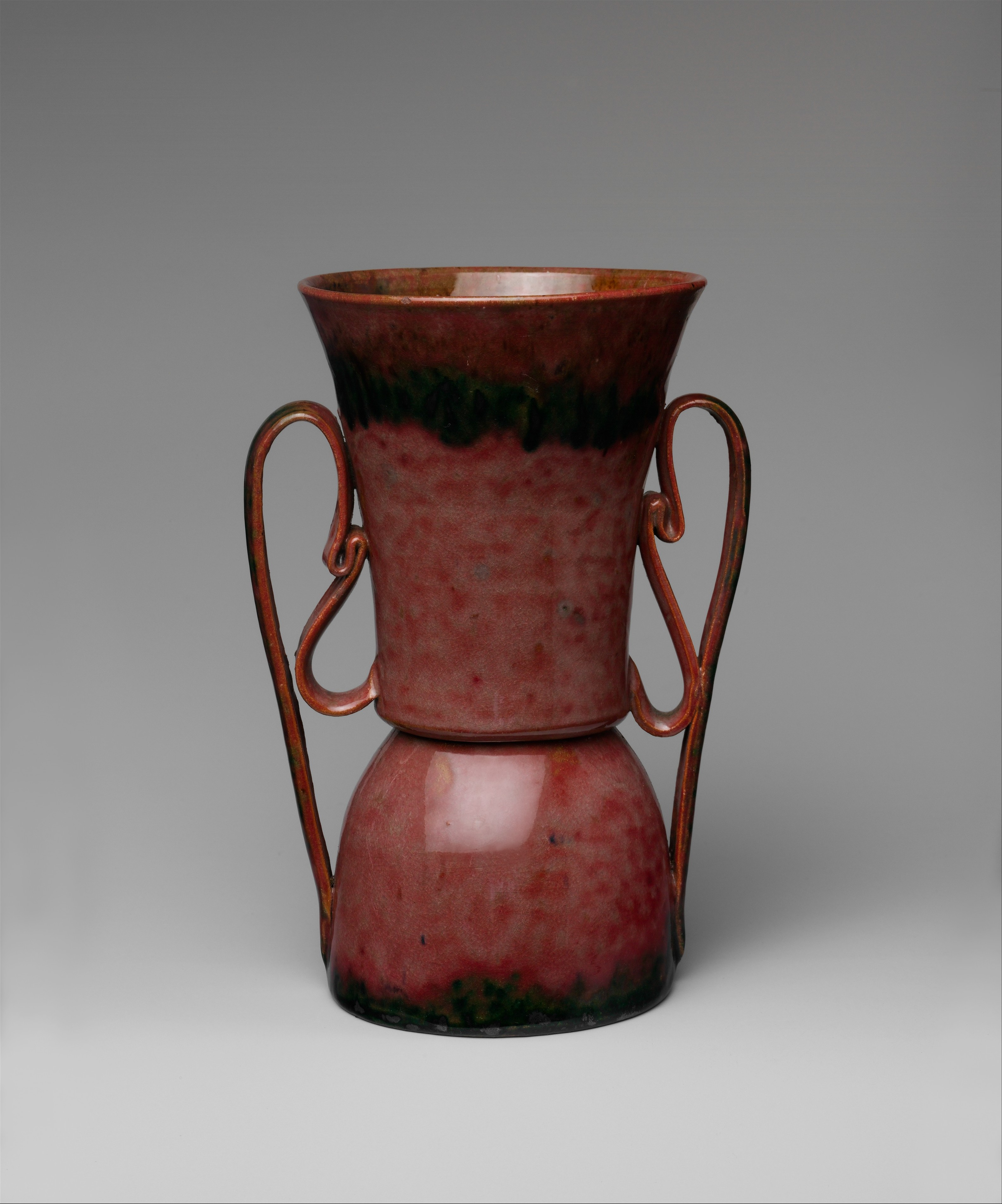
Vase

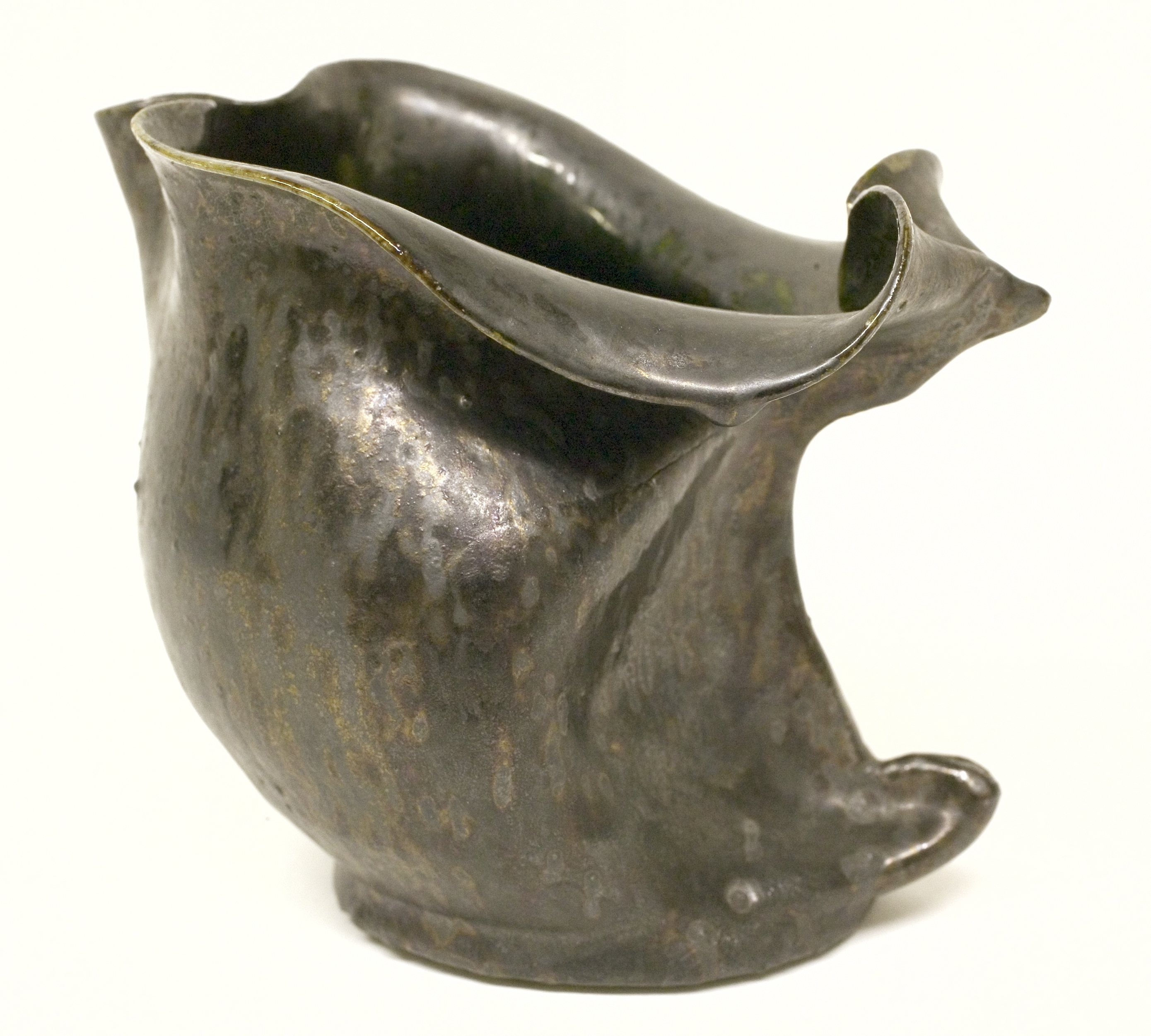
Pitcher

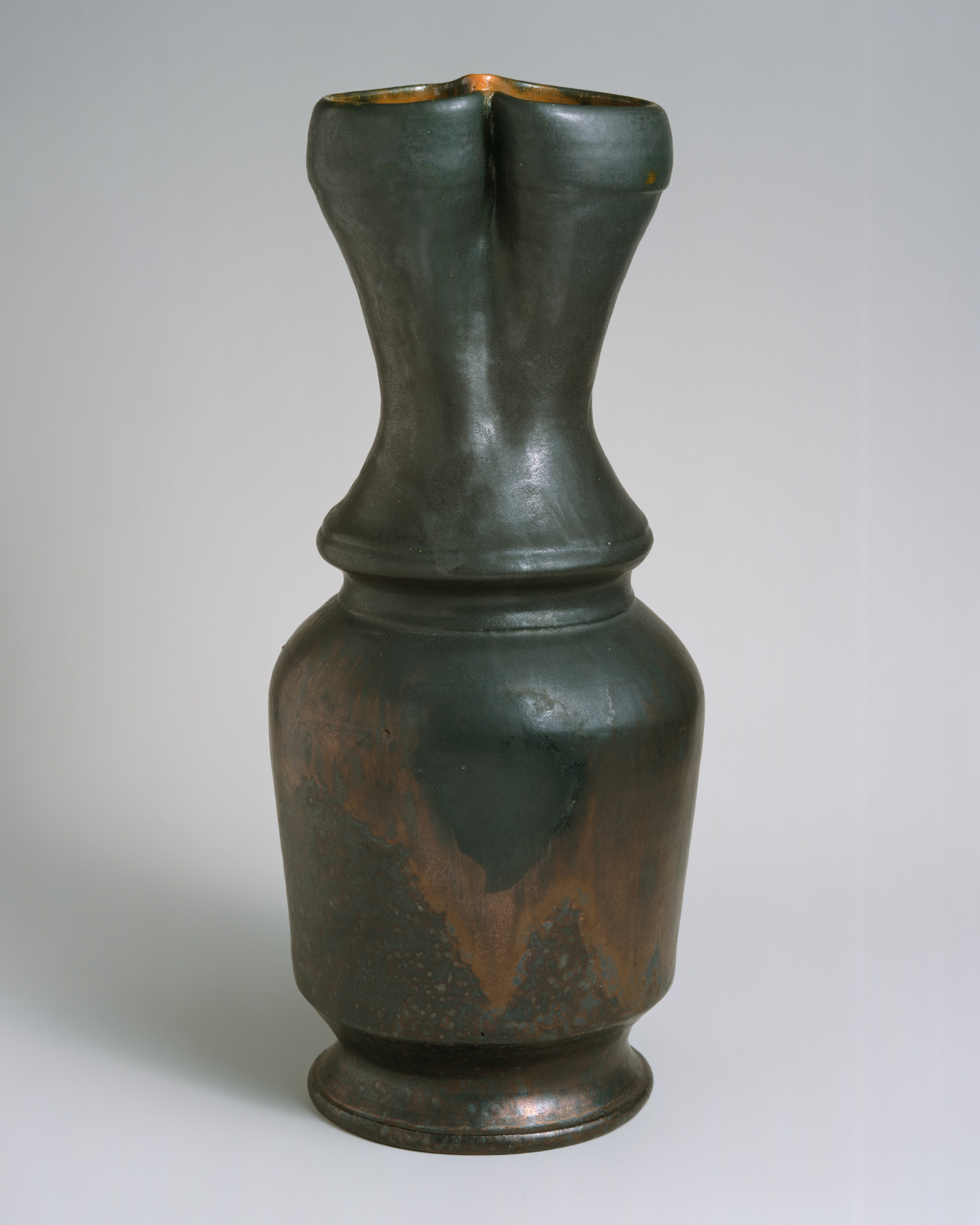
Vase

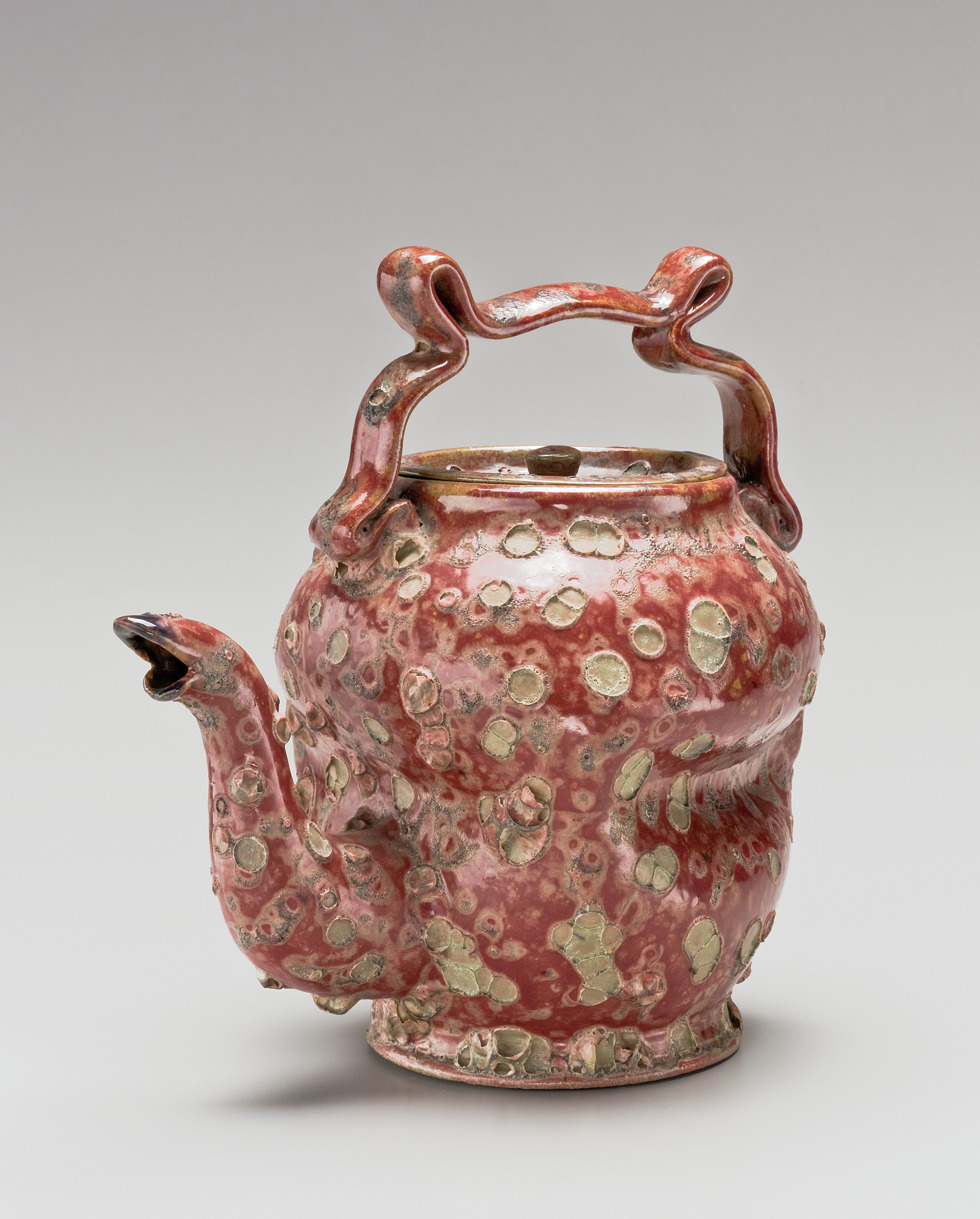
Teapot

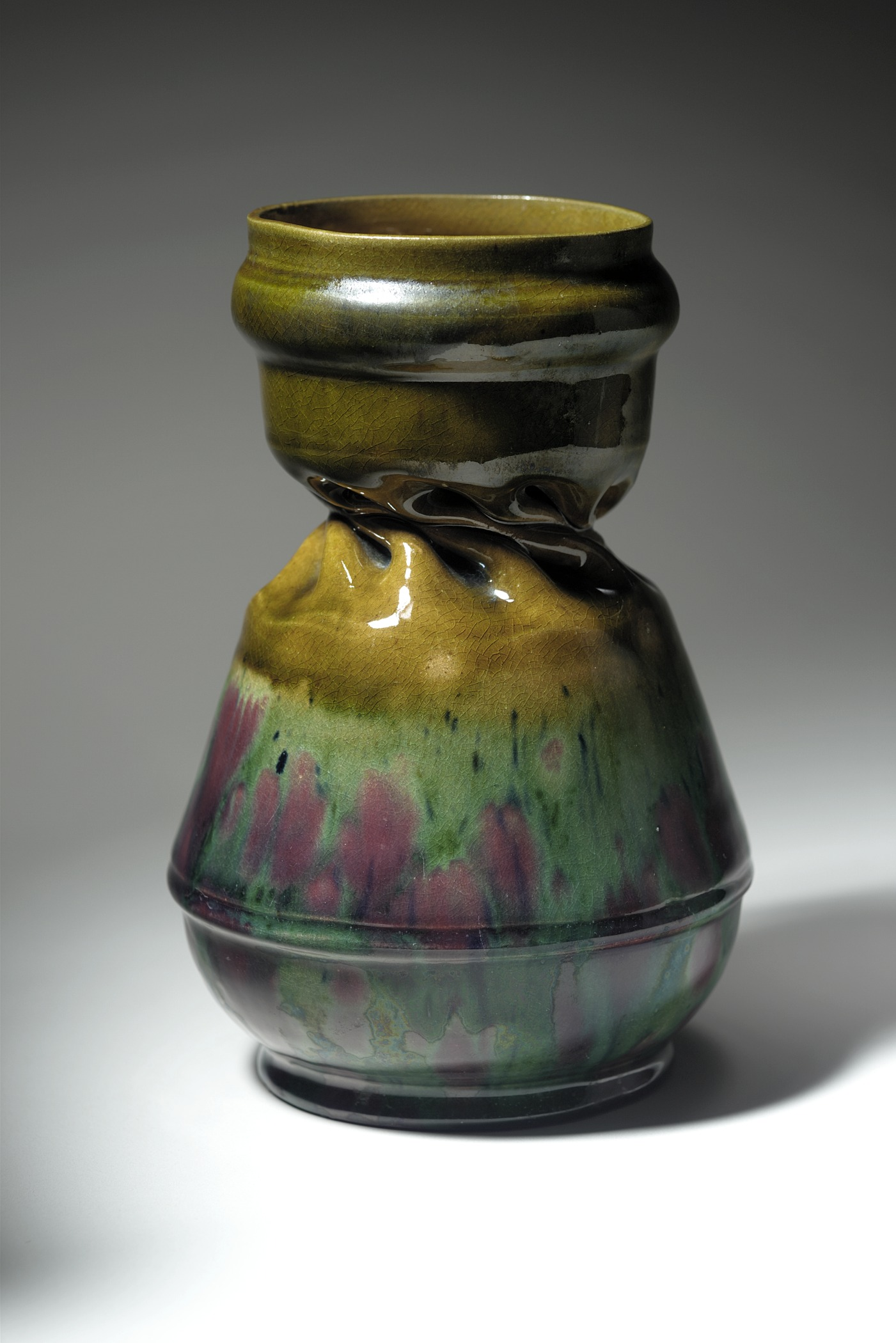
Vase

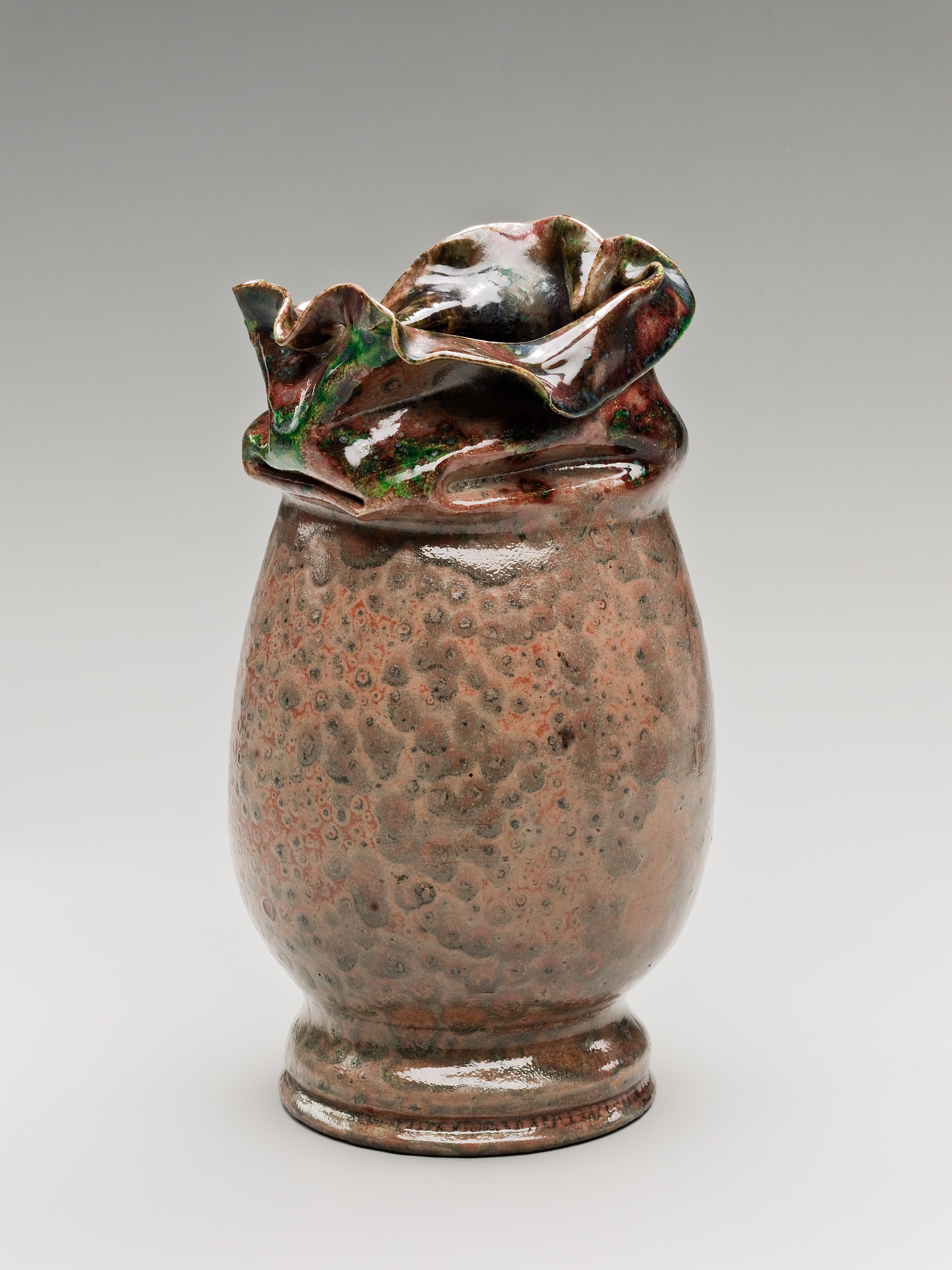
Vase
