= Ohr–O'Keefe Museum of Art =

Museum in Biloxi, Mississippi, US

Coordinates: 30°23′37″N 88°52′18″W

Ohr–O'Keefe Museum of Art _{Museum complex (2022)}
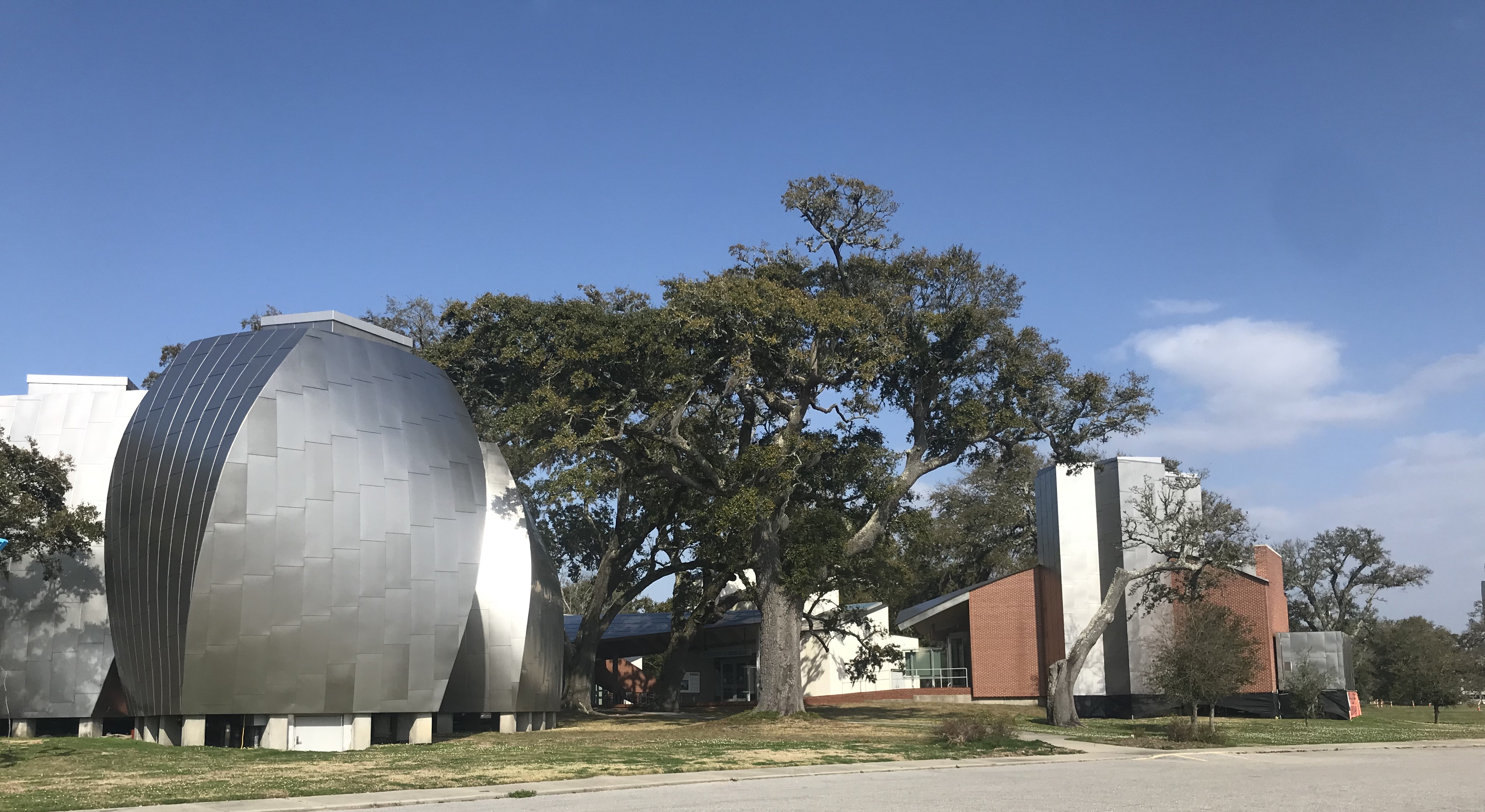
- Established: 1989 (present location 2010)
- Location: 386 Beach Boulevard, Biloxi, Mississippi
- Director: David Houston (2020)
- Curator: Erin Lee Antonak (2020)
- Website: georgeohr.org

The Ohr–O'Keefe Museum of Art is a non-profit art museum located in Biloxi, Mississippi, dedicated to the ceramics of George E. Ohr, the self-proclaimed "Mad Potter of Biloxi". The museum is named for ceramic artist George E. Ohr (1857–1918), as well as Annette O'Keefe, late wife of former Biloxi mayor Jeremiah Joseph O'Keefe III, who was instrumental in donating money and raising funds for the completion of the museum campus.

== Construction ==
The five-building museum campus was designed by architect Frank Gehry to "dance" with the ancient live oak trees on the 4-acre (1.6-hectare) site.

Construction of museum buildings began in 2004. In August 2005, the museum was damaged during Hurricane Katrina, when a casino barge was washed onto the semi-constructed facility.

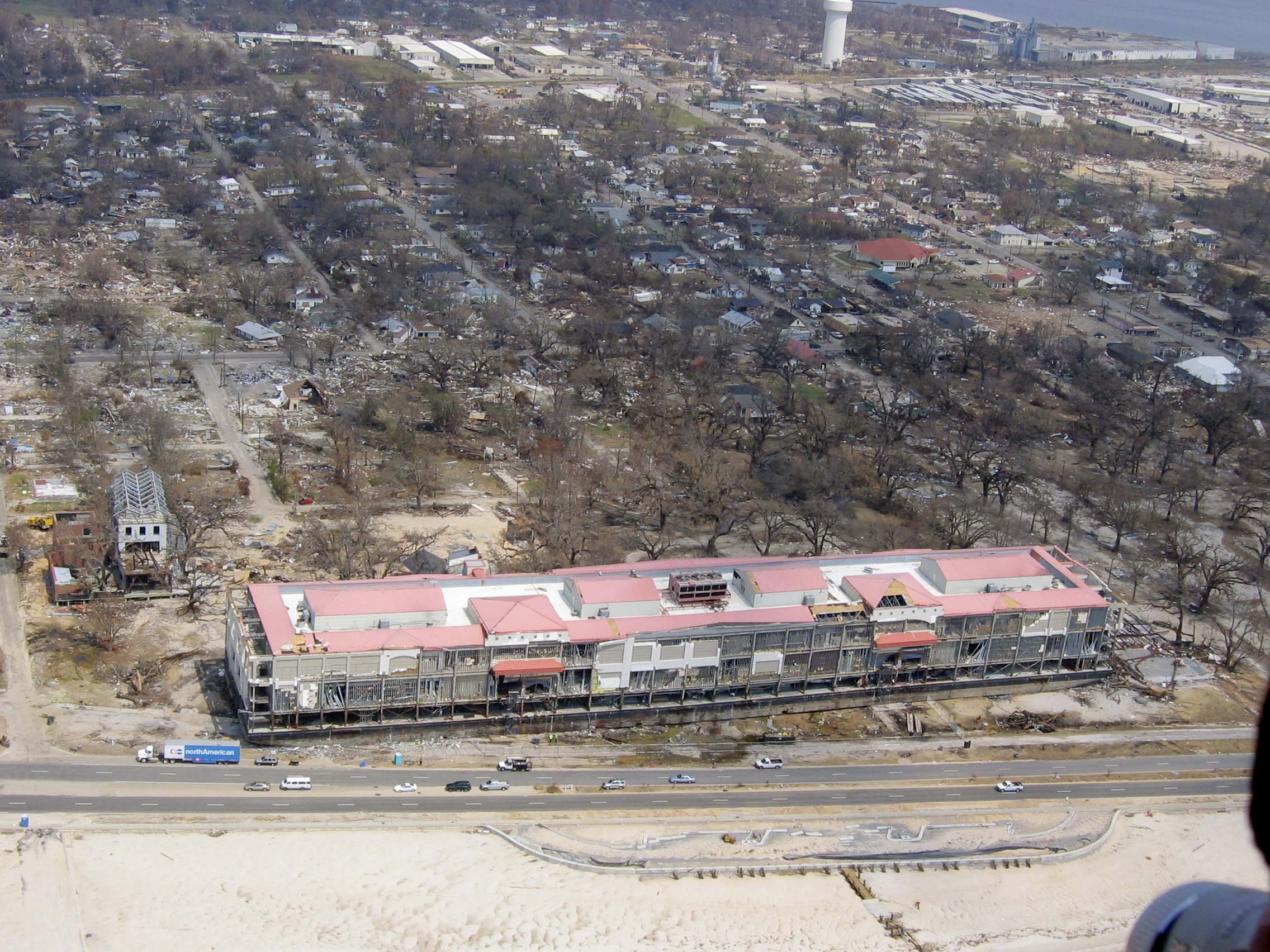
Aerial view of the casino barge washed onto the site of the Ohr–O'Keefe Museum in September 2005

Zahner of Kansas City, Missouri, was the subcontractor for the museum's curving structures and metalwork, described as "stainless-steel pods designed to dance among the live oaks" ... On November 8, 2010, three buildings on the east side of the campus opened with outstanding exhibitions, including George Ohr pottery from Gulf Coast collections. The Mississippi Sound Welcome Center, the IP Casino Resort & Spa Exhibitions Gallery, and the Gallery of African American Art are open, in addition to the Pleasant Reed Interpretive Center. The City of Biloxi Center for Ceramics opened in September 2012. The John S. and James L. Knight Gallery, which will house the George Ohr pottery, is scheduled for completion in 2014.

The museum offers pottery classes at the Center for Ceramics, which houses a state of the art ceramics studio and classrooms. In addition, the Ohr–O'Keefe Museum of Art is continuing its community and school outreach programs, to include the OOMA-Ed program for kids and adults. Summer youth programs (SOOMA) are also held in the Center for Ceramics.

In July 2011, less than a year after it opened, the Ohr–O'Keefe Museum was facing financial difficulties because revenues were not sufficient to cover operating costs. In October 2011, the Biloxi City Council agreed to provide financial support for the museum, which is housed in city-owned buildings, with an expectation that the museum would grow into a center for cultural tourism.

== Gallery ==
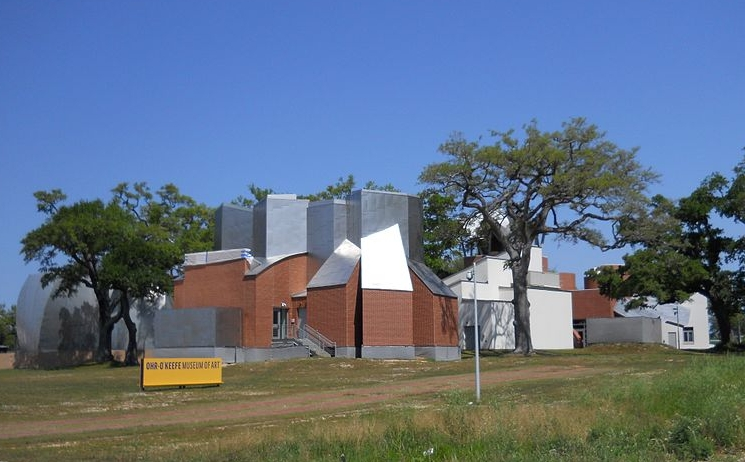
The Ohr–O'Keefe Museum of Art campus

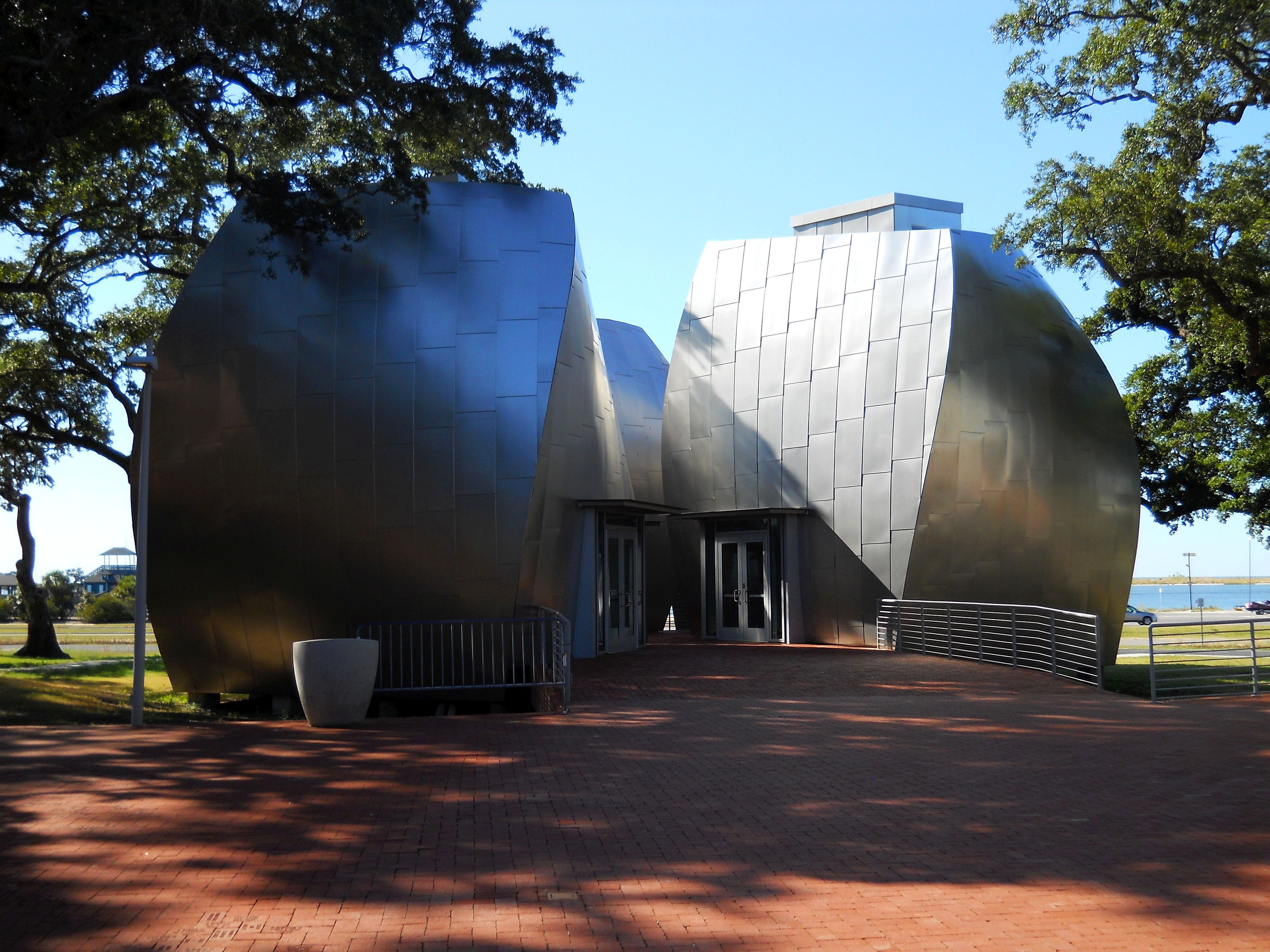
John S. and James L. Knight Pod Pavilion

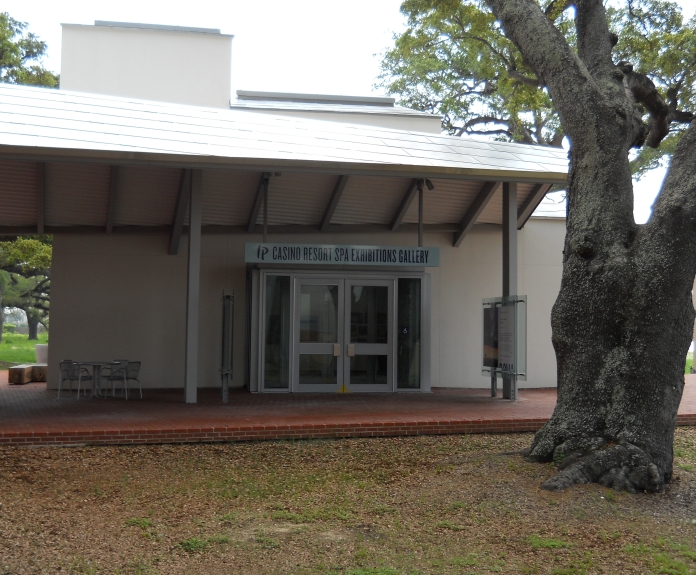
IP Casino Resort & Spa Exhibitions Gallery

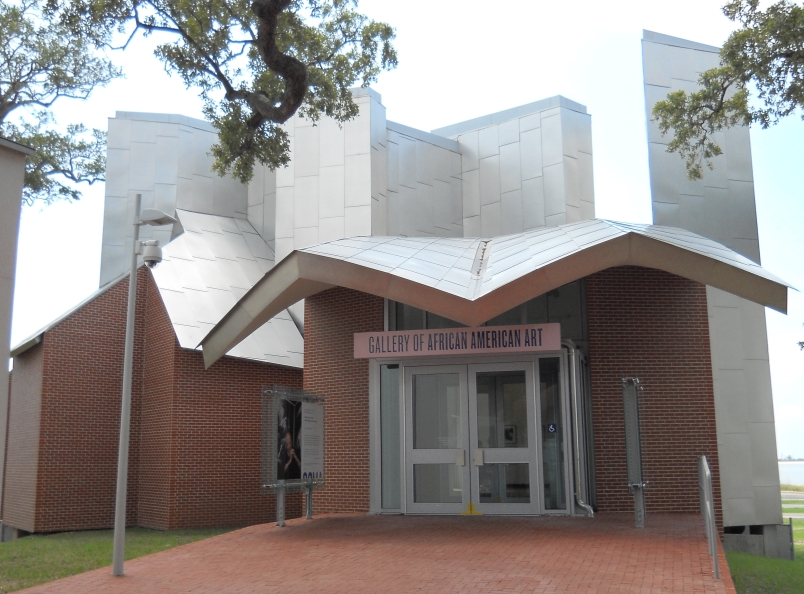
Gallery of African American Art

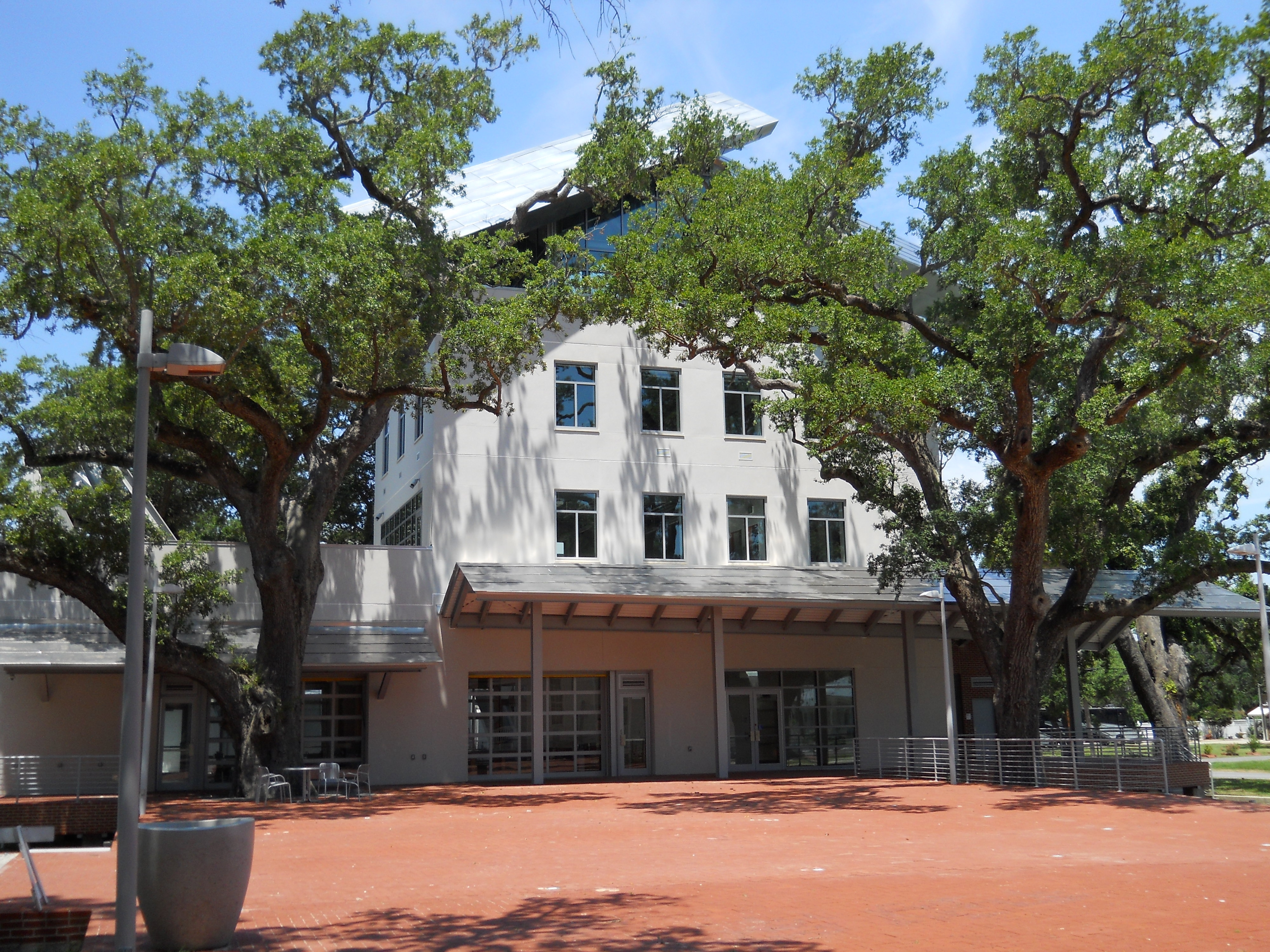
City of Biloxi Center for Ceramics

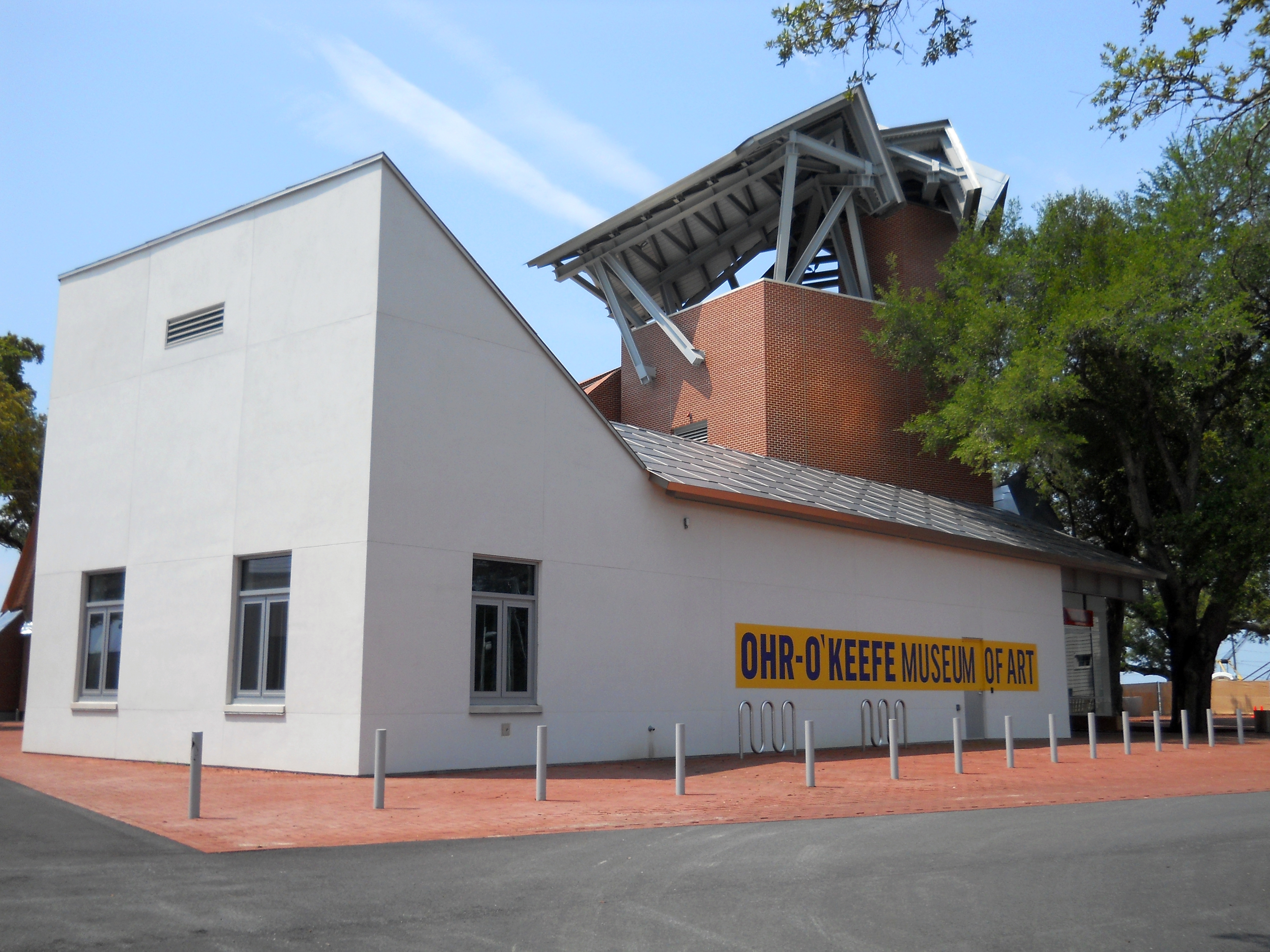
Mississippi Sound Welcome Center

Pleasant Reed Interpretive Center

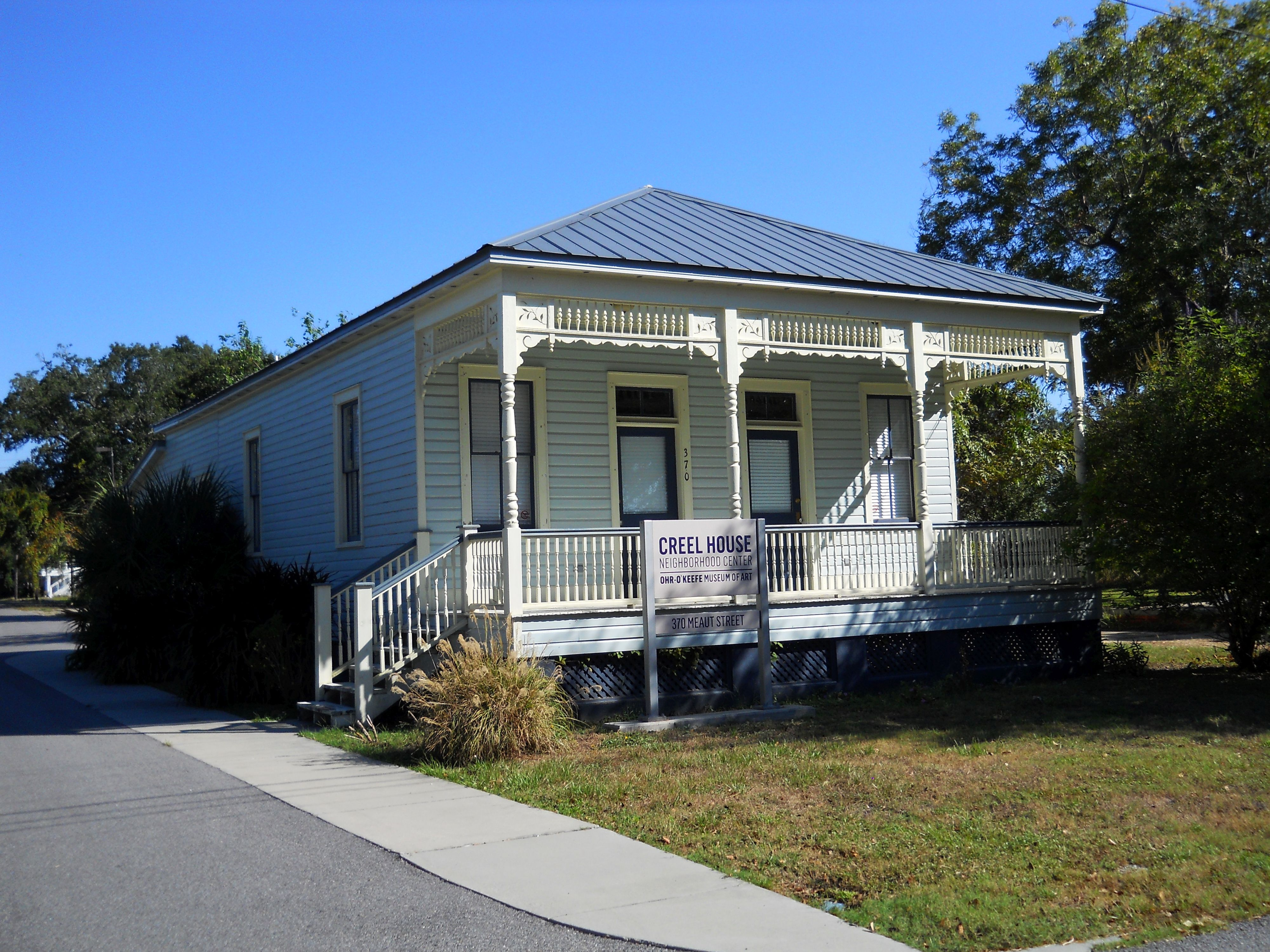
Creel House

== See also ==
- List of single-artist museums
- List of works by Frank Gehry
