= Pleasant Reed House =

Historic house in Mississippi, United States

- Formerly listed on the U.S. National Register of Historic Places
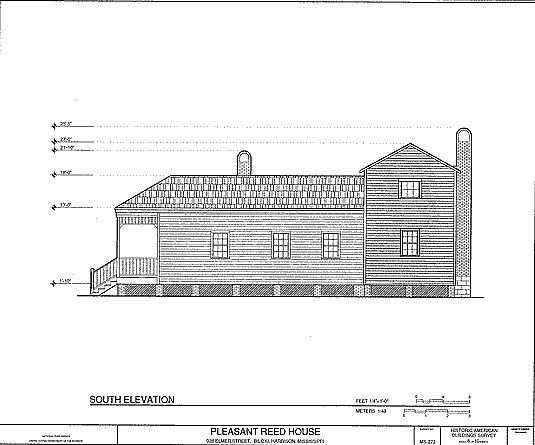
- Drawing of Pleasant Reed House

- Location within Mississippi Location within the United States
- Location: Original site: 306 Elmer Street, Biloxi, Mississippi
- Coordinates: 30°23′38″N 88°52′18″W
- Built: circa 1887
- Architect: Pleasant Reed
- Architectural style: Vernacular
- NRHP reference No.: 79001308

Significant dates
- Destroyed: August 29, 2005
- Added to NRHP: January 11, 1979
- Removed from NRHP: July 16, 2008

The Pleasant Reed House was a sidehall shotgun house in Biloxi, Mississippi on the National Register of Historic Places. It was built by Pleasant Reed (1854–1932), a former slave on a Mississippi farm who moved with his family to coastal Biloxi after the American Civil War. Reed, as a freedman, worked as a laborer and carpenter and earned the money to build his own house for his rapidly growing family.

The house was saved by the Biloxi chapter of the Delta Sigma Theta sorority and added to the National Register in 1979. In 2003, the House was moved to the new Frank Gehry-designed campus of the Ohr-O'Keefe Museum Of Art, where it was restored and opened to the public for tours.

On August 29, 2005, the House was destroyed by Hurricane Katrina. However, the original archival materials and photographs were saved by museum curators, and the museum's board of trustees voted to rebuild the Pleasant Reed House.

The Pleasant Reed Interpretive Center, a replica of the original house, opened to the public on September 29, 2008. The center features exhibits on local African American history.

Pleasant Reed Interpretive Center, August 2011
