= Catfish Museum and Welcome Center =

Museum in Belzoni, Mississippi, US

Coordinates: 33.17639°N 90.48991°W

The Catfish Museum and Welcome Center is a museum about the catfish industry in Belzoni, Mississippi.

== Location ==
The museum is located in a former IB&B Depot at 111 Magnolia Street in Belzoni, Humphreys County, Mississippi.

== Overview ==
The museum tells the story of the catfish industry in Humphreys County, Mississippi. Inside, there are exhibitions and a video. Outside, there are sculptures by Mississippi artists.
