= Big Level, Mississippi =

- Unincorporated community
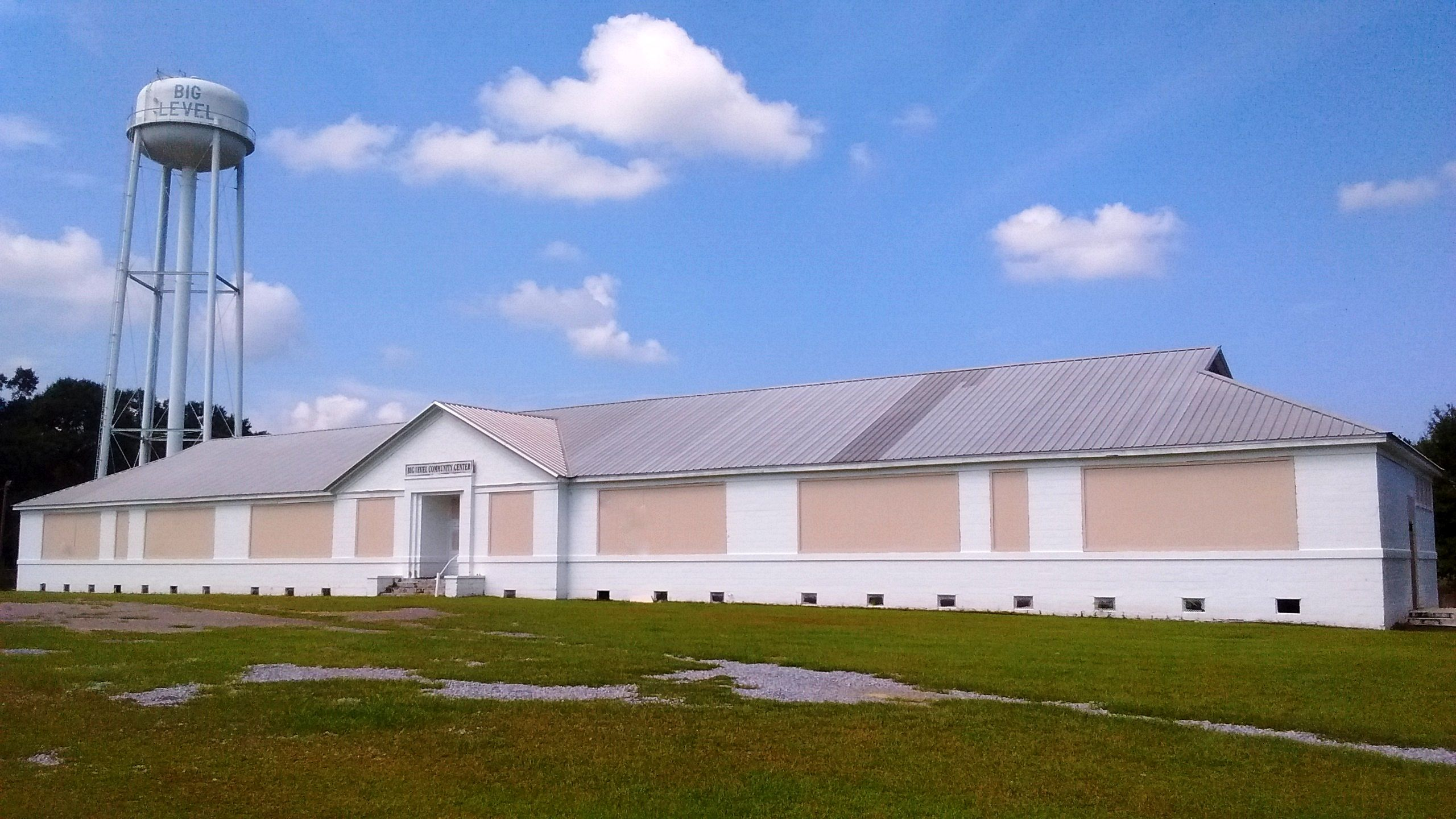
- Old Big Level School in 2017

- Location within Mississippi Location within the United States
- Coordinates: 30°48′42″N 89°3′5″W
- Country: United States
- State: Mississippi
- County: Stone
- Elevation: 180 ft (55 m)
- Time zone: UTC-6 (Central (CST))
  - Summer (DST): UTC-5 (CDT)
- ZIP codes: 39577, 39573
- Area code: Area code 601
- GNIS feature ID: 692605

Big Level is an unincorporated community in Stone County, Mississippi, United States. The community is situated approximately 6 miles (9.6 kilometers) east-southeast of Wiggins. It is part of the Gulfport–Biloxi, Mississippi Metropolitan Statistical Area.

== History ==
Early settlers in south Mississippi often named their communities for a person, place, or thing. The name Big Level was derived when a broad area of flat terrain was revealed during removal of the vast pine forests, beginning in the late 1800s. The boundary of the Big Level community is generally recognized locally as being bordered by Perry County to the north, Bluff Creek to the east, Red Creek to the south, and Flint Creek to the west.

The soil is fertile agricultural land that supported many small family farms and rural neighborhoods before World War II. In the latter half of the 20th century, residents began taking jobs in towns and cities near the Mississippi Gulf Coast and commuted to and from work.

Within the Big Level area, the communities of Wisdom and Mentorum had post offices in operation from the early 1890s until they closed around 1916; mail was then routed through Wiggins or Perkinston.

== Education ==
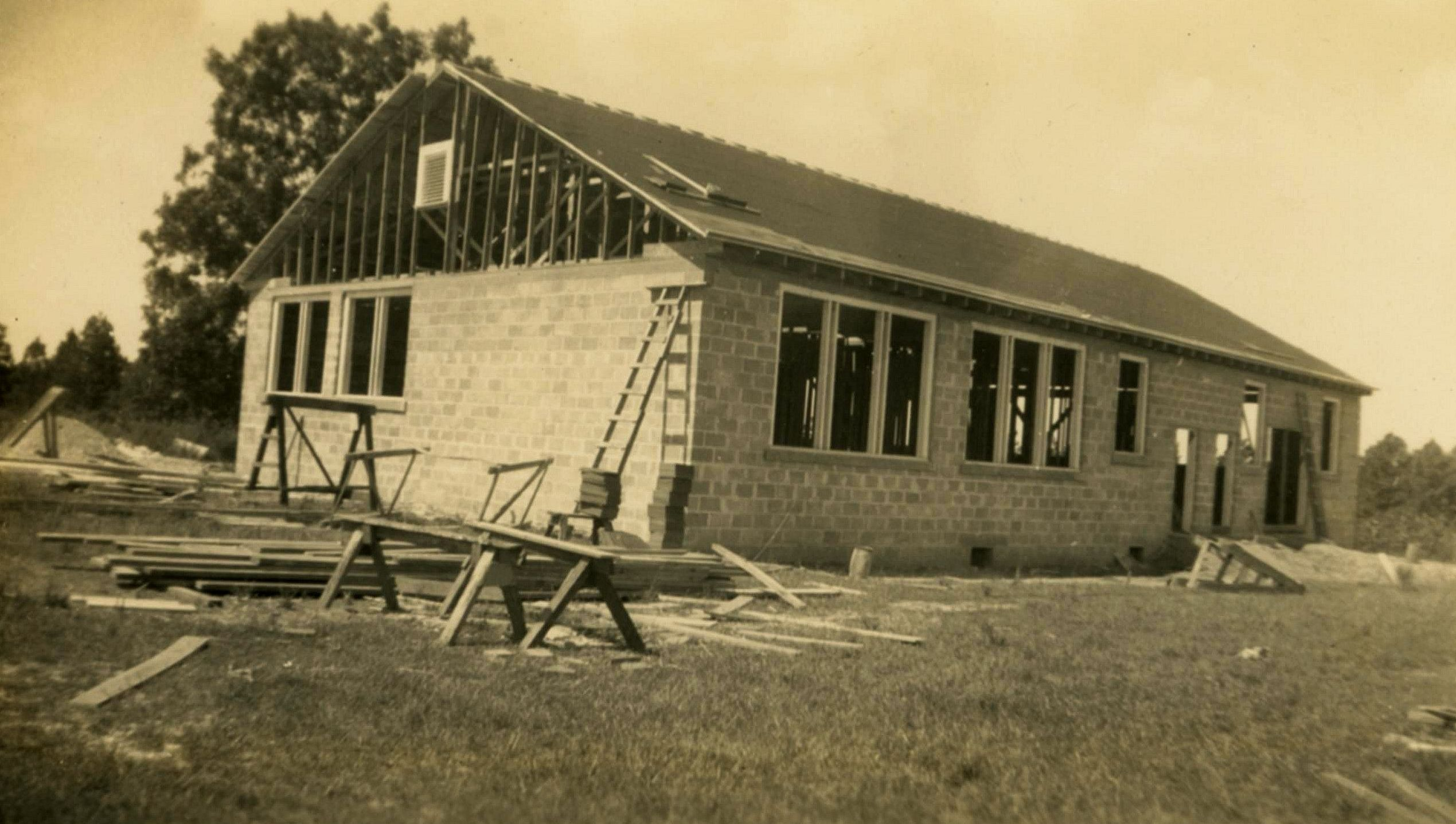
H.O.M.E. School Vocational Building under construction circa 1937-39

The Big Level community is served by the Stone County School District. In the first half of the 20th century, the Big Level community had its own public school building, but it closed during consolidation of Stone County schools.

== Transportation ==
- The Big Level community is served by Mississippi Highway 26 and county roads.
