= Beatrice, Mississippi =

- Unincorporated community
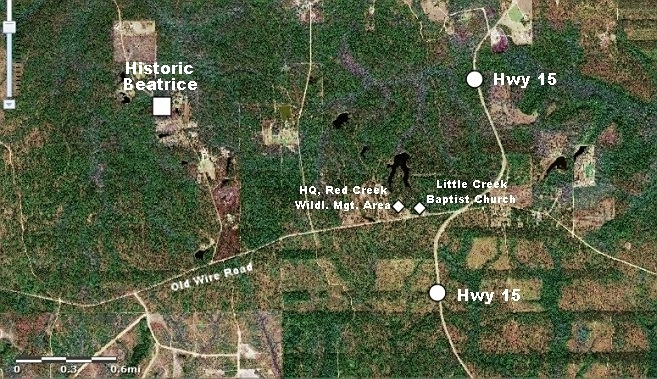
- Aerial view of Beatrice community

- Location within Mississippi Location within the United States
- Coordinates: 30°44′21″N 88°56′49″W
- Country: United States
- State: Mississippi
- County: Stone
- Elevation: 160 ft (50 m)
- Time zone: UTC-6 (Central (CST))
  - Summer (DST): UTC-5 (CDT)
- ZIP code: 39573
- Area code: Area code 601
- GNIS feature ID: 692497

Beatrice is an unincorporated community in Stone County, Mississippi, and is located approximately 23 miles (37 km) southeast of Wiggins. Beatrice is part of the Gulfport-Biloxi metropolitan area. The main period of significance was between 1894 and 1915.

Surrounded by the De Soto National Forest, Beatrice has long been a timber and sawmill community. In the wake of Hurricane Katrina, the Beatrice Sawmill served as a distribution center for portable sawmills that were needed to convert storm-ravaged trees into lumber.

Little Creek Baptist Church and headquarters for Red Creek Wildlife Management Area are located in the Beatrice community.

== Education ==
- The Beatrice community is served by the Stone County School District.

== Transportation ==
- The Beatrice community is served by Mississippi Highway 15.

== Notoriety ==
On the night of January 24, 2015, 57-year-old Timmy Garrison, owner of Beatrice Sawmill was found dead outside his place of business. Subsequent investigation by law enforcement revealed a murder-for-hire involving Evelyn Garrison, wife of the murder victim; Emmett Entriken, her childhood friend; and Entriken's distant cousin, Jody Parks. On March 10, 2017, 23-year-old Jody Parks pleaded guilty to capital murder and was sentenced to life in prison with no possibility of parole. On August 21, 2017, 56-year-old Evelyn Garrison accepted a plea of first-degree murder and received a sentence of life in prison with the possibility of parole. On September 16, 2017, the third suspect, 67-year-old Emmett Entriken, pleaded guilty to first-degree murder and was sentenced to life in prison with the possibility of parole.
