= Wiggins Depot (Mississippi) =

Historic building in Wiggins, Mississippi, United States

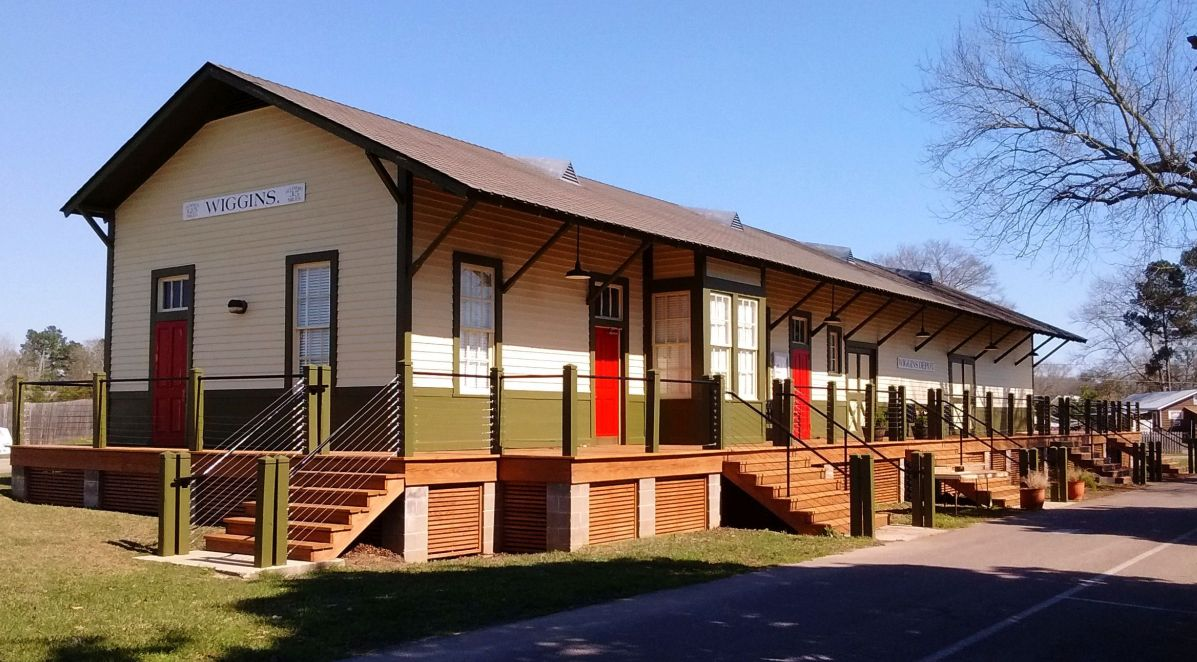
- Wiggins Depot, February 2017

- Location within Mississippi
- 30.86204°N 89.13757°W
- Location: 115 East Hatten Avenue; Wiggins, Mississippi 39577

History
- Built: 1910
- Built for: Gulf and Ship Island Railroad

Site notes
- Architect(s): Kevin Fitzpatrick; Bay Saint Louis, MS
- Restored: 2002-05 & 2007-08
- Restored by: City of Wiggins
- Governing body: City of Wiggins

Mississippi Landmark
- Official name: Gulf & Ship Island Railroad; Depot (II) [Wiggins Depot]
- Designated: April 6, 1999
- Reference no.: 131-WIG-0004.2-ML

The Wiggins Depot was constructed in Wiggins, Mississippi in 1910 by the Gulf and Ship Island Railroad (G&SIRR) to serve as a replacement for the company's original depot that was destroyed by fire in January of the same year. In the later half of the 20th century, the depot was being used only for storage and had fallen into disrepair. In 1999, the depot was acquired by the City of Wiggins and was designated a Mississippi Landmark. During the first decade of the 21st century, the depot was relocated within the city and was renovated for use as office space.

== History ==
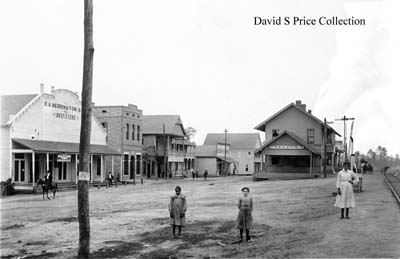
Original G&SIRR Depot (center right) in Wiggins before the 1910 fire

The G&SIRR was completed between Gulfport and Hattiesburg on January 1, 1897, and the town of Wiggins was the busiest population center along that route. In 1903, Finkbine Lumber Company opened a new sawmill in Wiggins, which required rail transportation for delivering logs to the mill and for shipping lumber to outside markets. The original G&SIRR depot in Wiggins was a two-story structure, but it was destroyed by fire on January 21, 1910.

The replacement G&SIRR depot was a one-story, wood-frame structure completed in 1910. It was located next to the railroad at 30°51′30″N 89°08′17″W. Without loading docks, the depot measured 110 feet (34 m) long and 25 feet (7.6 m) wide.

In 1924, G&SIRR became a subsidiary of Illinois Central Railroad and lost its independent identity in 1946. MidSouth Rail Corporation acquired the Illinois Central Railroad line from Gulfport to Hattiesburg in 1986, and Kansas City Southern Railway Company (KCS) purchased the line in 1994.

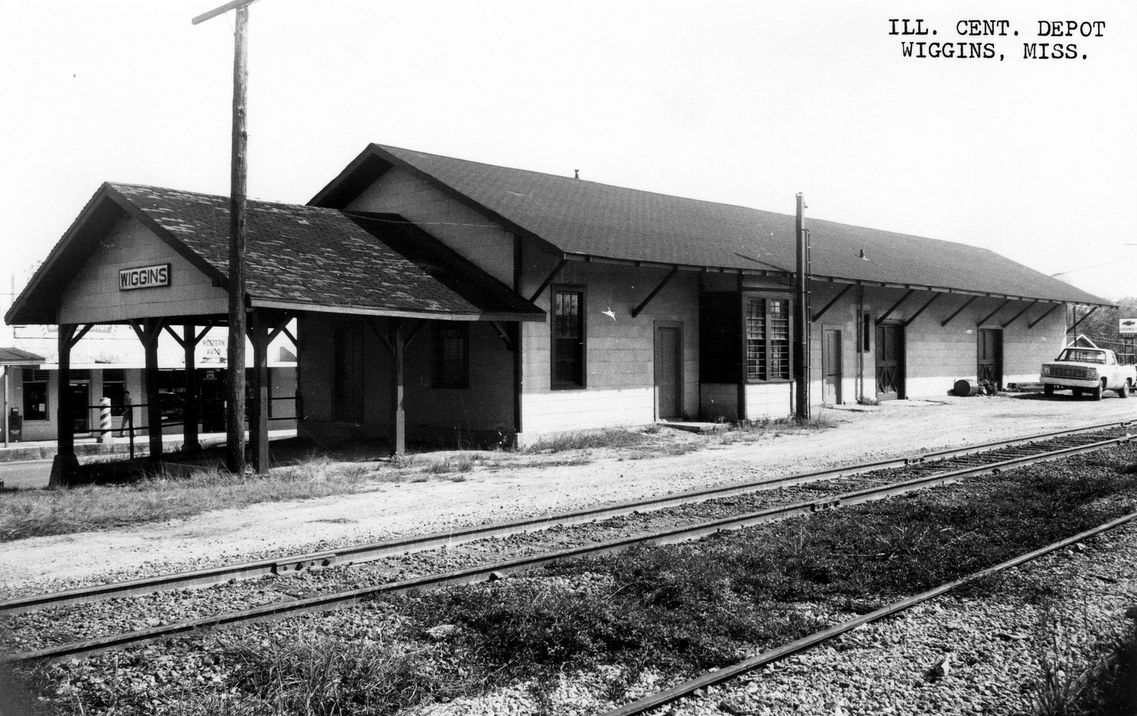
Wiggins Depot at its original location in 1960s

By the end of the 20th century, the Wiggins depot had fallen into a state of disrepair and was being used only for storage and as periodic office space by railroad personnel. Out of 14 G&SIRR depots built, the Wiggins depot was the only one still standing between Gulfport and Hattiesburg. KCS agreed to donate the depot to the City of Wiggins with the stipulation that it be moved off railroad property. Mississippi Department of Archives and History designated the depot a Mississippi Landmark on April 6, 1999, and issued a permit to the City of Wiggins for relocation and restoration of the structure with the intent of housing community activities, tourism functions, and offices for economic development.

== Restoration ==
On December 6, 2000, the depot was moved approximately 3 blocks to its new location on City property that was acquired in a land swap with Stone County. After the depot was designated a Mississippi Landmark, it qualified for a restoration grant under the Mississippi Department of Transportation Enhancement Program using federally allocated funds (80%) and local funding (20%). Restoration began approximately 18 months after the depot was secured at its new location.

During the summer of 2005, restoration of the depot was completed under the direction of architect Kevin Fitzpatrick, and Stone County Economic Development Partnership (SCEDP) occupied the building in mid-August of that year. On August 29, 2005, Hurricane Katrina struck south Mississippi, but caused only minor damage to the depot.

=== Tornado ===
On the night of January 4, 2007, a tornado hit the depot and destroyed half the roof. The architectural firm of Williams & Associates in Biloxi, was selected to plan the restoration. The tornado damage was repaired using funds obtained through an insurance settlement, and SCEDP moved back into the depot in June 2009.

Preceding station	Illinois Central Railroad	Following station
Bond toward Jackson	Gulf and Ship Island Railroad	Inda toward Gulfport
