= L.N. Dantzler Lumber Company =

1888–1966 lumber company in southeastern Mississippi

- Founded: 1888
- Founder: Lorenzo Nolly Dantzler
- Defunct: 1966
- Successor: International Paper Company
- Headquarters: Moss Point, Mississippi, United States
- Products: Southern yellow pine Tree farming
- Subsidiaries: Native Lumber Co. (1899–1931); Vancleave Lumber Co. (1903–1931); Handsboro Lumber Co. (1906–1914); Ten Mile Lumber Co. (1910–1922); Bond Lumber Co. (1915–1919); Cedar Lake Mill Co. (1919–1927)

L.N. Dantzler Lumber Company began as a small sawmill owned by William Griffin in Moss Point, Mississippi. L.N. Danzler bought it in the 1870s and, with two sons, incorporated the business in 1888. Originally, the main business was the manufacture of lumber from southern yellow pine, but in 1949, the company switched to tree farming of southern pines and sold timber by selective cutting to yield a variety of wood products. The family-owned business prospered for 75 years but was sold to International Paper Company in 1966.

== History ==
=== Early history ===
L.N. Dantzler Lumber Company had its beginning shortly before the American Civil War, when William Griffin acquired a sawmill at Moss Point, Mississippi, where the Pascagoula River and Escatawpa River converged. Lorenzo Nolly Dantzler married Griffin's daughter in 1857. He began to work with his father-in-law and purchased the sawmill from Griffin in the 1870s, later establishing it under his name.

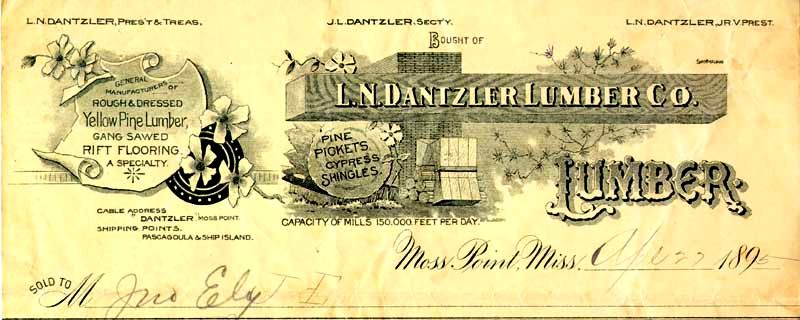
1895 receipt from L.N. Dantzler Lumber Company

With financial assistance from a New Orleans lumber merchant, L.N. Dantzler had a larger sawmill constructed along the Escatawpa River at Moss Point, and it began operation in 1885. The new sawmill began by processing 70,000 board feet of lumber per day, but within six years had increased daily production to 125,000 board feet. The new mill had kilns and machines for planing and edging the rough-cut lumber into finished products.

Dantzler persuaded two of his sons, J.L. and L.N. Dantzler, Jr., to join the company, and the three incorporated the L.N. Dantzler Lumber Company on March 1, 1888. The lumber company became the first privately chartered corporation in Mississippi.

For 20 years, the company relied on contract loggers to supply their sawmills, but in the 1890s, the company began buying large tracts of land to insure a more reliable source of timber. By the early 1900s, the company had acquired about 400,000 acres (160,000 ha) of timberland in the six southernmost counties of Mississippi.

=== Sawmills ===
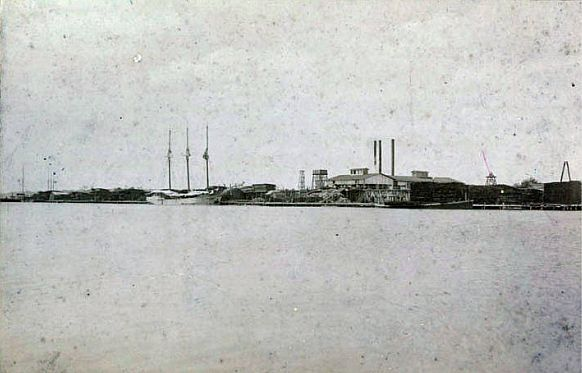
L.N. Dantzler Lumber Company sawmill at Moss Point, Mississippi (1909), courtesy of Special Collections Department, Mississippi State University Libraries

The sawmill's Moss Point location was well situated for receiving logs that were rafted down the Pascagoula and Escatawpa Rivers and their tributaries. But in order to access their inland timber-holdings, the company built a railroad from Vancleave, Mississippi, northwest into what would become Stone County. Processed lumber from their sawmills was transported by rail, then loaded onto company ships for export through the Gulf of Mexico to Mexico, South America, the Caribbean Islands and Europe. By 1913, the company was the largest exporter of lumber in Mississippi. With the advent of World War I, demand for lumber from overseas countries declined as their economies shifted to the war effort.

The company invested its profits from the Moss Point sawmill to purchase other existing sawmills and constructing new mills throughout south Mississippi. Their holdings once included the Bond Lumber Company (1915 to 1919), Cedar Lake Mill Company (1919 to 1927), Handsboro Lumber Company (1906 to 1914), Native Lumber Company (1899 to 1931), Ten Mile Lumber Company (1910 to 1922), and Vancleave Lumber Company (1903 to 1931).

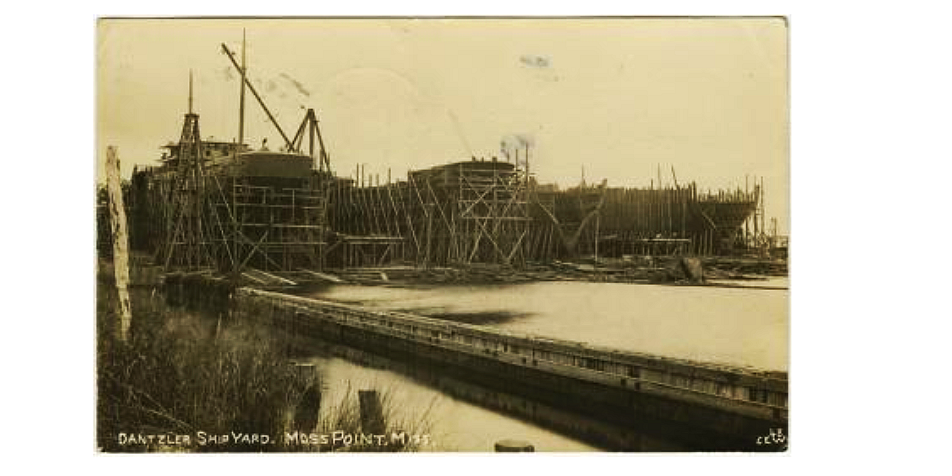
Dantzler Shipyard, Moss Point, Mississippi, circa 1910

=== Dantzler enterprises ===
In addition to sawmills, the Dantzler family owned naval store operations, a marine towing business, a ship building and dry docks company, a foundry and machine works company, a brick kiln, a mill for producing shingles, and a factory for making window sashes and blinds.

=== Paper mill ===
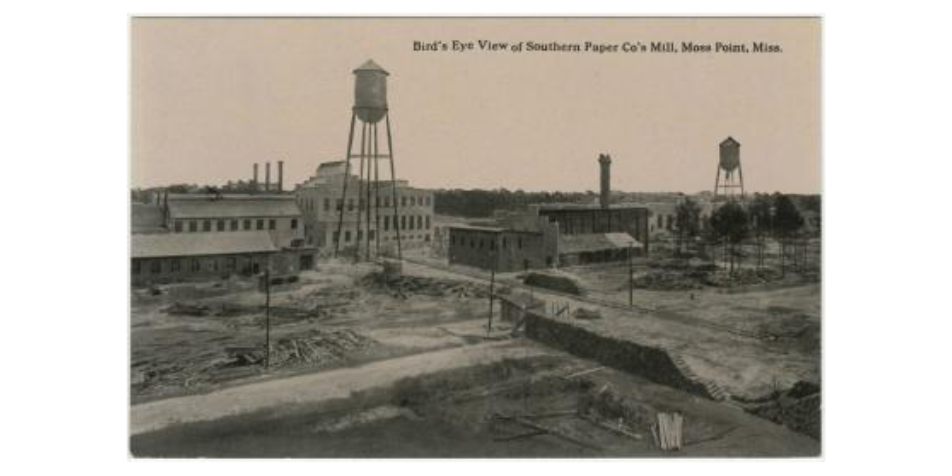
Southern Paper Company Mill, circa 1915

On a trip to England in the early 1900s, J.L. Dantzler consulted with paper industry experts about using the sulfate process for manufacturing kraft paper from southern pines. In 1911, the Dantzler's began construction of a paper mill in Moss Point to make use of waste slabs from their sawmills. The mill began operation in 1913 as Southern Paper Company. International Paper Company purchased the mill in 1928 and operated it through the end of the 20th century. The paper mill closed in 2001.

== Management practices shift ==
As the supply of virgin timber declined in the 1920s, the Dantzler Lumber Company gradually ended its use of railroad logging. It began implementing reforestation on its cutover lands. By the early 1940s, the company had begun selectively cutting their timber to extend their reserve of larger trees.

The company closed its Moss Point sawmill in 1942, and moved the company office to Ten Mile, near Perkinston, Mississippi. There they opened a new sawmill. During World War II, Dantzler Lumber Company entered into a contract with the War Department to use labor from the prisoner-of-war camp in Saucier, Mississippi for stacking, loading, and handling lumber at their Ten Mile sawmill.

In 1949, Dantzler Lumber Company ended all company-owned logging and mill operations, entered the business of tree farming, and began selling their timber on a selective basis so as to yield a variety of wood products: poles, pilings, sawlogs, and pulpwood. By mid-20th century, the company had reduced its timberland holdings from nearly half a million acres (200,000 hectares) to about 115,000 acres (47,000 ha). In 1966, the L.N. Dantzler Lumber Company was sold to International Paper Company.

== See also ==
- Fernwood Lumber Company
- Finkbine-Guild Lumber Company
- Great Southern Lumber Company
