= Mary Graham =

Mary Graham may refer to:

- Lady Mary Tudor (1673–1726), married name Mary Graham, daughter of Charles II of Great Britain
- Mary Margaret Graham, United States Deputy Director of National Intelligence for Collection, 2005–2008
- Mary Lou Graham (born 1936), former batgirl and relief pitcher in the All-American Girls Professional Baseball League
- Mary Graham (writer), American writer and academic
- Mary Henrietta Graham, first black woman to be admitted to, and first black person to graduate from, the University of Michigan
- Mary Olstine Graham (1842–1902), American educator
- Mary S. Graham, American academic administrator, president of Mississippi Gulf Coast Community College
- Molly Graham (Mary Allan Graham, 1880–1950), Scottish golfer
- Mary Graham McGeown (1923–2004), Northern Irish nephrologist and biochemist
- Mary Graham (camogie), participated in 1965 All-Ireland Senior Camogie Championship
