= Bond, Mississippi =

- Census-designated place
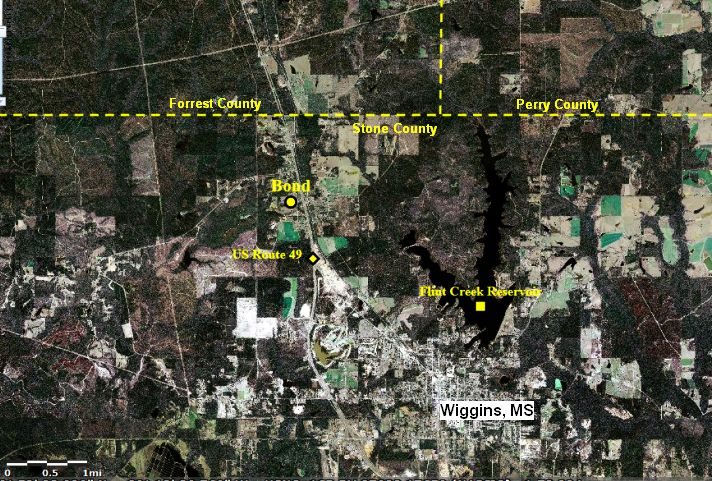
- Aerial view of Bond community

- Location within Mississippi Location within the United States
- Coordinates: 30°53′40″N 89°10′7″W
- Country: United States
- State: Mississippi
- County: Stone

Area
  - Total: 2.49 sq mi (6.46 km^{2})
  - Land: 2.49 sq mi (6.45 km^{2})
  - Water: 0.0039 sq mi (0.01 km^{2})
- Elevation: 305 ft (93 m)

Population (2020)
  - Total: 506
  - Density: 203.2/sq mi (78.46/km^{2})
- Time zone: UTC-6 (Central (CST))
  - Summer (DST): UTC-5 (CDT)
- ZIP code: 39577
- Area code: Area code 601
- GNIS feature ID: 692667

Bond is a census-designated place (CDP) and unincorporated community in northern Stone County, Mississippi, United States. The community is situated approximately 3 miles (4.8 km) north of Wiggins on U.S. Route 49, and is part of the Gulfport-Biloxi metropolitan area. Per the 2020 Census, the population was 506.

== History ==
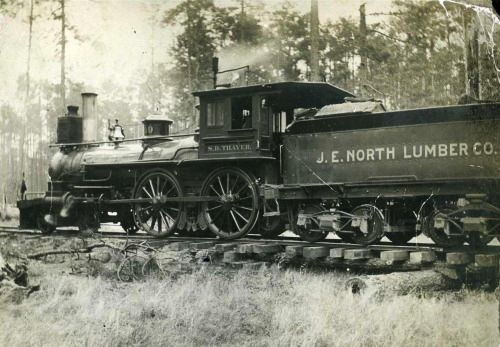
Locomotive of the J.E. North Lumber Company, circa 1907

Bond developed as a timber and sawmill community, and was home to J.E. North Lumber Company from 1899 to 1910. The lumber company's sawmill was located near the Gulf and Ship Island Railroad, which operated between Gulfport and Jackson, Mississippi. At its peak, the J.E. North sawmill produced 60,000 board feet of lumber per day, but went into receivership during the Panic of 1907, and was sold in 1910, forming the Bond Lumber Company.

Under new ownership, the sawmill increased production of lumber to 150,000 board feet per day. In 1915, L.N. Dantzler Lumber Company purchased the mill, but ceased operation there in 1919, as the supply of virgin pines was exhausted. In 1920, the Bond sawmill was dismantled and sold to General Equipment Company, of New Orleans, Louisiana.

By 1907, the Bond community had several stores and churches, a post office, a public school, and a bank. Once the virgin pine resource was depleted in south Mississippi, small sawmill towns, like Bond, faded rapidly, and the bank, school, and post office closed. One of the early churches, originally "Bond Methodist Episcopal Church" and now bearing the name "Bond United Methodist Church", was formed in 1885, and continues active ministry at its location along U.S. Route 49 in Bond.

Dizzy Dean, elected to the Baseball Hall of Fame and well-known sportscaster, was a resident after his retirement in the late 1960s. The Bond community was the family home of his wife, Patricia Nash. Dean's home in Bond was named Deanash, a combination of his name and his wife's maiden name; it was deeded by Dean's widow during her lifetime to the Mississippi Baptist Convention, which operates foster homes for children in a rural setting. Mrs. Dean retained a life estate in the property and lived there until her death. Since Patricia Nash Dean's death, the home has continued to be used as a home place for children by the Mississippi Baptist Convention.

Another noteworthy resident was Clayton Rand, who was an author and newspaperman, of some note, in the first half of the 20th century. Rand's formative years were spent in the Bond Community.

== Demographics ==
Historical population
Census	Pop.	Note	%±
2020	506		—
U.S. Decennial Census; 2020

Bond was first listed as a census designated place in the 2020 U.S. census.

=== 2020 census ===
Bond CDP, Mississippi – Racial and ethnic composition Note: the US Census treats Hispanic/Latino as an ethnic category. This table excludes Latinos from the racial categories and assigns them to a separate category. Hispanics/Latinos may be of any race.
Race / Ethnicity (NH = Non-Hispanic)	Pop 2020	% 2020
White alone (NH)	314	62.06%
Black or African American alone (NH)	145	28.66%
Native American or Alaska Native alone (NH)	3	0.59%
Asian alone (NH)	4	0.79%
Native Hawaiian or Pacific Islander alone (NH)	3	0.59%
Other race alone (NH)	4	0.79%
Mixed race or Multiracial (NH)	18	3.56%
Hispanic or Latino (any race)	15	2.96%
Total	506	100.00%

== Education ==
The Bond community is served by the Stone County School District.

== Transportation ==
- Highway: U.S. Route 49.
- Railroad: Kansas City Southern Railroad.
