= Silver Run, Mississippi =

- Unincorporated community
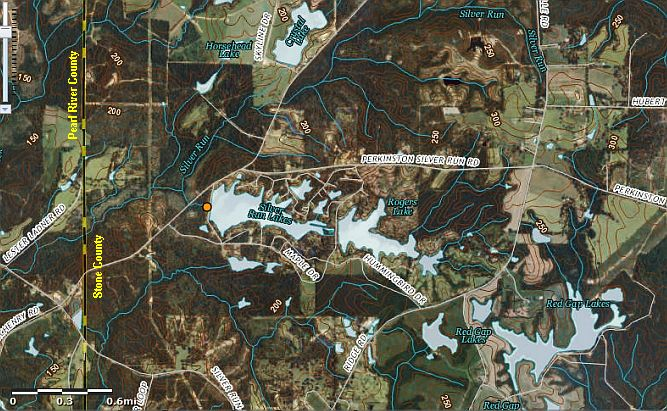
- Aerial view of Silver Run Community

- Location within Mississippi Location within the United States
- Coordinates: 30°44′01″N 89°20′44″W
- Country: United States
- State: Mississippi
- County: Pearl River and Stone
- Elevation: 174 ft (53 m)
- Time zone: UTC-6 (Central (CST))
  - Summer (DST): UTC-5 (CDT)
- ZIP codes: 39573, 39470
- Area code: Area code 601
- GNIS feature ID: 694791

Silver Run is an unincorporated community situated approximately 18 miles (29 km) southwest of Wiggins, Mississippi. The community is part of the Gulfport-Biloxi metropolitan area. The name, Silver Run, was derived from a natural stream that flows through the southwestern portion of Stone County, Mississippi.

== History ==
The Silver Run community was founded in 1874 and was settled by four families who were farmers. There was a small school, a church, and a graveyard. The Oak Grove Missionary Baptist Church was established in 1871 and is still active as the Silver Run Baptist Church. Many of the descendants of the original families worship there.

Silver Run is located in the far reaches of eastern Pearl River County and western Stone County and has a thriving general store, volunteer fire department and public library.

Silver Run Lakes is a subdivision that was developed around man-made lakes in the Silver Run community. The concept for Silver Run Lakes began as a camp for children, but without the finances to support it. Construction of the first man-made lake (Silver Run) began in 1961. To finance construction, land lots were surveyed around the lake and sold as retreats for camping and recreation.

The children's camp opened in 1962 and attracted children from throughout south Mississippi and New Orleans. Camp activities included fishing, swimming, hay rides, camp fires, and farm life. The camp lasted only three years.

Through the years, more lakes were constructed, land lots were surveyed and sold, homes were built, a sewerage system was installed, and roads were constructed. By 2010, there were 15 man-made lakes, with the two largest being Silver Run Lake and Rogers Lake, at 100 acres (40 ha) each.

== Education ==
- The Silver Run community is served by the Stone County School District and the Poplarville Separate School District.

== Transportation ==
- The Silver Run community is served by county roads.
