= Emilie Blackmore Stapp =

American writer

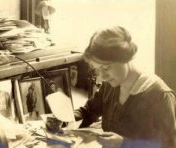
- Emilie Blackmore Stapp (circa 1915)
- Occupation: Children's author

Emilie Blackmore Stapp (1876–1962) was an American children's author and philanthropist whose writing career spanned over 50 years. She was born in Madison, Indiana, on July 4, 1876, and died June 29, 1962, in Wiggins, Mississippi, where she is buried. Her first book Bread and 'Lasses: Sketches of Child Life was published in 1902.

== Early life ==
Emilie Stapp's father, David Wilbur Stapp, and her mother, Carrie Blackmore, moved their family which included their oldest daughter Florence, sons Hal and Fred and youngest daughters Emilie and Marie to Des Moines, Iowa in 1883. Following the sudden death of her mother at the age of 50, in 1893, and upon her graduation from high school, Emilie went to work as an associate editor with a weekly newspaper in Des Moines. Soon she found herself hired as editor of the literary page of the Des Moines Capital, the sister newspaper of The Des Moines Register, which served as the daily evening newspaper for the Des Moines area.

In 1902, her first book, Bread and 'Lasses: Sketches of Child Life was published. This was followed by The Trail of the Go-Hawks in 1908; Uncle Peter-Heathen in 1912; The Squaw Lady in 1913 and Little Billy Bowlegs in 1916.

== The Go-Hawks Happy Tribe ==
In 1913, Stapp founded the Go-Hawks Happy Tribe, a national philanthropic organization which welcomed both boys and girls. The organization similar to today's Boy Scouts and Girl Scouts, had a membership of over 80,000 children and adults. Membership was open to anyone regardless of race or ethnic background who performed at least one act of kindness per day. "To Make The World A Better Place" was the organization's motto. Two prominent adult members of the "Go-Hawks Tribe" were James Whitcomb Riley, Big Chief of the United States, and Rudyard Kipling, Big Chief of England.

In her 1914 letter, Stapp asked Riley to be the head of the Go-Hawks Happy Tribe saying; "It seems to be the desire of the children of Indiana that you should be designated Chief of their happy tribe. The Go-Hawks Happy Tribe is composed of good little Indians from 7 to 77 who are discovering that the only real happiness in life lies in service. All over the country children are showing fealty to the tribe by donning the button emblem of service. So here's your button which makes you a member for life. If you are caught without it some young Indian brave or squaw may rise up and scalp you." Riley replied back, "I am happy to be the chief of both the little children and those with the spirit of little children, even though 'the golden hair be gray.'" Stapp wrote back, asserting, "I am so glad you have not grown up. Neither have I. You must never tell my employer, nor any of those many publishers who overwhelm me with books for criticism, but I still believe in fairies."

== World War I ==
In June 1917 with World War I raging in Europe, Stapp mobilized her Go-Hawks Happy Tribe to raise 4,300,892 pennies or $43,008.92 to feed the widows and orphans of Europe. For her extraordinarily compassionate efforts to care of the orphans created by World War I, Emilie Blackmore Stapp was decorated by both the governments of France and Belgium for distinguished service. King Albert I of Belgium presented her with the honor of the Queen Elizabeth Medal for her distinguished, unselfish and loyal service to the people of Belgium. In addition, the government and people of France bestowed upon Stapp, the honor of the French Medal for Distinguished Service for her efforts to feed the orphans and widows of France.

== After WWI ==
In May 1921, Stapp left the Des Moines Capital for a new position as Children's Editor with the Houghton Mifflin Company in Boston. In Boston, Stapp continued her philanthropic work by forming The World Neighbor Club in 1923, in cooperation with the American Red Cross. The purpose of The World Neighbor Club was to establish relationships with and befriend children of different countries and to create libraries throughout the world where children could learn the English language. In a thank-you letter, a student from The Albanian Vocational School writes to Stapp, "We thank you very much for the kindness you have done the Albanian children, and we thank you also very much for the books you send to us. We will never forget our best friends of America, and we will try to repay these good deeds you are doing."

Emilie Stapp continued in her work as Children's Editor at Houghton Mifflin until 1925 when she was forced to resign due to ill health. After leaving Houghton Mifflin Company, Emilie Blackmore Stapp authored Little Streets of Beacon Hill, published in 1928 by the J.F. Olsson Company. About this same time she, and sister Marie, moved to the small town of Wiggins, Mississippi where they had acquired 80 acres (32 ha) of land two miles (3 km) east of town on Mississippi Highway 26. They named their new property Friendship Farm. In the quiet solitude of southern Mississippi, Emilie Stapp could fully devote herself to creative writing. Upon the fertile ground of Friendship Farm, Emilie and Marie Stapp established a pecan orchard and built their home, a Cape Cod design, they named The Dolls' House. The home, built from the virgin southern yellow pine timber of south Mississippi, received its name from a rare collection of over 400 dolls of historic significance, that the Stapp sisters acquired from their world travels and prominently displayed there.

Soon after their arrival in Wiggins, Mississippi, Emilie and her sister Marie, became actively involved within the community. In 1932, they deeded 12 acres (4.9 ha) of land and a club house to the Women's Club of Wiggins, and with a donation of over 4,000 books, they established the first lending library in Stone County, Mississippi. Becoming concerned with the dilapidated condition of the old post office, the Stapp sisters funded construction of a new post office for the City of Wiggins.

During the 1930s Emilie Stapp became a regular contributor to many renowned children's publications of the day. Her writings appeared in such publications as Little Folks Magazine, John Martin's Book, St. Nicholas, Youth's Companion, and The Christian Science Monitor where she also served as Children's Editor. In 1935, Stapp authored the novel Penny Wise. The story of Penelope Wiseman a teenage detective based on Stapp's popular serial of the same name, published in The Christian Science Monitor.

By 1936, Emilie and Marie Stapp's Dolls' House was opened to the public as a tourist attraction. Tours were conducted by appointment and the home was listed in such publications as Mississippi; A Guide To The Magnolia State, published in 1938 by Viking Press and in The Chevron Travel Guide.

Emilie and Marie's brother Fredrick Markley Stapp, his wife Susan Ermina (Reed) Stapp and their two children Carrie Nell Stapp (Smith) and Emilie Marie Stapp (Rausch) also lived on Friendship Farm. Carrie Nell's daughter Suzanne Smith (Day Hartness) is a character in the Isabella Book series.

In 1940, Emilie Stapp authored Isabella, The Wise Goose, and convinced Charles E. "Chubb" Howe owner of Winslow Press to publish it. Revived from folklore, Isabella was a large white goose with a sun-bright yellow beak, able to lay golden eggs whenever she had a mind. Supporting characters such as Mr. Sun, Miss True Blue, the Happies, and Lady Daffodil shared Isabella's land of make-believe. The book was well received by critics of the day. Favorable reviews appeared in The Horn Book Magazine, The New York Times, and The Boston Herald. But little did anyone know that soon Emilie Blackmore Stapp and her irrepressible goose, Isabella would be destined for much greater things than simply literary success.

== World War II ==
On October 28, 1942, in an effort to raise money for the war effort, the United States Treasury Department and the Holy Cathedral Book Club of Chicago sponsored an autographed book party. That night, with such dignitaries as Carl Sandburg and Alvin C. York in attendance, a copy of Isabella, The Wise Goose sold for $800. Along with Isabella and other books, an original Abraham Lincoln letter and an autographed Rudyard Kipling book, sold to raise $283,000 in war bonds and stamps.

Soon after, Emilie and her mythical goose, Isabella, were commissioned by the United States Government to sell war bonds. Isabella's Victory Flight was launched in 1942. Stapp sold Isabella's war bonds through a letter-writing campaign she conducted. Requests to purchase the war bonds were sent on stationery with a reproduction of Isabella created by renowned illustrator and artist, Forrest W. Orr. The letters listed Stapp's address as Isabella's Victory Flight Headquarters, The Dolls' House, Wiggins, Mississippi.

Emilie Stapp and Isabella took part in four Victory Bond drives. Stapp achieved her highest single-campaign sales during the 8th Victory Bond campaign, raising an impressive $710,403. Collectively, Emilie Blackmore Stapp and her character, Isabella the Wise Goose, raised $3,339,429 to support the American war effort. This achievement is especially remarkable considering that $1 in 1942 had roughly the same purchasing power as $18.44 in 2025. Adjusted for today's dollars, Emilie Blackmore Stapp's fundraising efforts would equal an astounding $61,592,583, all accomplished from her rural home in the small town of Wiggins, Mississippi.

== Later life and death ==
After her successful war bond campaign, Emilie Blackmore Stapp continued to expand on the story of Isabella, by penning her second, third and fourth books in the series. In 1946, she wrote Isabella's Big Secret which told of the goose's exploits during World War II. In 1947, Stapp wrote Isabella the Bride which tells of her marriage to Alexander, The King of Gooseland and in 1948, she followed up with Isabella, Queen of Gooseland.

By 1949, Emilie Stapp had become frustrated with the lack of promotion by her publisher, Charles "Chubb" Howe. On May 4, 1949, she wrote to Howe, saying: "We are sure you realize that books, no matter how delightful we think they are, will not sell themselves without publicity. I am most eager to know what your plans really are, Chubb, to publicize these books." Howe took the letter to heart and responded by personally creating a publicity campaign aimed at department stores, public libraries and public schools across the country. Soon brisk sales ensued and the fifth book in the series, Isabella's Goose Village was released in 1950. Emilie Blackmore Stapp dedicated the sixth and last book in the series, Isabella's New Friend, published in 1952, to Charles E. Howe and his wife Esther, because of Howe's efforts in successfully promoting the Isabella series. The dedication read: "To Chubb and Esther, With Feathers In Their Caps. From Isabella."

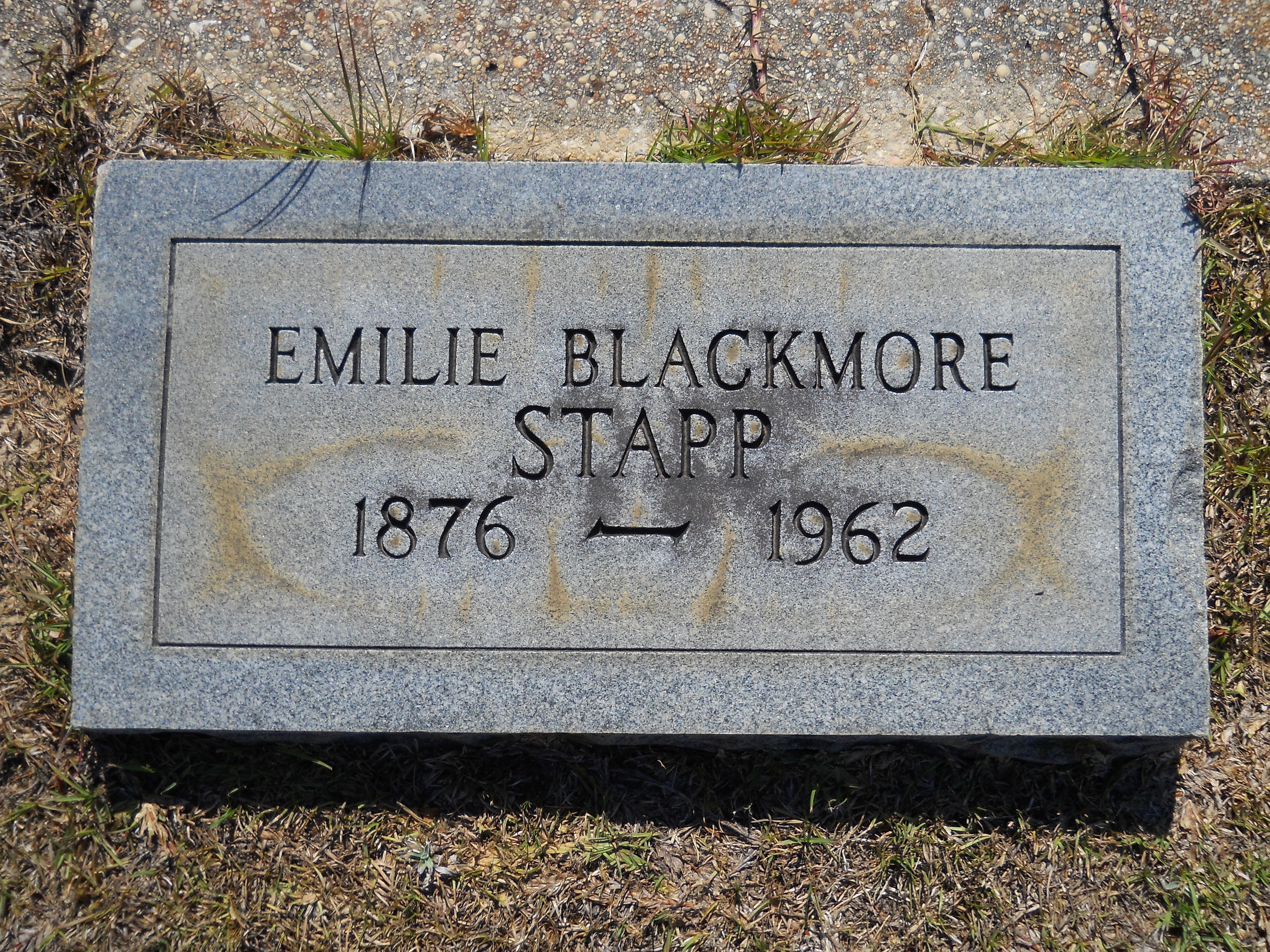
Emilie Blackmore Stapp headstone in Woodlawn Cemetery, Wiggins, Mississippi

In the mid-1950s, Emilie Stapp's writing career came to an end when she broke her hip in an accident. Holding true to the teachings of her Christian Science faith, she refused all medical treatment. In constant pain, Stapp was confined to her bed for the next seven years of her life until dying from complications of the broken hip in 1962, just five days short of her 86th birthday. Her final resting place is next to her sister Marie Graham Stapp in their family plot at Woodlawn Cemetery, Wiggins, Mississippi.

Because Emilie Stapp and her sister Marie never had the opportunity to go to college themselves, they helped a number of young people reach the goal of obtaining a college degree by paying fully for their educations. Among them were Robert Sherwood and David Miller of Des Moines, Iowa and Ethel Evans of Wiggins, Mississippi. Miller became a successful attorney in Des Moines and Sherwood a successful businessman. Evans, whose mother was the housekeeper for the Stapp sisters, attended Tuskegee Institute in Alabama where she earned a degree in art.

Emilie Blackmore Stapp's altruistic life was the ultimate personification of the Go Hawk Tribe motto, "To Make The World A Better Place." She proved that one person can make a difference. Through her quiet lifelong benevolent works and extraordinary actions in World War I and World War II, she improved the lives of thousands of adults and children without selfishly seeking fame, accolades or notoriety for herself.

== Bibliography ==
- Bread and 'Lasses Sketches of Child Life (1902) Published by The George A. Miller Company, Illustrations by P.J. Monahan

The Go-Hawk Series:

- The Trail of the Go-Hawks (1908) David McKay Publisher, Illustrations by Harriett Macy
- Uncle Peter-Heathen (1912) David McKay Publisher, Illustrations by Harriett Macy
- The Squaw Lady (1913) David McKay Publisher, Illustrations by Harriett Macy

Unserialized Books

- Little Billy Bowlegs (1916) Published by The George H. Doran Company, Illustrations by Harold Sichel
- Happyland's Fairy Grotto Plays for Children (1922) Published by Houghton Mifflin Company, (Not Illustrated)
- Little Streets of Beacon Hill (1928) Published by J.F. Olsson Company, Illustrations by Jeanette Stewart
- Penny Wise (1935) Published By Winslow Press, Illustrations by Forrest W. Orr

The Isabella Series:

- Isabella, The Wise Goose (1940) Published by Winslow Press, Illustrations by Forrest W. Orr
- Isabella's Big Secret (1946) Published by Winslow Press, Illustrations by Forrest W. Orr
- Isabella, The Bride (1947) Published by Winslow Press, Illustrations by Forrest W. Orr
- Isabella, Queen of Gooseland (1948) Published by Winslow Press, Illustrations by Forrest W. Orr
- Isabella's Goose Village (1950) Published by Winslow Press, Illustrations by Forrest W. Orr
- Isabella's New Friend (1952) Published by Winslow Press, Illustrations by Forrest W. Orr
