= Texas, Mississippi =

- Unincorporated community
- Nickname: Stump Texas
- Location within the state of Mississippi
- Coordinates: 30°53′10″N 89°16′19″W
- Country: United States
- State: Mississippi
- County: Stone
- Elevation: 230 ft (70 m)
- Time zone: UTC-6 (Central (CST))
  - Summer (DST): UTC-5 (CDT)
- ZIP code: 39455
- Area code: Area code 601
- GNIS feature ID: 694958

Texas, also known as Stump Texas, is an unincorporated community in Stone County, Mississippi, United States. The community was named after the U.S. state of Texas.

The Red Creek flows north of Texas.

Fairley Cemetery is located in Texas.
