= Sweetbay Bogs Preserve =

Preserve established in 1989 by the Mississippi Chapter of the Nature Conservancy

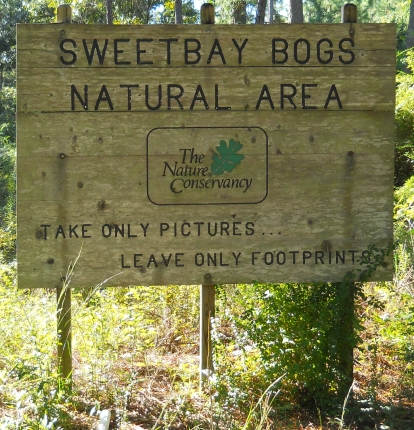
- Entrance at Sweetbay Bogs Preserve

- Location within Mississippi
- Location: Stone County, Mississippi, Mississippi, United States
- Coordinates: 30°49′26″N 89°17′05″W
- Area: 194 acres (79 ha)
- Established: 1989

Sweetbay Bogs Preserve was established in 1989 by the Mississippi Chapter of the Nature Conservancy. Located in the western portion of Stone County, Mississippi, the property contains a classic example of a hillside seepage bog which the Conservancy designated as Sweetbay Bogs Preserve because of the multitude of sweetbay (Magnolia virginiana) trees that occupy the site. The Preserve contains 194 acres (78 hectares) near Red Creek, within the Pascagoula River watershed.

== Ecology ==
Because they provide habitat for a number of rare plant species, bogs are considered to be critical natural communities in the longleaf pine (Pinus palustris) ecosystem, which once covered most of the Gulf Coastal Plain in the southeastern United States. Bogs, that are associated with longleaf pine ecosystems, are also known as Pocosins. Some of the rare plants, that have been identified in the Sweetbay Bogs Preserve, include:

- Bog spicebush (Lindera subcoriacea)
- Coast sedge (Carex exilis)
- Flame flower (Macranthera flammea)
- Grass of Parnassus (Parnassia)
- Harper's yellow-eyed grass (Xyris scabrifolia)
- Large beakrush (Rhynchospora macra)
- Pineland bog button (Lachnocaulon digynum)
- Southern butterwort (Pinguicula primuliflora)

In addition, the Preserve contains typical bog plants, such as sundews (Drosera), butterworts (Pinguicula), bladderworts (Utricularia) and pitcher plants (Sarracenia). The area is also home to rare gopher tortoises (Gopherus polyphemus).

== Management ==
The Nature Conservancy uses periodic prescribed burning on the site to restrict growth of competing plant species while encouraging flowering and seed production of native bog plants. Land use activity around the Preserve is restricted so that water flow patterns and water storage capacity are maintained to insure survival of the habitat.
