= Red Creek Wildlife Management Area (Mississippi) =

Protected area in Mississippi, United States

- IUCN category IV (habitat/species management area)
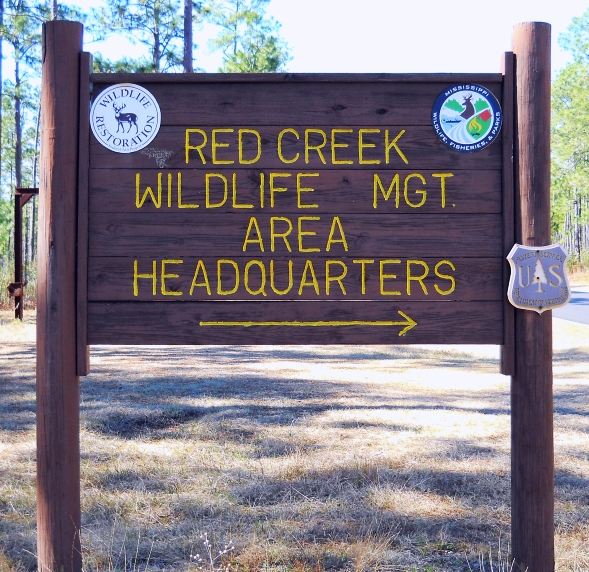
- Location sign

- Location within Mississippi Location within the United States
- Location: Stone, George and Jackson counties, Mississippi, United States
- Nearest city: Wiggins, Mississippi
- Coordinates: 30°43′49″N 88°55′23″W
- Area: 22,954 acres (92.9 km^{2})
- Governing body: Mississippi Department of Wildlife, Fisheries and Parks
- Website: Red Creek WMA website

Red Creek Wildlife Management Area was established from land owned by the U.S. Forest Service and is located within the De Soto National Forest off Mississippi Highway 15. Red Creek WMA lies within Stone, George, and Jackson Counties, southeast of Wiggins, Mississippi, and contains approximately 23,000 acres (93 km^{2}).

== Use permits and regulations ==
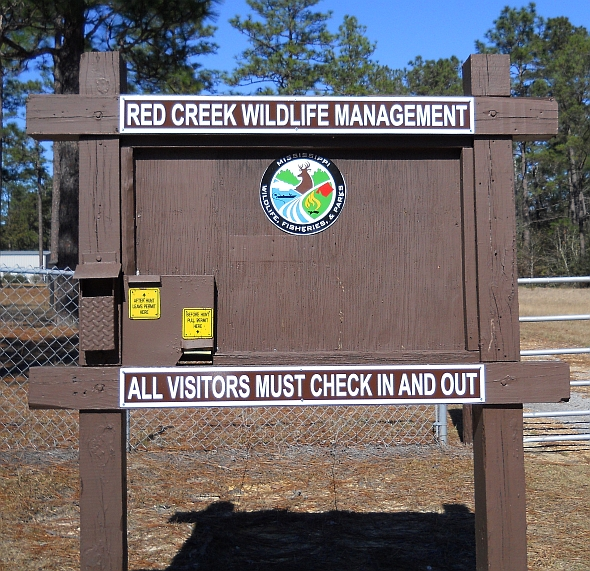
Check Station

Wildlife Management Area User Permits are required for persons engaged in hunting, fishing or trapping. Camping and the use of horses and off-road vehicles are governed by U.S. Forest Service regulations.

== Game animals ==
The principal game animals that can be legally harvested on the WMA, in accordance with State hunting regulations, include whitetail deer, wild turkey, gray squirrel, fox squirrel, rabbit, raccoon, opossum, and bobcat. Wild hogs may be hunted as nuisance animals but only during open hunting seasons. On rare occasion, a black bear may be seen on the WMA, but hunting or disturbance of bears is prohibited.

== Habitat ==
Longleaf-slash pine is the dominant forest cover type on Red Creek WMA. Associated tree species include loblolly and shortleaf pines, oaks, gums (blackgum and sweetgum), and flowering dogwood. Associated shrubs and ground vegetation include gallberry, yaupon, wax-myrtle, sumac, blackberry, saw palmetto, and broomsedge.

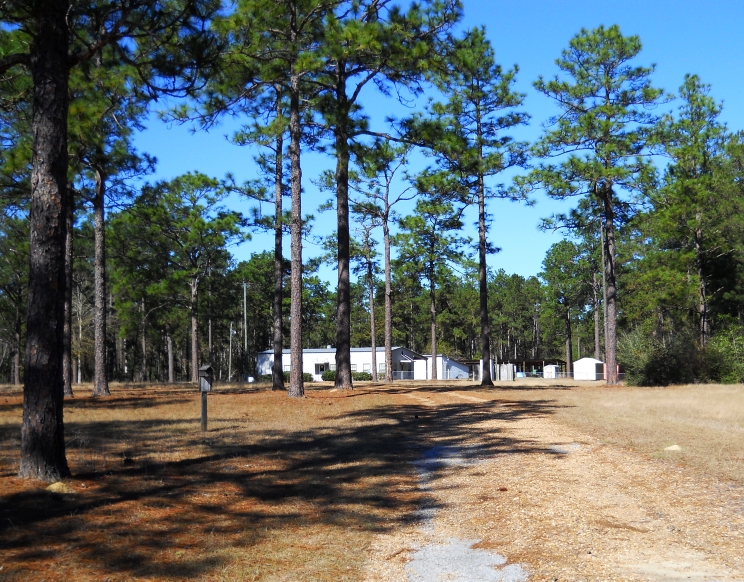
Headquarters Complex
