= Finkbine-Guild Lumber Company =

American lumber company in Mississippi, 1901–1927

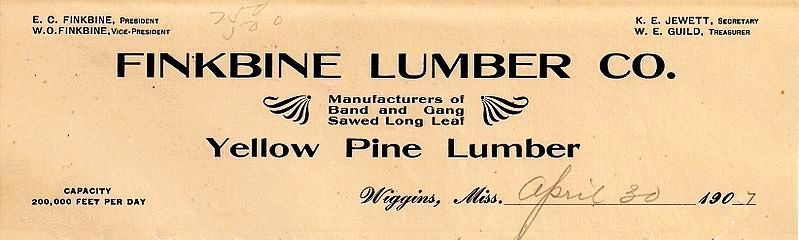
- Finkbine Lumber Company letterhead (1907)
- Founded: 1901
- Founder: W.O. Finkbine, E.C. Finkbine, W.E. Guild
- Defunct: 1927
- Successor: Wilbe Lumber Company
- Headquarters: Wiggins, Mississippi; Jackson, Mississippi
- Products: Longleaf pine
- Subsidiaries: Mississippi Farms Company; American Pickle and Canning Company

The Finkbine-Guild Lumber Company was established to harvest and market the virgin longleaf pine (Pinus palustris L.) stands of southern Mississippi during the early 20th century. The main sawmills were located in Wiggins and D'Lo, Mississippi. When the local timber supply dwindled, the company tried to utilize redwood trees from California, but that operation failed because of high transportation costs. Other attempts were made at promoting a more diversified use of the cutover timberlands; some ventures were successful while others were not.

== History ==
=== The longleaf pine resource ===
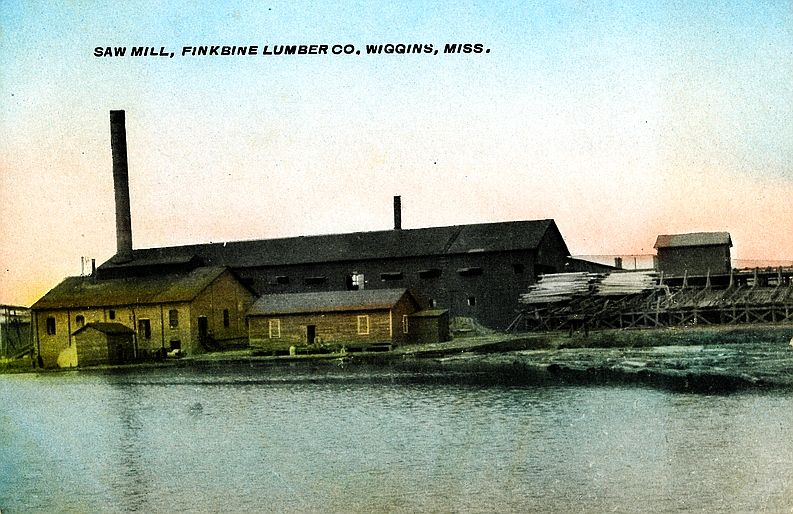
Finkbine Lumber Company sawmill, Wiggins, Mississippi, circa 1920

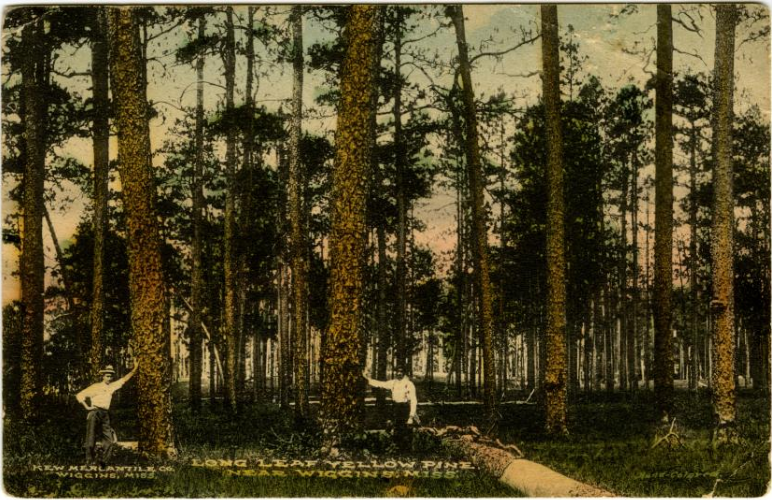
Virgin longleaf pines near Wiggins, MS, c. 1900

Up until the 20th century, the virgin pine forests of south Mississippi were virtually untouched by man, because there was no efficient system for transporting cut logs from the forests to sawmills for conversion to lumber. There was an immense expanse of longleaf pine, stretching from Virginia, southwest through nine U.S. States, ending in east Texas, and covering more than 140,000 square miles (363,000 square kilometers). Longleaf pine was the major species of interest to southern lumbermen due to its straightness and durability from a high resin content.

=== Railroad development ===
A few sawmills were located along the Mississippi Gulf Coast, near the mouths of rivers and streams, which were used for rafting logs to the mills. Because of limited inland waterways for moving logs, vast timberlands remained inaccessible to lumbermen.

The river system of transporting logs to sawmills in south Mississippi ended in the late 19th century, when the Gulf and Ship Island Railroad (G&SIRR) was constructed. The main line of the G&SIRR extended 160 miles (257 kilometers) from Gulfport, north and northwest to Jackson the State capital. The G&SIRR began operation from Gulfport to Hattiesburg in 1897, with the extension from Hattiesburg to Jackson in 1900. The G&SIRR passed through the town of Wiggins located halfway between Gulfport and Hattiesburg. As a result of the growing timber industry, Wiggins had developed as a sawmill town.

== Company establishment and growth ==
Two millionaire businessmen from Des Moines, Iowa, brothers W.O. and E.C. Finkbine, learned of considerable wealth in the form of timber, minerals, sand, and gravel located in the northern section of Harrison County (now Stone County). They owned the Green Bay Lumber Company, along with lumberyards throughout Iowa. The brothers also owned a 17,000-acre (6,900 ha) wheat farm in Canada. But the main selling point in Mississippi was the vast acreage of virgin southern yellow pine timber.

Officers of the Finkbine Lumber Company were E. C. Finkbine, (president), W. O. Finkbine (vice president), and W. E. Guild (treasurer). In 1901, they purchased two sawmills owned by the Niles City Lumber Company in Wiggins, Mississippi. In 1903, W. E. Guild became general manager of the Wiggins sawmills, and Finkbine Lumber Company acquired all of Niles City Lumber Company's timberlands. Within Stone County, the Finkbine Lumber Company owned approximately 25,000 acres (10,000 ha) of timberland.

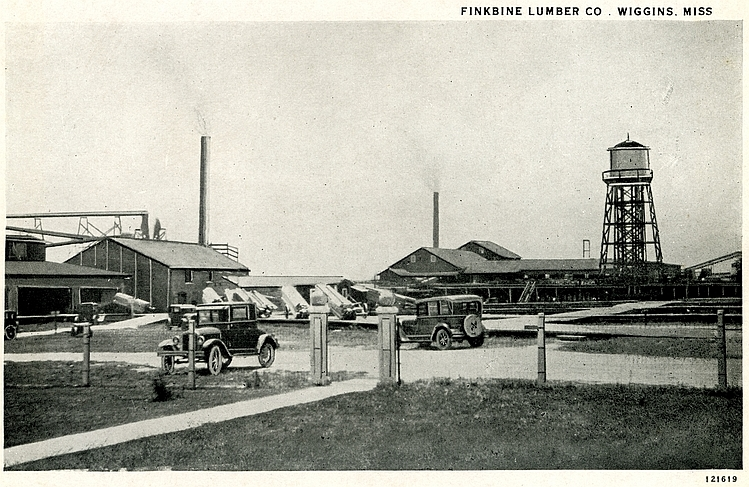
Finkbine Lumber Company sawmill, Wiggins, Mississippi, circa 1920

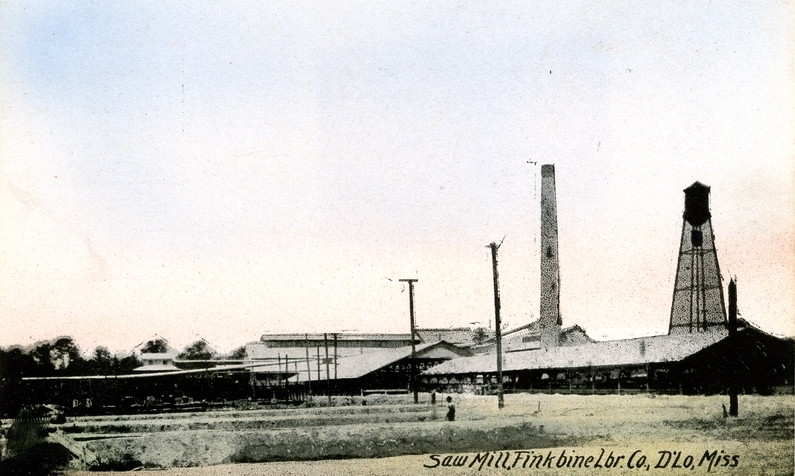
Finkbine Lumber Company sawmill, D'Lo, Mississippi, circa 1920

In 1903, Finkbine Lumber Company completed construction of a new double-band sawmill at Wiggins. The new mill was able to produce 125,000 board feet of lumber per day. It had five dry kilns, a large planing mill and a shed for storing finished lumber. The mill sawed longleaf pine logs into dimensional lumber and construction timbers. Finkbine Lumber Company conducted business in both domestic and export markets. The shipping port in Gulfport, Mississippi served as their export hub.

A large company store was built in Wiggins to enhance Finkbine's business. The store was operated under the name of the Kew Mercantile Company and served Finkbine Lumber Company employees and the community at large.

In 1914, the company established the town of Finkbine west of the village of Johns in southern Rankin County, Mississippi. Complete with a school, church, YMCA, barber shop, post office, and doctor's office, Finkbine served as a "company town" for workers from 1919 to 1920, and was relocated southeast of Johns to be closer to the company's operations, where it remained until operations ceased in 1927.

=== Peak years ===
At some point in time, the name was changed to Finkbine-Guild Lumber Company. In 1915, the Finkbine-Guild Lumber Company began construction of an all-electric sawmill at the town of D'Lo in Simpson County, Mississippi. When operations began in 1916, the D'Lo sawmill had a cutting capacity of 200,000 board feet every 10 hours. Logs for the D'Lo sawmill were derived from Simpson, Rankin, Smith, and Scott counties in Mississippi. In 1918, Finkbine-Guild moved their offices from Wiggins to Jackson, Mississippi.

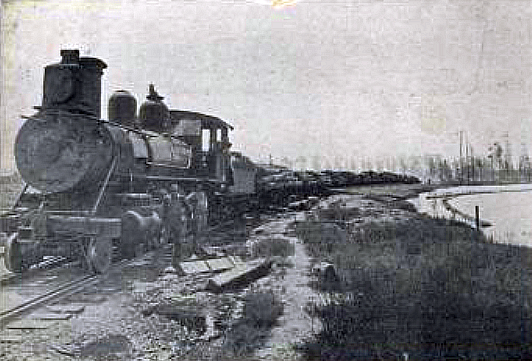
Finkbine Lumber Company log train, Wiggins, Mississippi, circa 1910

To facilitate harvesting, Finkbine-Guild Lumber Company constructed their own rail lines, often called dummy lines, into their timberlands. One of their forest railroads extended 24 miles (39 kilometers) southeast from Wiggins. The Finkbine-Guild Lumber Company used a Clyde steam skidder which could pull in all logs on 4 acres (1.6 hectares) at one setting, and each pull could bring in 5 to 15 logs to the dummy rail line for loading. At peak production, Finkbine-Guild operated 5 locomotives out of Wiggins and D'Lo. But, the use of steam skidders resulted in complete destruction of young trees, leaving a bare, open landscape.

=== West coast experiment ===
As their timberlands were being exhausted in Mississippi, the Finkbine-Guild Lumber Company devised a plan to use their Mississippi mills as finishing plants for redwood timber from California. In 1925, Finkbine-Guild bought the Cottoneva Lumber Company of Rockport, California near the Pacific Ocean. Because of the remote location, it became necessary for Finkbine-Guild to build houses, a company store, dining facilities, a school, a hotel, a barber shop, and a hospital. The company also constructed a sawmill, logging railroads, and a steam-powered cable system for transferring logs from shore to ships. The Rockport mill produced only cants – squared-off logs for shipment to Mississippi mills for final processing.

In San Francisco Bay near the city of Sausalito, California, Finkbine-Guild invested heavily in construction of a dock and loading facility. The company owned five oil-burning ships, called The Redwood Line, that transported the logs from San Francisco Bay through the Panama Canal to Gulfport, Mississippi. The ships were unloaded at Gulfport, and logs were transferred onto railroad flatcars for transportation north to the Finkbine mills in Wiggins or D'Lo, where the redwood was processed into finished lumber.

Numerous hardships – broken turbines, broken cable lines, bad weather, blocked roads, problems in obtaining supplies, and labor issues – plagued the company at the Rockport facility. Consequently, after only two years of operation in California, the Finkbine-Guild Lumber Company folded. In 1928, all California lands owned by Finkbine-Guild were sold to Southern Redwood Company. The Finkbine-Guild experiment in California failed because the Company bore extra handling costs, transporting logs to Mississippi, whereas other redwood companies processed their timber locally.

=== Alternative ventures ===
By 1927, the supply of virgin pine in Mississippi was depleted, and no more redwood logs were being shipped to the Mississippi sawmills for processing. On July 1, 1929, the Finkbine-Guild sawmills and remaining timberlands at Wiggins and D'Lo were sold to the Wilbe Lumber Company.

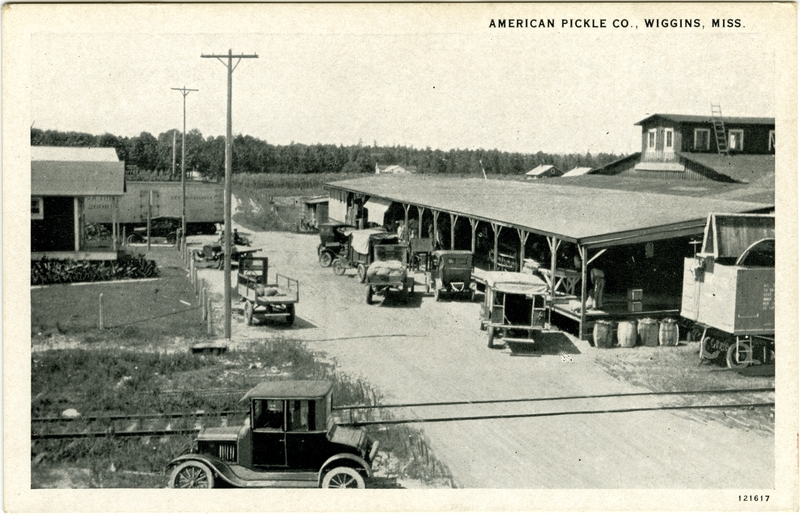
American Pickle and Canning Company, Wiggins, Mississippi, circa 1910

In an attempt to market their cutover timberland in south Mississippi, Finkbine-Guild Lumber Company organized the Mississippi Farms Company. The Farms Company advertised the cutover timberland for sale to entice Slavs and Poles from the northern U.S. to move to Mississippi and buy land along the Finkbine-Guild logging roads. However, clearing the land of stumps and attempting to grow farm crops in the thin soils was hard work, leading to failure during the long, hot summers.

One successful venture of Finkbine-Guild and Mississippi Farms Company was the construction of a factory in Wiggins for processing farm produce. The American Pickle and Canning Company was formed to operate what became known as the ‘pickle factory'. At first, the plant processed pickles, tomatoes, beans, and sweet potatoes, but within a few years, pickles became its sole product. At one time, it was the largest pickle processing plant in the world. Through time, the pickle factory changed ownership, becoming a part of Brown-Miller Company, then Beatrice Foods. Those larger food-processing companies consolidated their production at locations in other U.S. States, and the Wiggins pickle factory closed in 1983, ending the final legacy of the Finkbine-Guild era.

== See also ==
- L.N. Dantzler Lumber Company
- Fernwood Lumber Company
- Great Southern Lumber Company
- Gulf and Ship Island Railroad
