= Clayton Rand =

American journalist

- Born: May 25, 1891; Onalaska, Wisconsin, U.S.
- Died: February 26, 1971 (aged 79); Gulfport, Mississippi, U.S.
- Resting place: Evergreen Cemetery, Gulfport, Mississippi, U.S.
- Education: Mississippi State University; Harvard Law School
- Occupation(s): Columnist, author, publisher
- Spouse: Ella May Smylie
- Children: 1 son

Clayton Rand (May 25, 1891 - February 26, 1971) was an American columnist, writer, publisher, and public speaker. He was the publisher of the Dixie Press and the Dixie Guide in Gulfport, Mississippi, and he (co-)authored six books.

== Life ==
Rand was born on May 25, 1891, in Onalaska, Wisconsin. He grew up in Bond, Mississippi, and graduated from Mississippi State University and Harvard Law School.

Rand began his career in journalism in 1918 in Philadelphia, Mississippi, where he invested in The Neshoba Democrat. In 1925, he moved to Gulfport, Mississippi, and he purchased the Dixie Press and founded the Dixie Guide. Rand was the president of the Mississippi Press Association, and he (co-)authored six books. He was also a syndicated columnist, and "a popular conservative public speaker."

Rand married Ella May Smylie, and they had a son, Tom. He died on February 26, 1971, in Gulfport, Mississippi, at age 79, and he was buried in Evergreen Cemetery.

== Selected works ==
- Rand, Clayton (1936). Abracadabra: or, One Democrat to Another. Newark, Delaware: The Press of Kells. OCLC 702302477.
- Rand, Clayton (1940). Ink On My Hands. New York: Carrick & Evans. OCLC 1374427.
- Rand, Clayton (1940). Men of Spine in Mississippi. Gulfport, Mississippi: Dixie Press. OCLC 866197883.
- Rand, Clayton. Sparks in the Eyes.
- Rand, Clayton; Smitley, Robert (1958). The World Is Mine: Apollonius Philosopher and Financier. New York: Fleet Publishing Corporation. OCLC 937428684.
- Rand, Clayton (1961). Sons of the South: Portraits by Dalton Shourds, Harry Coughlin, Constance Joan Narr. New York: The Fairfax Press. ISBN 9780517262979. OCLC 995491261.
