= Perkinston, Mississippi =

- Unincorporated community
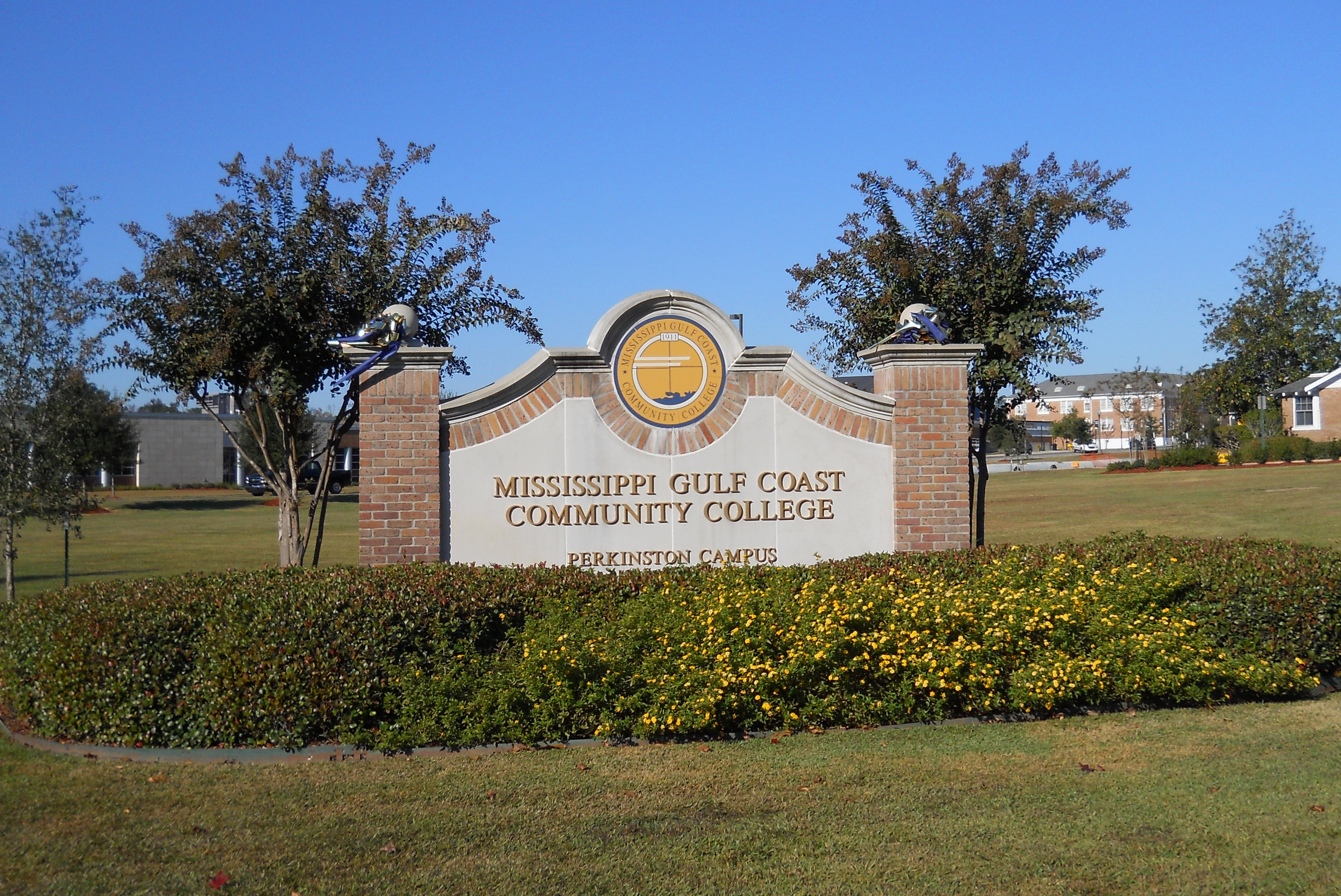
- The main campus of Mississippi Gulf Coast Community College is located in Perkinston.

- Location within Mississippi Location within the United States
- Coordinates: 30°46′56″N 89°8′17″W
- Country: United States
- State: Mississippi
- County: Stone
- Elevation: 135 ft (41 m)
- Time zone: UTC-6 (Central (CST))
  - Summer (DST): UTC-5 (CDT)
- ZIP code: 39573
- Area code: Area code 601
- GNIS feature ID: 675617

Perkinston is an unincorporated community in central Stone County, Mississippi, United States. It is situated along U.S. Highway 49, approximately five miles south of Wiggins. The community is part of the Gulfport–Biloxi, Mississippi Metropolitan Statistical Area.

== History ==
Established in 1880, Perkinston is the oldest settlement in Stone County. The village is named for John C. Perkins (1840–1928), who homesteaded the area after serving in the Confederate Army.

Abundant forests established timber and turpentine production as early industries.

The Perkinston community benefited from the Gulf and Ship Island Railroad, which was constructed through the village in the late 1890s. Beginning in 1911, Perkinston served mainly as a campus for the Harrison County Agricultural High School, which developed into Mississippi Gulf Coast Community College. Through time, the village had few commercial establishments, but did have a post office, general store, churches, and a gasoline service station.

The WLOX TV Tower in Perkinston, a 1,319 ft (402 m) guyed mast tower, is listed as one of the tallest structures in the United States by height.

In 2005, a 250-acre (100 ha) ATV park opened west of Perkinston.

== Education ==
- The Perkinston community is served by the Stone County School District.
- The main campus of Mississippi Gulf Coast Community College is located in Perkinston.

== Transportation ==
- Highway: U.S. Route 49.
- Railroad: Kansas City Southern Railroad.

== Notable people ==
- Mary S. Graham, academic administrator
- Howard Pollock, former member of the United States House of Representatives
