= Darryl Tillman =

American football player (born 1967)

Profile
- Position: Wide receiver

Personal information
- Born: April 27, 1967 (age 59); Wiggins, Mississippi, U.S.
- Listed height: 6 ft 1 in (1.85 m)
- Listed weight: 195 lb (88 kg)

Career information
- College: Southern Mississippi

Career history
- New Orleans Night (1992); Dallas Texans (1993); Las Vegas Sting (1994–1995)

Career AFL statistics
- Receptions: 138
- Receiving yards: 1,916
- Receiving touchdowns: 29
- Stats at ArenaFan.com

Darryl Tillman (born April 27, 1967) is an American former football wide receiver in the Arena Football League. He played for the New Orleans Night, Dallas Texans and Las Vegas Sting. Tillman played college football at Southern Mississippi.
