= Red Creek (Mississippi) =

Creek in Mississippi, USA

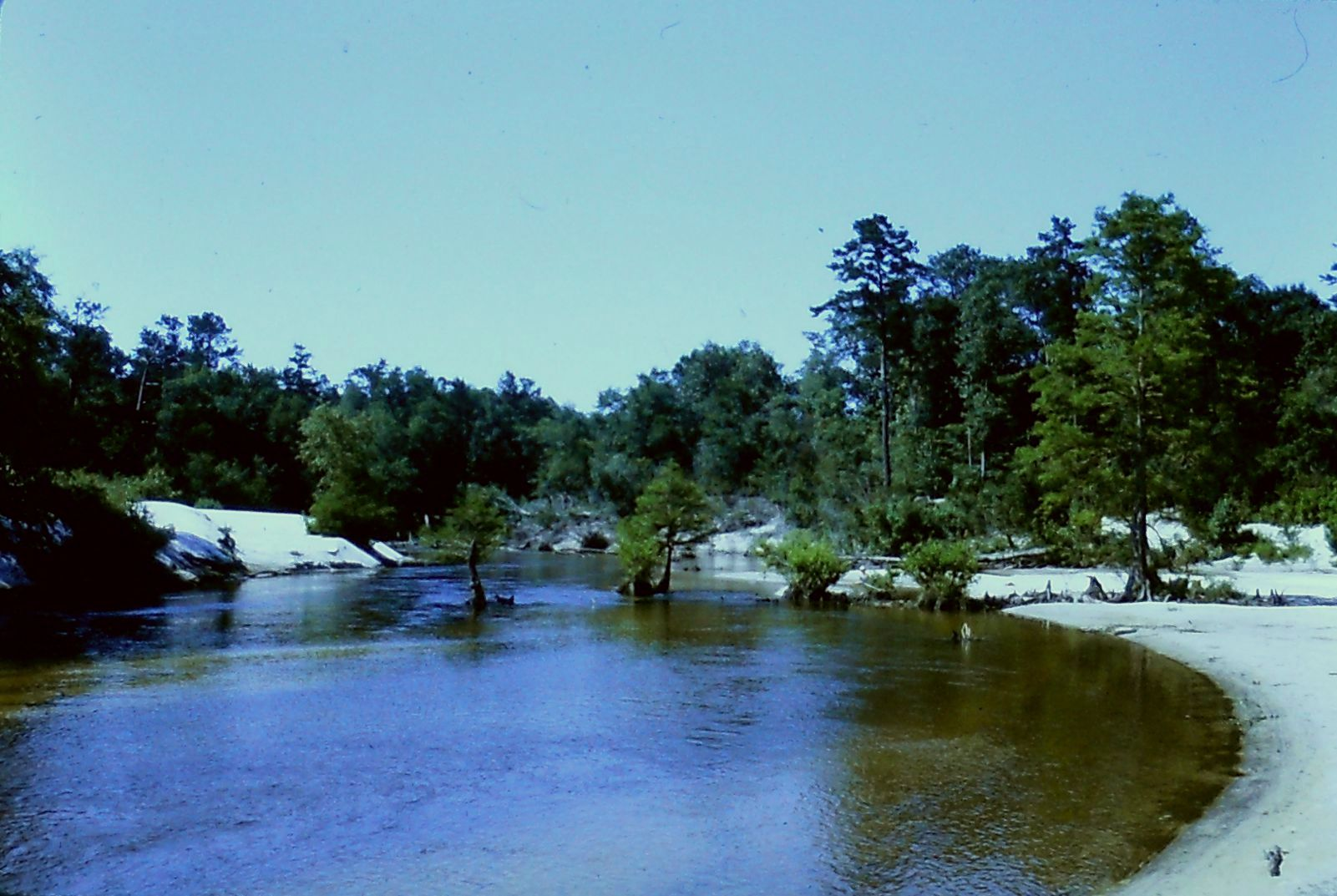
- View of Red Creek and sandbars

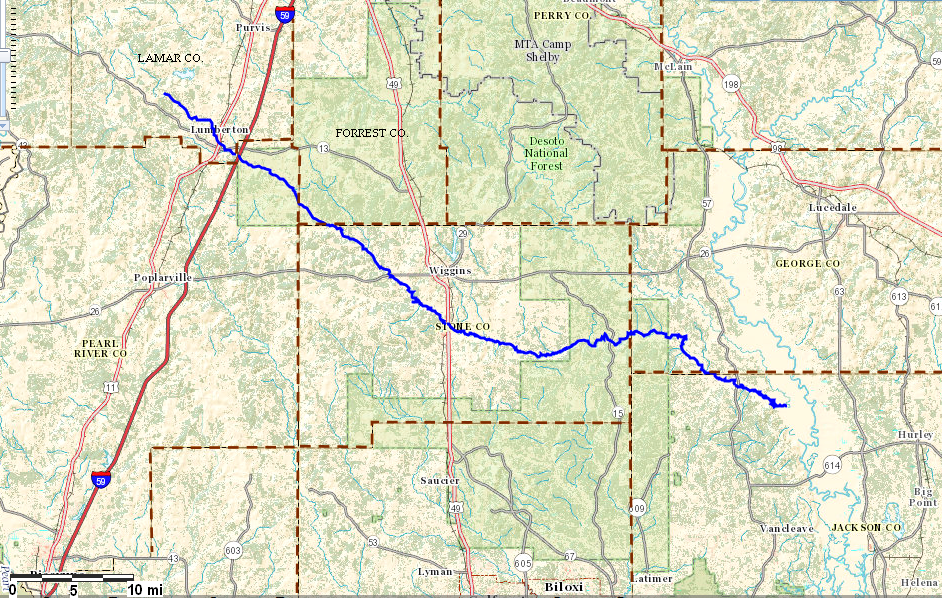
- Red Creek meanders through six counties in south Mississippi

Location
- Country: United States
- State: Mississippi

Physical characteristics
- Source
  - location: Lamar County, Mississippi, United States
  - coordinates: 31°03′42″N 89°31′38″W
  - elevation: 370 ft (110 m)
- Mouth
  - location: Black Creek, Jackson County, Mississippi, United States
  - coordinates: 30°41′46″N 88°40′05″W
  - elevation: 12 ft (3.7 m)
- Length: 80 mi (130 km)

Red Creek is a tributary of the Pascagoula River in the U.S. state of Mississippi. The creek derives its name from naturally occurring tannins that give the water a reddish appearance as it flows over the white sand bottom. A portion of Red Creek has been designated a State Scenic Stream by the Mississippi Legislature.

== Course ==
Red Creek originates in Lamar County and flows southeastward through Pearl River, Forrest, Stone, George, and Jackson counties. In Jackson County, Red Creek converges with Black Creek before flowing into the Pascagoula River. Its total length is approximately 80 miles (130 km).

That portion of Red Creek, from Mississippi Highway 26, west of Wiggins, to its convergence with Black Creek, is a public waterway and a designated scenic stream with a 100-ft (30-m) wide, heavily wooded riparian zone.

Red Creek flows through sections of De Soto National Forest in the southwest corner of Forrest County, the northeast corner of Pearl River County, the eastern edge of Stone County, and the southwest corner of George County. Otherwise, the creek is flanked by private property.

== Recreation ==
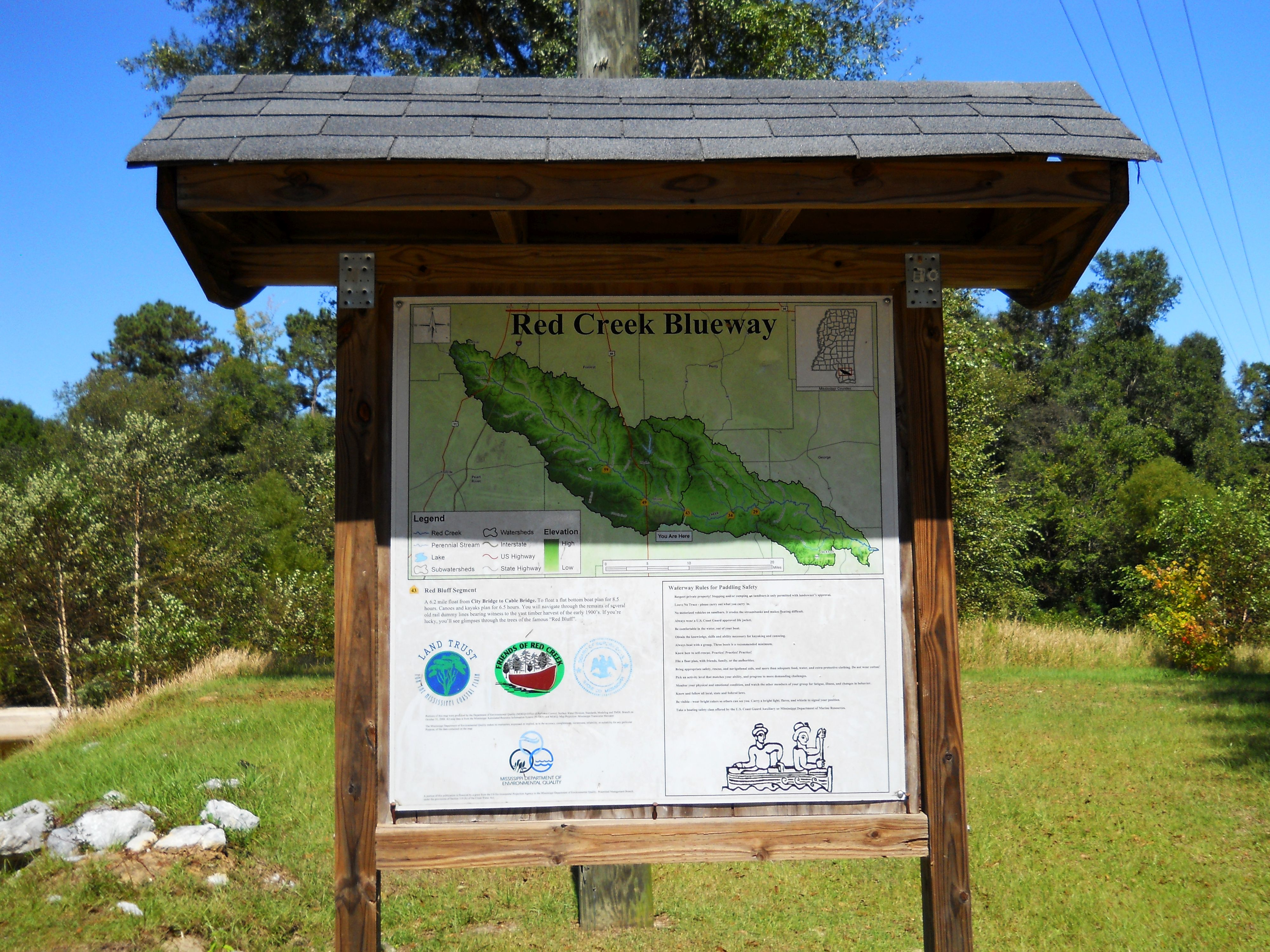
Blueway sign at City Bridge boat landing

Red Creek is a developed blueway with four distinct segments for float trips in Stone County:

- Clay Shelves Segment—This section covers 9.7 miles (15.6 km), between Mississippi Highway 26 and U.S. Route 49.
- Railroad Trestle Segment—A float trip of 6.2 miles (10.0 km), between U.S. Route 49 and City Bridge.
- Red Bluff Segment—The creek meanders 9.6 miles (15.4 km), between City Bridge and Cable Bridge.

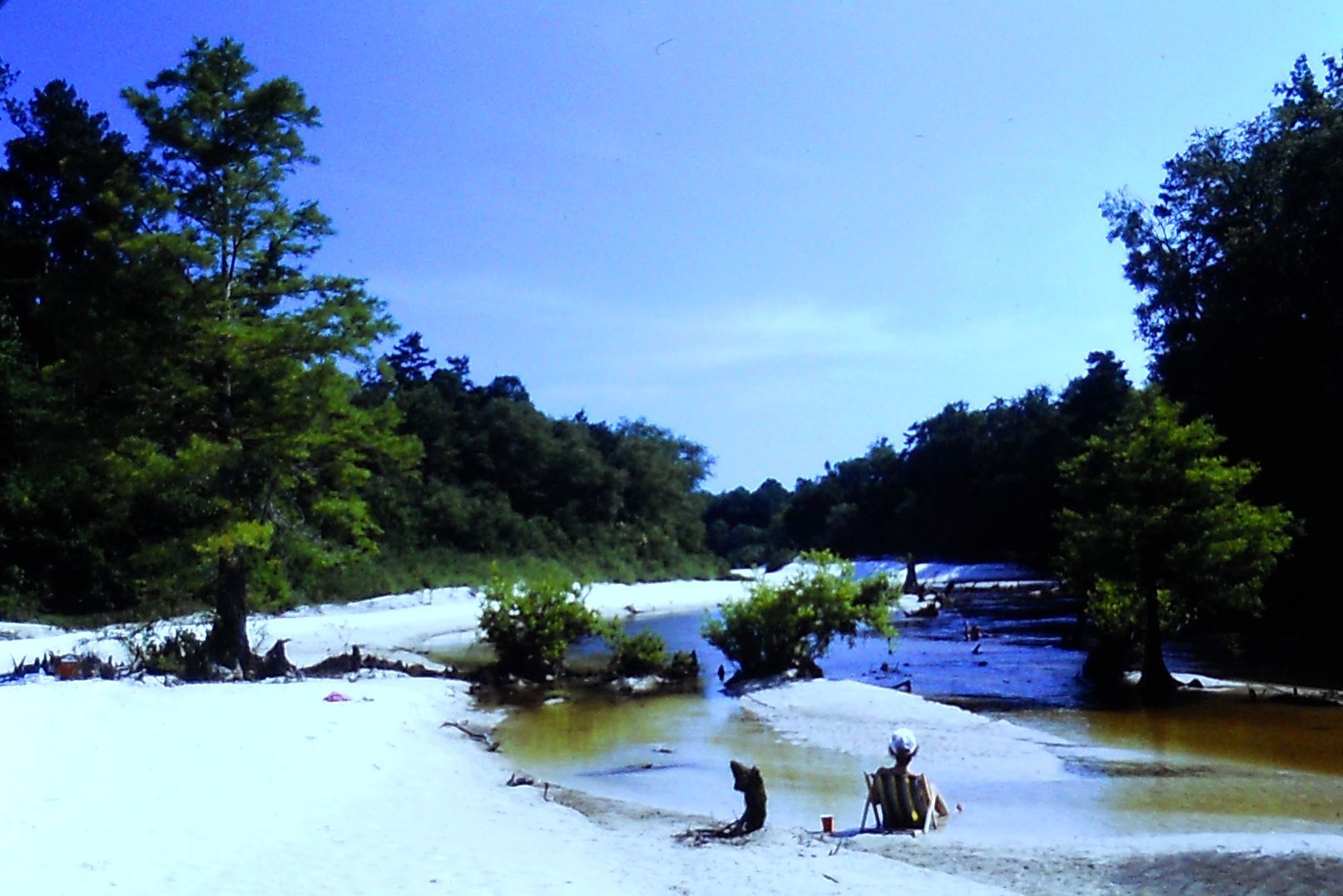
Red Creek channel contains numerous white sand bars during dry seasons

- Natural Springs Segment—The shortest section contains 4.4 miles (7.1 km), between Cable Bridge and Mississippi Highway 15.

Numerous white sandbars are suitable as rest stops, picnic areas, or overnight camp areas.

Sixty-one species of freshwater and diadromous fish have been documented in the creek, and at least five species have value for sport fishing.

In 2004, the Red Creek watershed was 66% forested and encompassed 400 mi^{2} (1,000 km^{2}). Within the watershed, licensed hunting is allowed on De Soto National Forest and Red Creek Wildlife Management Area. Game species such as whitetail deer, squirrel, raccoon, wild turkey, rabbit, and bobwhite quail are found within the watershed.

== See also ==
- List of rivers of Mississippi
