= Mary Margaret Graham =

American former CIA officer

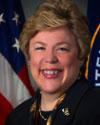

Deputy Director of National Intelligence for Collection
- In office 2005–2008
- President: George W. Bush

Personal details
- Profession: Intelligence Officer

Mary Margaret Graham was the United States Deputy Director of National Intelligence for Collection (2005–2008).

== Background ==
=== Education ===
Graham is a graduate of Marywood College in Scranton, Pennsylvania, and obtained a master's degree in Russian Studies at The Maxwell School of Syracuse University.

=== Honors and awards ===
Graham has earned prestigious honors for her service: National Intelligence Distinguished Service Medal, the Distinguished Career Intelligence Medal, and the Secretary of Defense Meritorious Civilian Service Award, and the Donovan Award in 2001.

== Career ==
In May 2005, Mary Margaret Graham was appointed as Deputy Director of National Intelligence for Collection. In this role, Graham worked on behalf of the Director of National Intelligence to coordinate and integrate the collection efforts of the 15 intelligence agencies and ensures that the DNI priorities are appropriately reflected in future planning and systems acquisition decisions.

Mary Margaret Graham recently served as the Associate Deputy Director for Operations for Counterintelligence at the Central Intelligence Agency. In her 27 years with the CIA, she has had numerous field and headquarters assignments. From 1999 to 2001, Graham served as Chief of the Directorate of Operation's National Resources Division. She also served as the Executive Assistant to William Crowell, then Deputy Director of the National Security Agency.

=== Speeches ===
Graham made headlines when she inadvertently disclosed the size of the national intelligence budget during a speech in San Antonio, Texas on October 31, 2005, according to U.S. News & World Report.

== See also ==
- Director of National Intelligence
