= Sawlog =

Log large enough for sawing into lumber

The term sawlog is a log of suitable size for sawing into lumber, processed at a sawmill. This is in contrast to those other parts of the stem that are designated pulpwood. Sawlogs will be greater in diameter, straighter and have a lower knot frequency.

Sawlogs most often come from the "butt end" of the stem and are the most financially valuable part of the tree.

== See also ==
- Forest
