= Mary S. Graham =

American academic administrator

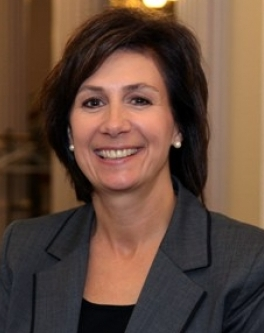
- Graham in 2011

12th president of Mississippi Gulf Coast Community College
- Incumbent
- Assumed office 2011
- Preceded by: Willis H. Lott

Personal details
- Born: Biloxi, Mississippi, U.S.
- Children: 3
- Education: Mississippi Gulf Coast Community College; University of Southern Mississippi

Mary S. Graham is an American academic administrator who has served as the president of Mississippi Gulf Coast Community College (MGCCC) since 2011. She is a former chair of the American Association of Community Colleges and has served as a member of the Mississippi Power board of directors since 2020.

== Early life and education ==
Graham was born in Biloxi, Mississippi, and grew up in Perkinston. She was the youngest of eight children in her family. She attended Mississippi Gulf Coast Community College (MGCCC), where she earned an associate degree. She later pursued her bachelor’s, master’s, and doctoral degrees at the University of Southern Mississippi, completing a Ph.D. in higher education administration.

== Career ==
Graham began her professional career in 1987 at the Jackson County campus of MGCCC, holding administrative roles, including Director of Admissions/Registrar and Director of Institutional Relations. She later became Vice President of the Community Campus and served as Vice President of the Perkinston Campus for 13 years.

In 2011, Graham was appointed as the 12th president of MGCCC by its board of trustees, succeeding Willis H. Lott. As president, she oversaw the expansion of the college, including the development of new campuses and programs. Her leadership included a focus on workforce development, fundraising, and providing scholarship opportunities. In September 2011, she was recognized at the White House as a Champion of Change.

During her presidency, MGCCC was recognized among the top ten percent of community colleges in the United States by the Aspen Institute. She also served as chair of the American Association of Community Colleges, a role representing over 1,200 institutions nationwide. Additionally, she held leadership positions in state and national organizations, including the Mississippi Association of Community Colleges and other boards such as the Gulf Coast Business Council and the National Diabetes and Obesity Research Institute. In November 2020, Graham joined the Mississippi Power board of directors.

== Personal life ==
Mary Graham is married to Wayne Graham, and the couple has three children. Graham is actively involved in community organizations, including church youth programs and Rotary International, where she has supported initiatives such as scholarships and mission trips.
