= Stone County School District =

School district in Mississippi

Address
- 214 Critz Street Wiggins, MS, 39577; United States

District information
- Type: Public
- Grades: K-12
- Established: 1957; 68 years ago
- Superintendent: Boyd West
- Accreditation: Southern Association of Colleges and Schools
- NCES District ID: 2804170

Students and staff
- Enrollment: 2,334 (2020-2021)
- Student–teacher ratio: 13.84

Other information
- Website: stoneschools.org

The Stone County School District is a public school district based in Wiggins, Mississippi (USA). The district's boundaries parallel that of Stone County.

== Schools ==
- Stone High School
- Stone Middle School
- Stone Elementary School
- Perkinston Elementary School

== Demographics ==
=== 2006-07 school year ===
There were a total of 2,803 students enrolled in the Stone County School District during the 2006–2007 school year. The gender makeup of the district was 49% female and 51% male. The racial makeup of the district was 24.40% African American, 74.56% White, 0.39% Hispanic, 0.43% Asian, and 0.21% Native American. 43.6% of the district's students were eligible to receive free lunch.

=== Previous school years ===
School Year	Enrollment	Gender Makeup		Racial Makeup				
School Year	Enrollment	Female	Male	Asian	African American	Hispanic	Native American	White
2005-06	2,748	49%	51%	0.29%	24.27%	0.29%	0.22%	74.93%
2004-05	2,639	50%	50%	0.45%	24.86%	0.30%	0.23%	74.16%
2003-04	2,638	49%	51%	0.27%	24.41%	0.19%	0.15%	74.98%
2002-03	2,626	49%	51%	0.15%	25.02%	0.23%	0.08%	74.52%

== Accountability statistics ==
	2006-07	2005-06	2004-05	2003-04	2002-03	
District Accreditation Status	Accredited	Accredited	Accredited	Accredited	Accredited	
School Performance Classifications
Level 5 (Superior Performing) Schools	0	0	1	0	1	
Level 4 (Exemplary) Schools	1	1	3	2	1	0
Level 3 (Successful) Schools	3	1	1	3	3	
Level 2 (Under Performing) Schools	0	0	0	0	0	
Level 1 (Low Performing) Schools	0	0	0	0	0	
Not Assigned	0	0	0	0	0	

== See also ==
- List of school districts in Mississippi
