= Stone County, Mississippi =

County in Mississippi, United States

- County
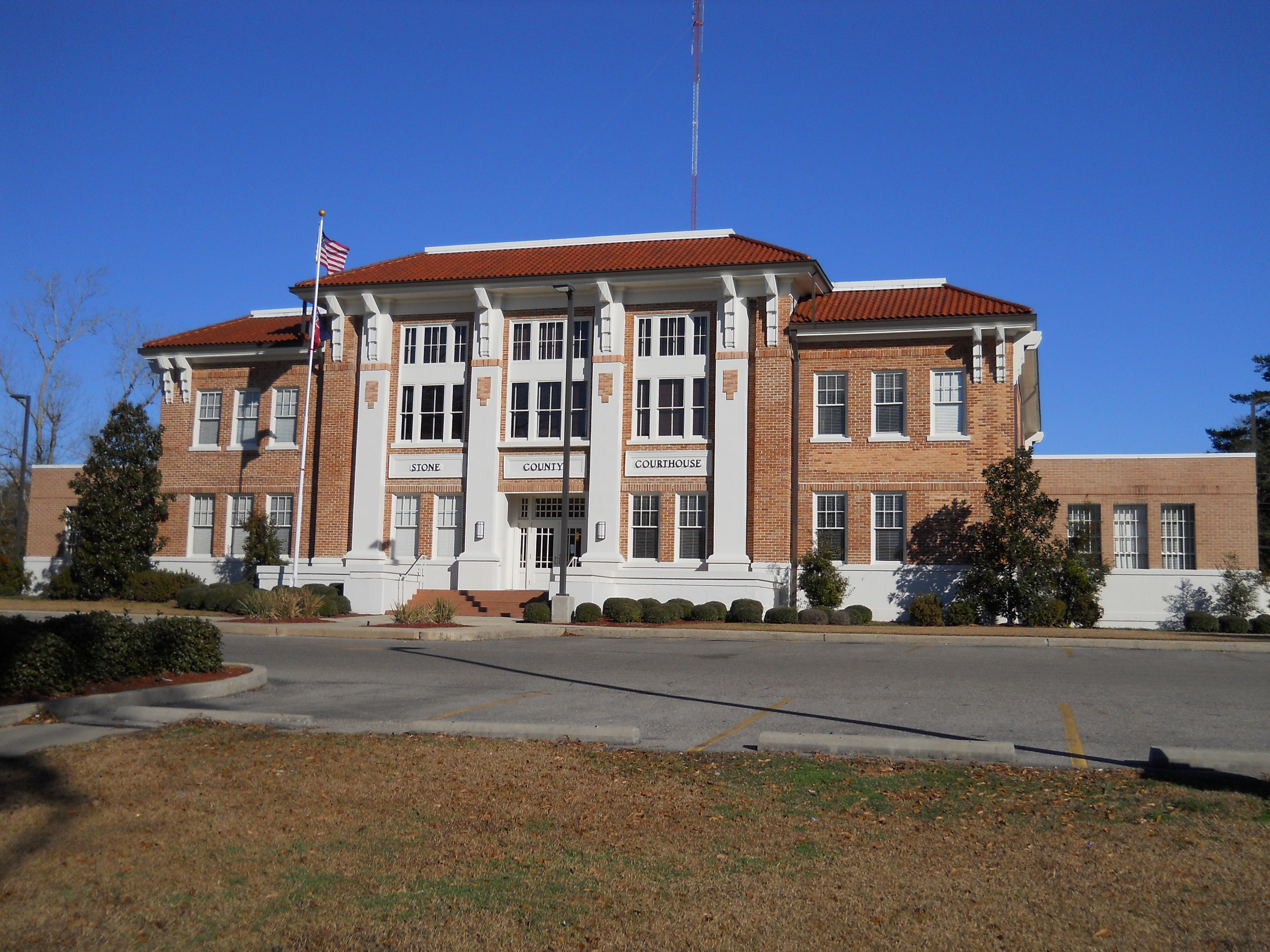
- Stone County Courthouse in Wiggins

- Location within the U.S. state of Mississippi
- Coordinates: 30°47′N 89°07′W
- Country: United States
- State: Mississippi
- Founded: 1916
- Named for: John M. Stone
- Seat: Wiggins
- Largest city: Wiggins

Area
  - Total: 448 sq mi (1,160 km^{2})
  - Land: 445 sq mi (1,150 km^{2})
  - Water: 2.6 sq mi (6.7 km^{2}) 0.6%

Population (2020)
  - Total: 18,333
  - Estimate (2025): 19,654 ▲
  - Density: 41.2/sq mi (15.9/km^{2})
- Time zone: UTC−6 (Central)
  - Summer (DST): UTC−5 (CDT)
- Congressional district: 4th
- Website: www.stonecountyms.gov

Stone County is a county located in the U.S. state of Mississippi. As of the 2020 census, the population was 18,333. Its county seat is Wiggins. Stone County was formed from the northern portion of Harrison County on June 5, 1916. The county was named for John M. Stone, who served as Governor of Mississippi from 1876 to 1882 and again from 1890 to 1896. Stone County is included in the Gulfport-Biloxi, MS Metropolitan Statistical Area. In 1918, the Stone County Courthouse was completed at a cost of $29,515.18, and is still in use today, after several renovations.

== Geography ==
According to the U.S. Census Bureau, the county has a total area of 448 square miles (1,160 km^{2}), of which 445 square miles (1,150 km^{2}) is land and 2.6 square miles (6.7 km^{2}) (0.6%) is water.

=== Major highways ===
- U.S. Highway 49
- Mississippi Highway 15
- Mississippi Highway 26
- Mississippi Highway 29

=== Adjacent counties ===
- Perry County (northeast)
- George County (east)
- Jackson County (southeast)
- Harrison County (south)
- Pearl River County (west)
- Forrest County (northwest)

=== National protected areas ===
- De Soto National Forest (part)
- Sweetbay Bogs Preserve

== Demographics ==
Historical population
Census	Pop.	Note	%±
1920	6,528		—
1930	5,704		−12.6%
1940	6,155		7.9%
1950	6,264		1.8%
1960	7,013		12.0%
1970	8,101		15.5%
1980	9,716		19.9%
1990	10,750		10.6%
2000	13,622		26.7%
2010	17,786		30.6%
2020	18,333		3.1%
2025 (est.)	19,654	▲	7.2%
U.S. Decennial Census; 1790-1960 1900-1990; 1990-2000 2010-2013

=== Racial and ethnic composition ===
Stone County, Mississippi – Racial and ethnic composition Note: the US Census treats Hispanic/Latino as an ethnic category. This table excludes Latinos from the racial categories and assigns them to a separate category. Hispanics/Latinos may be of any race.
Race / Ethnicity (NH = Non-Hispanic)	Pop 1980	Pop 1990	Pop 2000	Pop 2010	Pop 2020	% 1980	% 1990	% 2000	% 2010	% 2020
White alone (NH)	7,430	8,326	10,724	13,820	13,822	76.47%	77.45%	78.73%	77.70%	75.39%
Black or African American alone (NH)	2,162	2,335	2,591	3,395	3,239	22.25%	21.72%	19.02%	19.09%	17.67%
Native American or Alaska Native alone (NH)	13	20	30	86	79	0.13%	0.19%	0.22%	0.48%	0.43%
Asian alone (NH)	20	14	21	57	89	0.21%	0.13%	0.15%	0.32%	0.49%
Native Hawaiian or Pacific Islander alone (NH)	x	x	3	5	9	x	x	0.02%	0.03%	0.05%
Other race alone (NH)	4	1	6	13	72	0.04%	0.01%	0.04%	0.07%	0.39%
Mixed race or Multiracial (NH)	x	x	77	171	579	x	x	0.57%	0.96%	3.16%
Hispanic or Latino (any race)	87	54	170	239	444	0.90%	0.50%	1.25%	1.34%	2.42%
Total	9,716	10,750	13,622	17,786	18,333	100.00%	100.00%	100.00%	100.00%	100.00%

=== 2020 census ===
As of the 2020 census, the county had a population of 18,333. The median age was 39.4 years. 22.0% of residents were under the age of 18 and 17.2% of residents were 65 years of age or older. For every 100 females there were 108.6 males, and for every 100 females age 18 and over there were 108.7 males age 18 and over.

The racial makeup of the county was 76.0% White, 17.7% Black or African American, 0.5% American Indian and Alaska Native, 0.6% Asian, <0.1% Native Hawaiian and Pacific Islander, 1.4% from some other race, and 3.8% from two or more races. Hispanic or Latino residents of any race comprised 2.4% of the population.

<0.1% of residents lived in urban areas, while 100.0% lived in rural areas.

There were 6,572 households in the county, of which 32.9% had children under the age of 18 living in them. Of all households, 51.2% were married-couple households, 17.6% were households with a male householder and no spouse or partner present, and 25.6% were households with a female householder and no spouse or partner present. About 24.7% of all households were made up of individuals and 11.6% had someone living alone who was 65 years of age or older.

There were 7,499 housing units, of which 12.4% were vacant. Among occupied housing units, 78.0% were owner-occupied and 22.0% were renter-occupied. The homeowner vacancy rate was 1.7% and the rental vacancy rate was 10.2%.

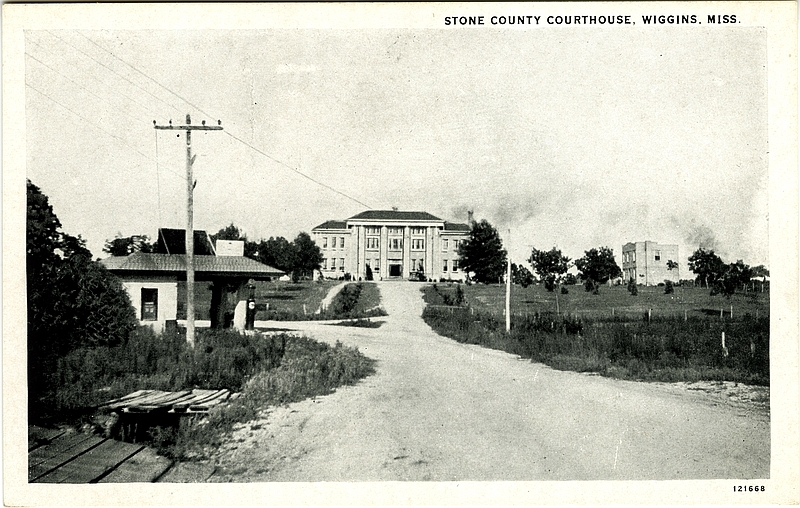
circa 1920

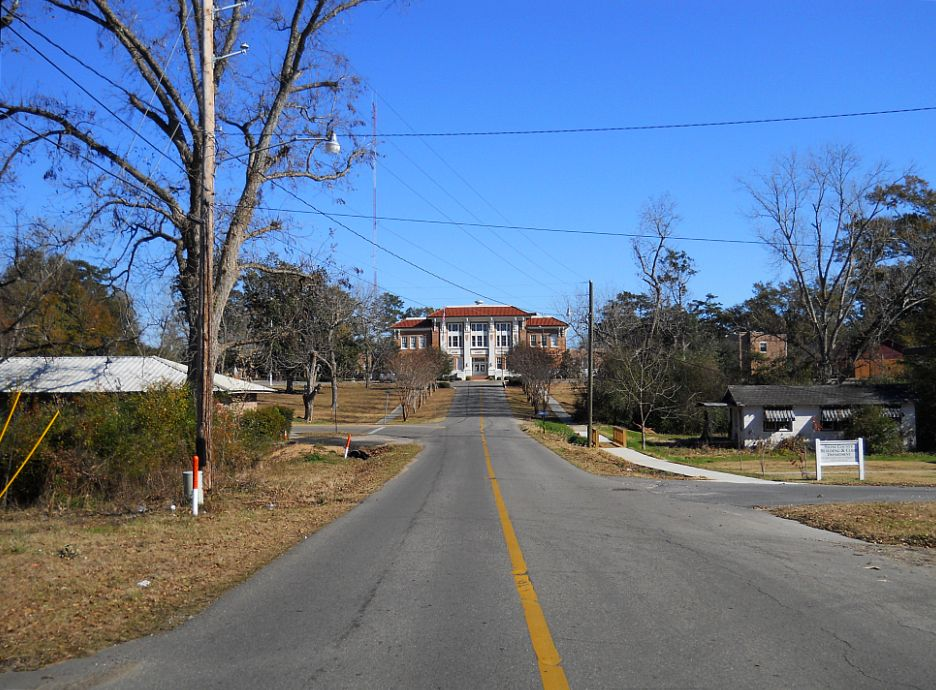
2010

Stone County Courthouse historical timeline

== Arts and culture ==
On April 25, during the 2012 regular session of the Mississippi Legislature, Concurrent Resolution 643 was adopted by the state Senate and state House of Representatives, stating that Stone County be named and declared the Mural County of Mississippi. During the previous 8 years, a Telling Trees Project was developed in Stone County to document and celebrate Stone County's history and heritage. As part of that project, 23 murals, in the form of paintings and mosaic tiles, were created in cooperation with the Art Department, Perkinston campus of Mississippi Gulf Coast Community College and are on public display throughout the county. The murals tell visual stories of Stone County's ecosystems, people, landmarks, and industries.

== Communities ==
=== Cities ===
- Wiggins (county seat)

=== Census-designated place ===
- Bond

=== Unincorporated communities ===
- Beatrice
- Big Level
- McHenry
- Perkinston
- Ramsey Springs
- Silver Run
- Ten Mile
- Texas

== Education ==
=== Public school districts ===
- Stone County School District

=== Colleges ===
- Mississippi Gulf Coast Community College, Perkinston Campus

== Politics ==
Stone County has been a Republican stronghold for decades. The last Democrat to carry it was Jimmy Carter in 1976. In recent elections the county has been especially friendly to Republicans; Donald Trump in 2024 earned the highest share of the vote for any Republican since Nixon in 1972.

United States presidential election results for Stone County, Mississippi
Year	Republican		Democratic		Third party(ies)	
Year	No.	%	No.	%	No.	%
1916	31	6.37%	451	92.61%	5	1.03%
1920	16	5.00%	299	93.44%	5	1.56%
1924	56	11.97%	412	88.03%	0	0.00%
1928	436	62.82%	258	37.18%	0	0.00%
1932	32	6.99%	424	92.58%	2	0.44%
1936	23	3.29%	675	96.43%	2	0.29%
1940	28	3.37%	802	96.63%	0	0.00%
1944	43	4.17%	989	95.83%	0	0.00%
1948	17	1.51%	50	4.45%	1,056	94.03%
1952	569	37.09%	965	62.91%	0	0.00%
1956	293	25.09%	761	65.15%	114	9.76%
1960	275	19.15%	343	23.89%	818	56.96%
1964	1,776	90.84%	179	9.16%	0	0.00%
1968	258	9.51%	314	11.58%	2,140	78.91%
1972	2,467	88.49%	293	10.51%	28	1.00%
1976	1,575	48.05%	1,648	50.27%	55	1.68%
1980	1,888	49.21%	1,821	47.46%	128	3.34%
1984	2,980	71.07%	1,185	28.26%	28	0.67%
1988	3,007	66.84%	1,452	32.27%	40	0.89%
1992	2,295	54.53%	1,447	34.38%	467	11.10%
1996	2,288	53.45%	1,551	36.23%	442	10.32%
2000	3,702	67.03%	1,677	30.36%	144	2.61%
2004	4,146	72.29%	1,528	26.64%	61	1.06%
2008	5,149	71.06%	1,996	27.55%	101	1.39%
2012	5,420	71.96%	2,003	26.59%	109	1.45%
2016	5,306	75.32%	1,573	22.33%	166	2.36%
2020	5,964	75.70%	1,802	22.87%	112	1.42%
2024	6,214	78.47%	1,620	20.46%	85	1.07%

== See also ==
- National Register of Historic Places listings in Stone County, Mississippi
- Land Trust for the Mississippi Coastal Plain
- Sweetbay Bogs Preserve
- List of Mississippi Landmarks in Stone County
