= Wiggins, Stone County, Mississippi =

Wiggins, Mississippi
- City
- City of Wiggins
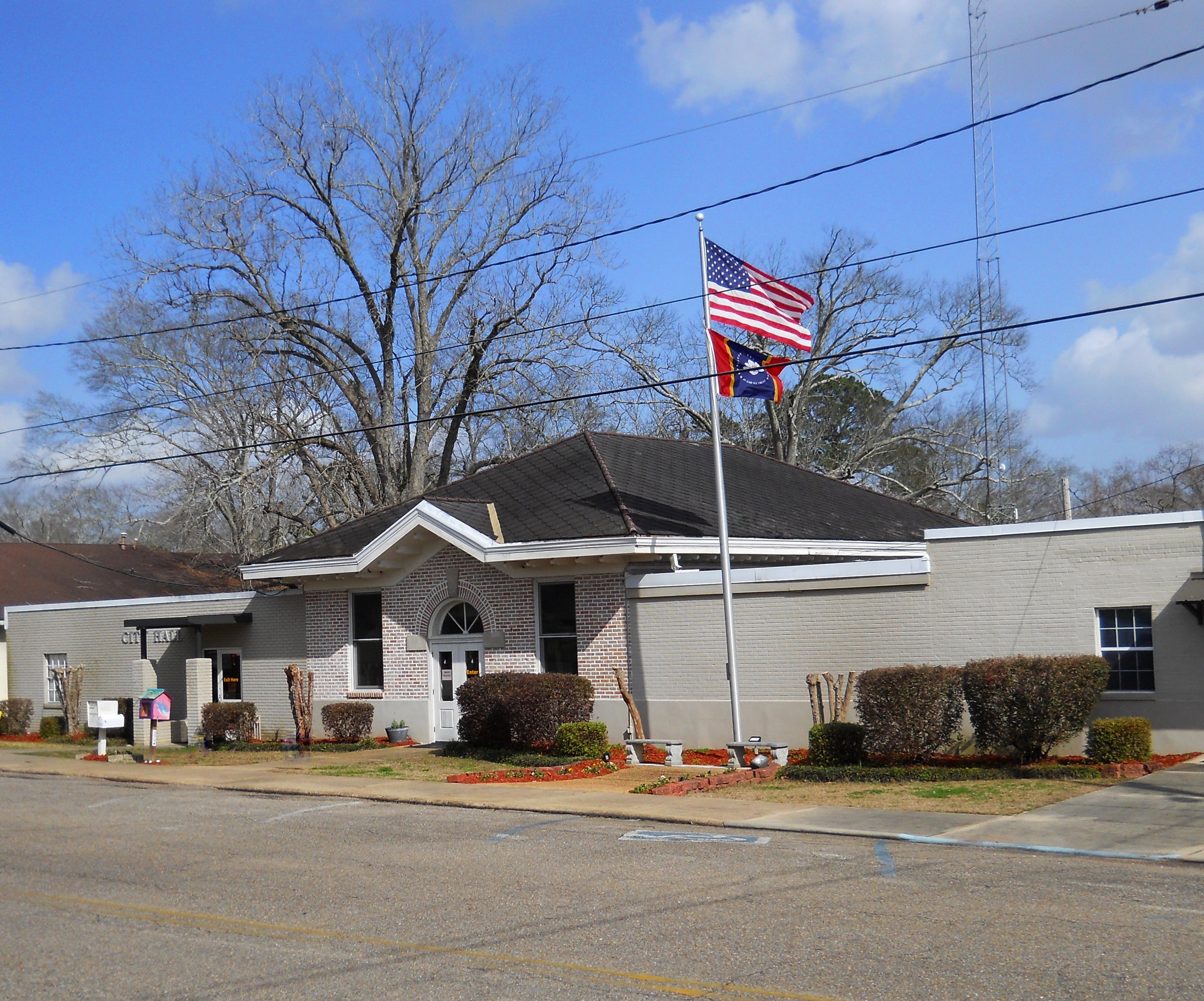
- Wiggins City Hall in January 2021

- Location of Wiggins, Mississippi

- Location in the United States
- Coordinates: 30°51′20″N 89°8′19″W
- Country: United States
- State: Mississippi
- County: Stone

Area
  - Total: 11.26 sq mi (29.17 km^{2})
  - Land: 10.75 sq mi (27.84 km^{2})
  - Water: 0.51 sq mi (1.33 km^{2})
- Elevation: 260 ft (80 m)

Population (2020)
  - Total: 4,272
  - Density: 397.4/sq mi (153.44/km^{2})
- Time zone: UTC-6 (Central (CST))
  - Summer (DST): UTC-5 (CDT)
- ZIP code: 39577
- Area codes: 601, 769
- FIPS code: 28-80160
- GNIS feature ID: 2405742
- Website: www.cityofwiggins.com

Wiggins is a city in and the county seat of Stone County, Mississippi, United States. It is part of the Gulfport-Biloxi metropolitan area. The population was 4,272 at the 2020 census.

== History ==
Wiggins is named after Wiggins Hatten, the father of Madison Hatten, one of the area's original homesteaders. It was incorporated in 1904, and the 1910 census reported 980 residents. In the early 1900s, Wiggins prospered along with the booming timber industry. Wiggins was once headquarters of the Finkbine Lumber Company.

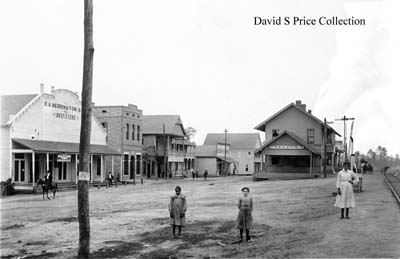
Wiggins business district and railroad depot before the 1910 fire

On January 21, 1910, between the hours of 11 am and 1 pm, over half of the Wiggins business district was destroyed by fire. The fire started from unknown origin in the Hammock Building, a lodging house, and spread rapidly because of strong winds from the northwest. With no city fire department or waterworks, the residents of Wiggins resorted to bucket brigades and dynamite to stop the fire, which was confined to the east side of the Gulf and Ship Island Railroad. The fire consumed 41 business establishments, including the Gulf and Ship Island Railroad depot. Only two or three residential dwellings were destroyed, because most homes were built away from the business district.

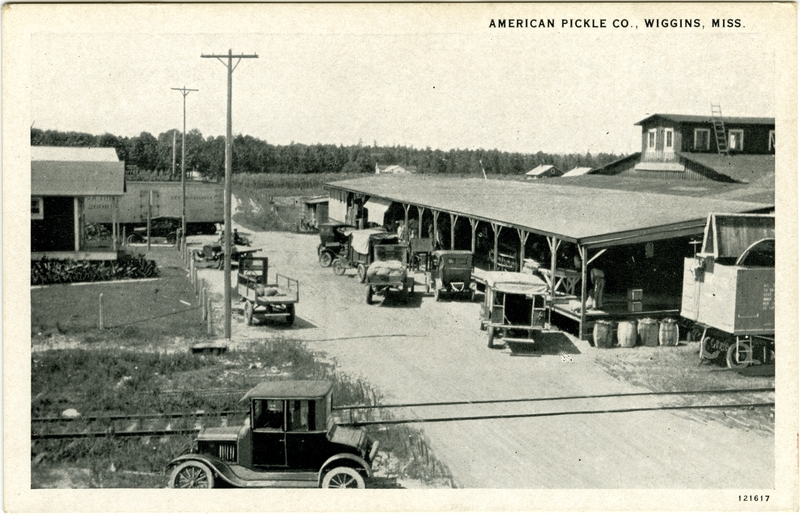
American Pickle and Canning Company in Wiggins, circa 1910

Wiggins has long been known for its pickle production, and at one time boasted of being home to the world's largest pickle processing facility. However, the pickle processing facility is now closed, and although the timber industry has declined since the boom years, it still sustains many businesses in Wiggins.

On June 22, 1935, a mob of 200 white people lynched a black man, R. D. McGee. A white girl had been attacked, and McGee was suspected as the culprit. He was roused from his bed, and taken before the girl. She identified him, a day later, based on the clothing her attacker had been wearing. The same day it was reported that Dewitt Armstrong, another African-American was flogged for making insulting remarks to white women. His death certificate indicated strangulation by "rope party". Although seventeen men were identified as participating in the lynching, the justice department decided no action was merited. In 2016, a group of white students at Stone High School put a noose around a black student's neck. The student's parent alleged that local law enforcement discouraged their family from filing a report.

In June 2021, Wiggins voters elected their first African-American mayor, Darrell Berry, who had served as mayor pro temp since November 2020 and then interim mayor since January 2021, following the death of the city's incumbent mayor. Berry had been an elected Wiggins alderman during three mayoral terms (12 years) prior to his election as mayor. As of June 2021, the city had three African-Americans simultaneously serving on the city council.

=== Pine Hill ===
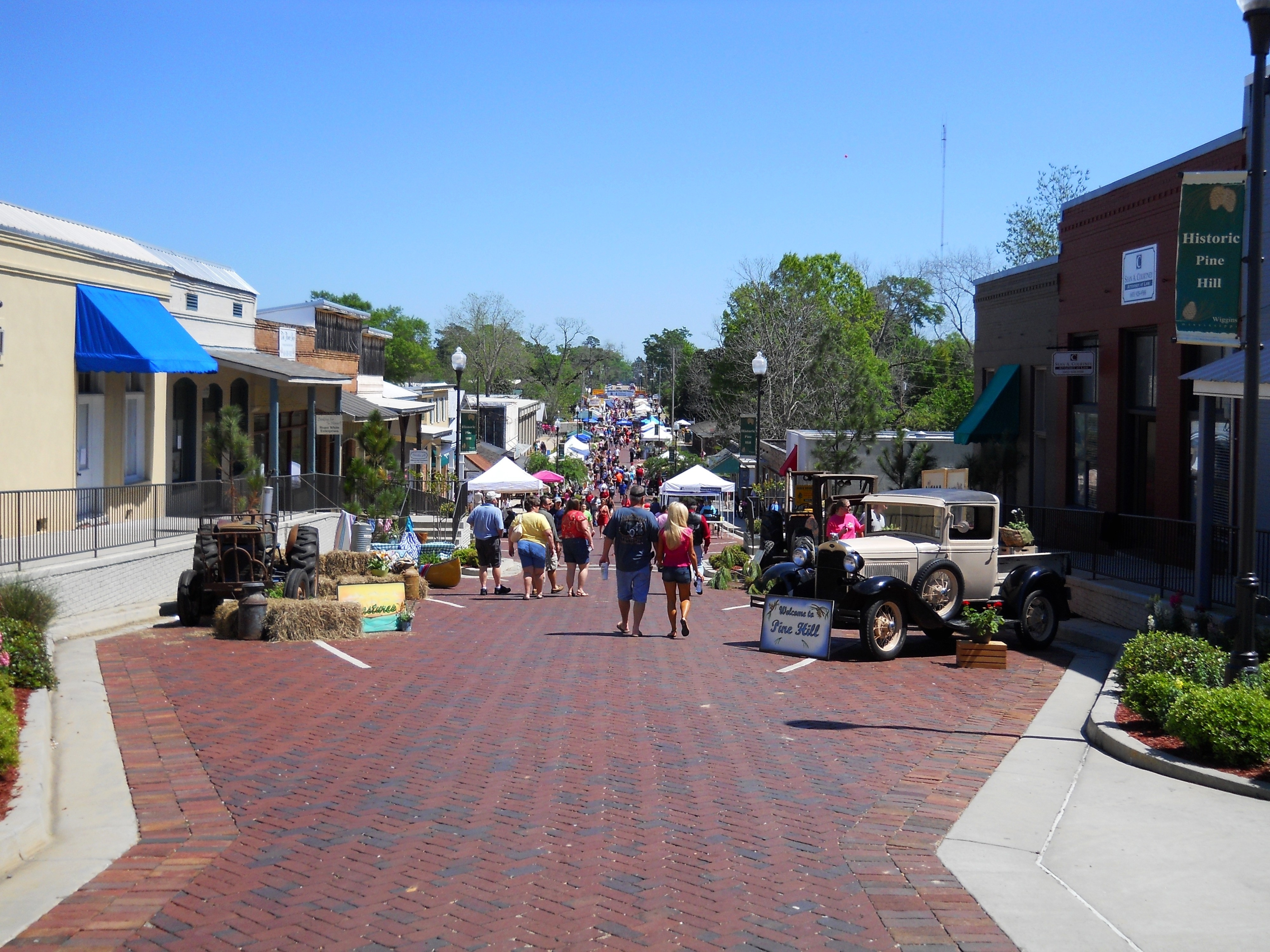
Pine Hill Festival in 2012

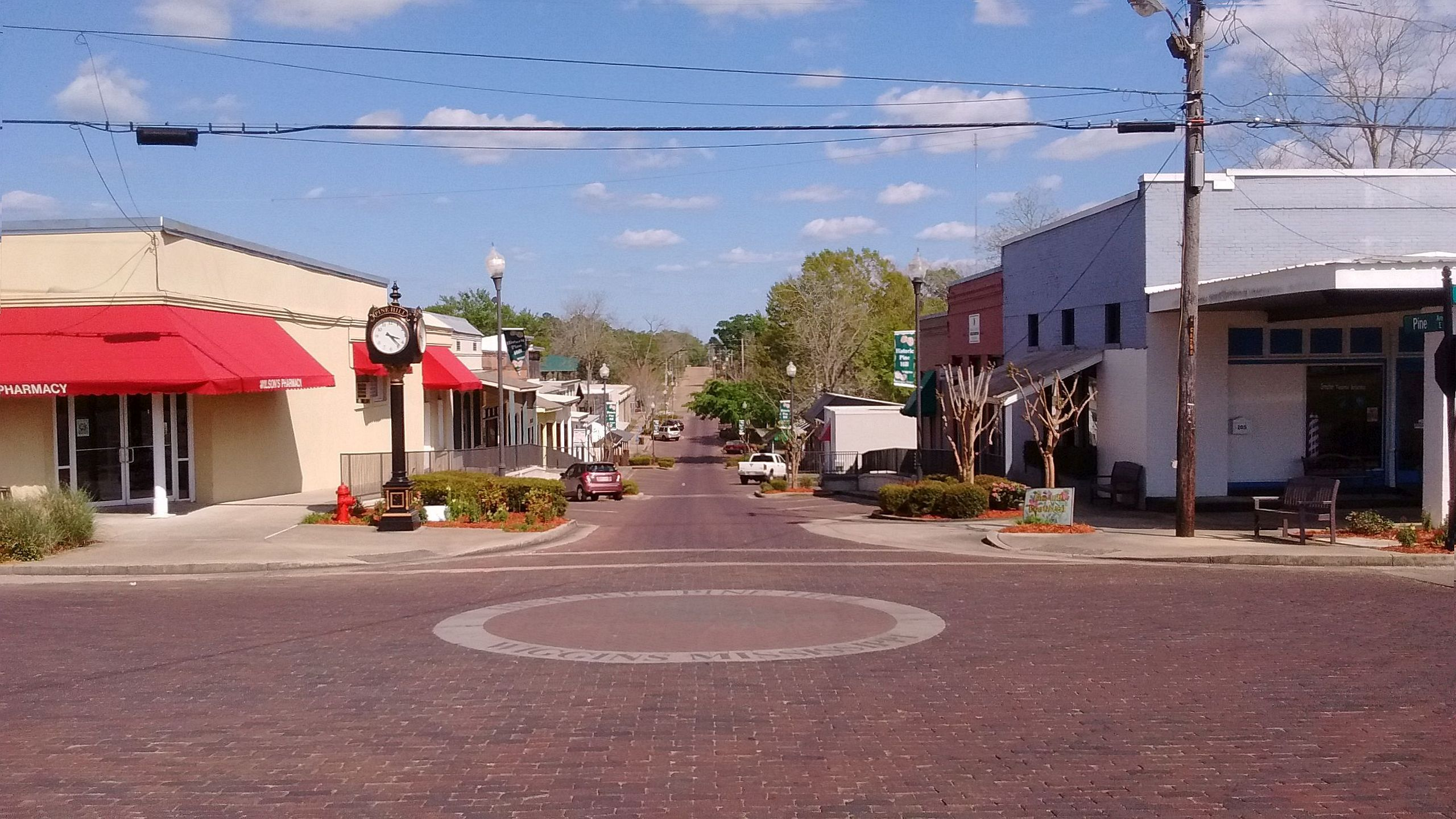
Street view of Pine Hill in 2019

After the 1910 fire and until the 1960s, the center of commerce for Wiggins developed on both sides of Pine Avenue, that sloped downhill and eastward, perpendicular to U.S. Route 49 and Railroad Street (First Street), over a distance of one city block. Small shops were built mainly of brick and were mostly contiguous to each other. Over the years, the shops were occupied by numerous businesses that included drug stores, law offices, a grocery store, a shoe store, a dry cleaners, 5 & dime stores, auto supply store, barber shops, cafes, a movie theater, dry goods outlet, feed & seed outlet, an army surplus store, beauty salons, clothing stores, gift shops, County Library, and U.S. Post Office. In more recent years, the shops have served as real estate offices, CPA & tax preparer outlets, an antique store, newspaper office, ice cream shop, art & frame shop, food outlets, and stationery shop.

In the late 1960s, U.S. Route 49 bypassed the downtown area, and many businesses moved from Pine Hill to other locations within Wiggins. The old Wiggins High School and Elementary School buildings occupied a city block, situated at the base of Pine Hill. When the school buildings were demolished in the 1970s, the school land was dedicated to City use as Blaylock Park. In the 1980s, city and county business leaders saw a need for developing a sense of community and tourism by initiating an annual Pine Hill Day, which later became Pine Hill Festival. During Pine Hill Day, area residents offered items for sale as arts & crafts, in farmers' markets, and as local cuisine. To attract more visitors, other venues such as live music entertainment, competitive foot races, antique vehicle displays, commercial food vendors, and games for kids were added through the years, and the festival became a Spring event. In 2014, an estimated 15,000 people attended the 2-day festival.

== Geography ==
According to the United States Census Bureau, the city has a total area of 11.3 square miles (29 km^{2}), of which, 10.8 square miles (28 km^{2}) of it is land and 0.5 square miles (1.3 km^{2}) of it (4.53%) is water. The entrance to Flint Creek Water Park is located in the city, off Highway 29.

=== Climate ===
Wiggins has a humid subtropical climate (Köppen: Cfa) with long, hot summers and short, mild winters.

Climate data for Wiggins, Mississippi (1991–2020 normals, extremes 1917–present)
| Month | Jan | Feb | Mar | Apr | May | Jun | Jul | Aug | Sep | Oct | Nov | Dec | Year |
|---|---|---|---|---|---|---|---|---|---|---|---|---|---|
| Record high °F (°C) | 85 (29) | 88 (31) | 89 (32) | 98 (37) | 100 (38) | 105 (41) | 105 (41) | 108 (42) | 103 (39) | 96 (36) | 89 (32) | 87 (31) | 108 (42) |
| Mean maximum °F (°C) | 75.6 (24.2) | 77.6 (25.3) | 83.5 (28.6) | 87.1 (30.6) | 92.7 (33.7) | 95.9 (35.5) | 97.6 (36.4) | 97.4 (36.3) | 93.9 (34.4) | 89.4 (31.9) | 81.2 (27.3) | 77.0 (25.0) | 99.3 (37.4) |
| Mean daily maximum °F (°C) | 61.6 (16.4) | 65.6 (18.7) | 72.6 (22.6) | 78.5 (25.8) | 84.7 (29.3) | 90.6 (32.6) | 91.5 (33.1) | 91.5 (33.1) | 87.9 (31.1) | 80.2 (26.8) | 70.3 (21.3) | 63.8 (17.7) | 78.2 (25.7) |
| Daily mean °F (°C) | 48.9 (9.4) | 52.9 (11.6) | 59.2 (15.1) | 65.4 (18.6) | 72.6 (22.6) | 79.2 (26.2) | 80.9 (27.2) | 80.9 (27.2) | 76.7 (24.8) | 67.3 (19.6) | 57.2 (14.0) | 51.6 (10.9) | 66.1 (18.9) |
| Mean daily minimum °F (°C) | 36.2 (2.3) | 40.1 (4.5) | 45.9 (7.7) | 52.2 (11.2) | 60.4 (15.8) | 67.8 (19.9) | 70.3 (21.3) | 70.3 (21.3) | 65.5 (18.6) | 54.5 (12.5) | 44.1 (6.7) | 39.4 (4.1) | 53.9 (12.2) |
| Mean minimum °F (°C) | 20.5 (−6.4) | 24.6 (−4.1) | 28.9 (−1.7) | 36.5 (2.5) | 48.1 (8.9) | 58.5 (14.7) | 64.7 (18.2) | 64.2 (17.9) | 53.6 (12.0) | 37.7 (3.2) | 28.9 (−1.7) | 24.2 (−4.3) | 17.8 (−7.9) |
| Record low °F (°C) | 1 (−17) | 7 (−14) | 15 (−9) | 29 (−2) | 36 (2) | 48 (9) | 54 (12) | 56 (13) | 37 (3) | 25 (−4) | 18 (−8) | 7 (−14) | 1 (−17) |
| Average precipitation inches (mm) | 6.05 (154) | 5.30 (135) | 5.86 (149) | 5.46 (139) | 5.51 (140) | 5.90 (150) | 7.28 (185) | 6.12 (155) | 5.89 (150) | 3.95 (100) | 4.12 (105) | 5.92 (150) | 67.36 (1,711) |
| Average precipitation days (≥ 0.01 in) | 10.5 | 8.8 | 8.1 | 6.8 | 7.6 | 10.3 | 12.8 | 10.1 | 8.8 | 6.7 | 7.1 | 8.4 | 106.0 |
Source: NOAA

== Demographics ==
Historical population
| Census | Pop. | Note | %± |
|---|---|---|---|
| 1910 | 980 | | — |
| 1920 | 1,037 | | 5.8% |
| 1930 | 1,074 | | 3.6% |
| 1940 | 1,141 | | 6.2% |
| 1950 | 1,436 | | 25.9% |
| 1960 | 1,591 | | 10.8% |
| 1970 | 2,995 | | 88.2% |
| 1980 | 3,205 | | 7.0% |
| 1990 | 3,185 | | −0.6% |
| 2000 | 3,849 | | 20.8% |
| 2010 | 4,390 | | 14.1% |
| 2020 | 4,272 | | −2.7% |
U.S. Decennial Census; 2012 Estimate

Wiggins racial composition as of 2020
| Race | Number | Percent |
|---|---|---|
| White | 2,661 | 62.29% |
| Black or African American | 1,348 | 31.55% |
| Native American | 15 | 0.35% |
| Asian | 26 | 0.61% |
| Pacific Islander | 1 | 0.02% |
| Other/Mixed | 145 | 3.39% |
| Hispanic or Latino | 76 | 1.78% |

As of the 2020 United States census, there were 4,272 people, 1,348 households, and 889 families residing in the city.

== Education ==
- The City of Wiggins is served by the Stone County School District.
- Gateway Christian Academy (A private school, serving Nursery/Preschool–12.)

== Media ==
- Stone County Enterprise, "Your hometown newspaper since 1916"
- Wiggins is part of Mississippi Gulf Coast Radio and Television Stations Market Area

== Infrastructure ==
- Airport: Dean Griffin Memorial Airport
- Highways: U.S. Highway 49, Mississippi Highway 26, Mississippi Highway 29
- Railroad: Kansas City Southern Railroad

== Notable people ==
- William Joel Blass, attorney and educator
- Chris Boykin, CEO of Big Black Inc.
- Sammy Brown, professional football player
- Jay Hanna "Dizzy" Dean, professional baseball player and radio personality, lived in the nearby Bond community
- Justin Evans, professional football player
- Jay Paul Gumm, former member of the Oklahoma State Senate
- Shannon Harris, football coach
- Anthony Herrera, actor, soap opera star
- Marcus Hinton, gridiron football player
- Boyce Holleman, attorney and actor
- Rebekah Jones, whistleblower
- Fred Lewis, former Cincinnati Reds outfielder
- Stevon Moore, retired from NFL Cleveland Browns and Baltimore Ravens
- Taylor Spreitler, actress
- Emilie Blackmore Stapp, author and philanthropist
- Darryl Tillman, former Arena Football League player

== See also ==
- Wiggins Depot
