= List of United States tornadoes from November to December 2022 =

List of tornadoes in the United States

United States tornadoes from November to December 2022
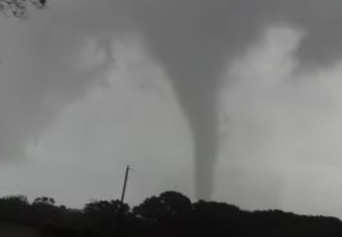
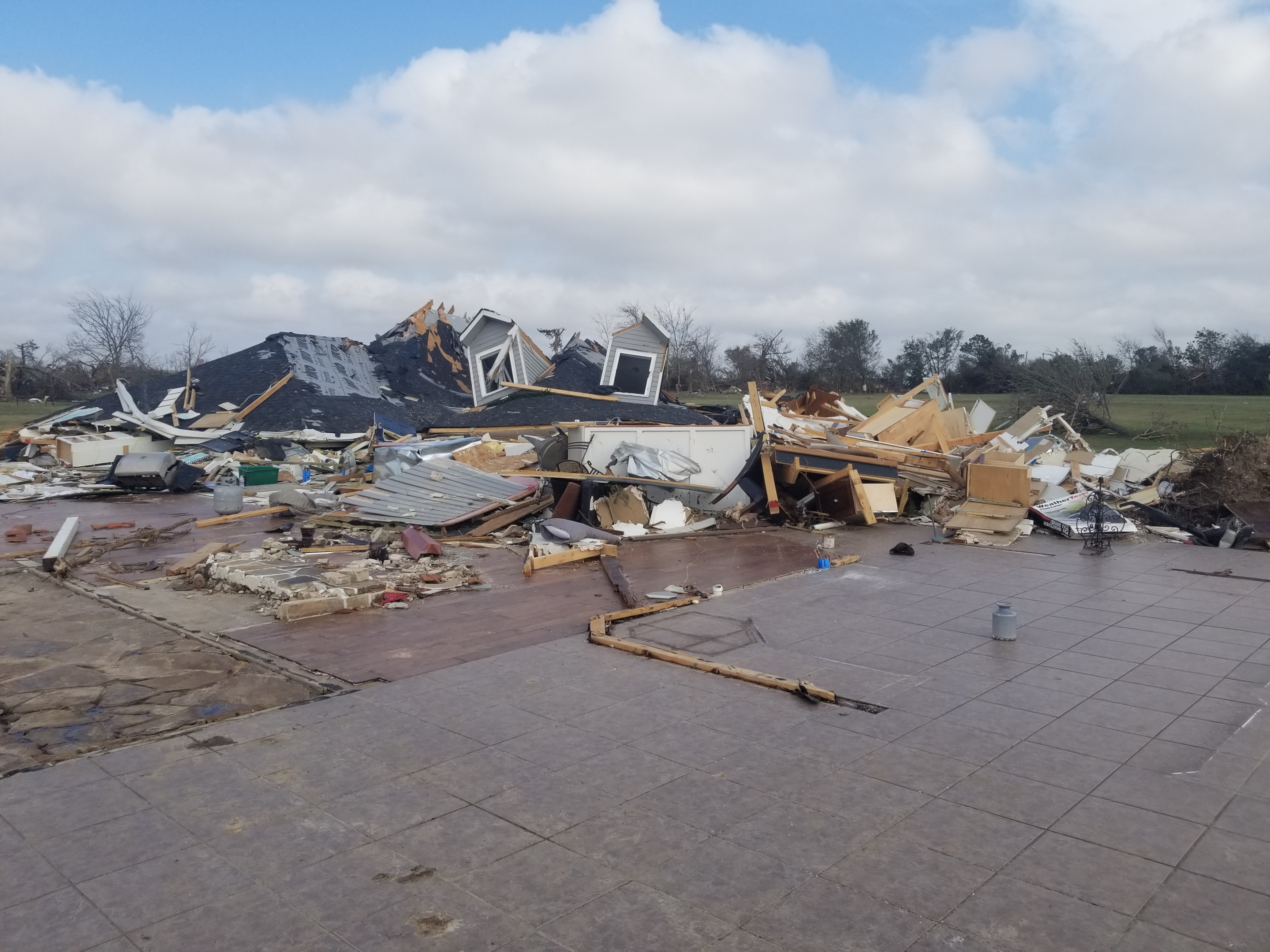
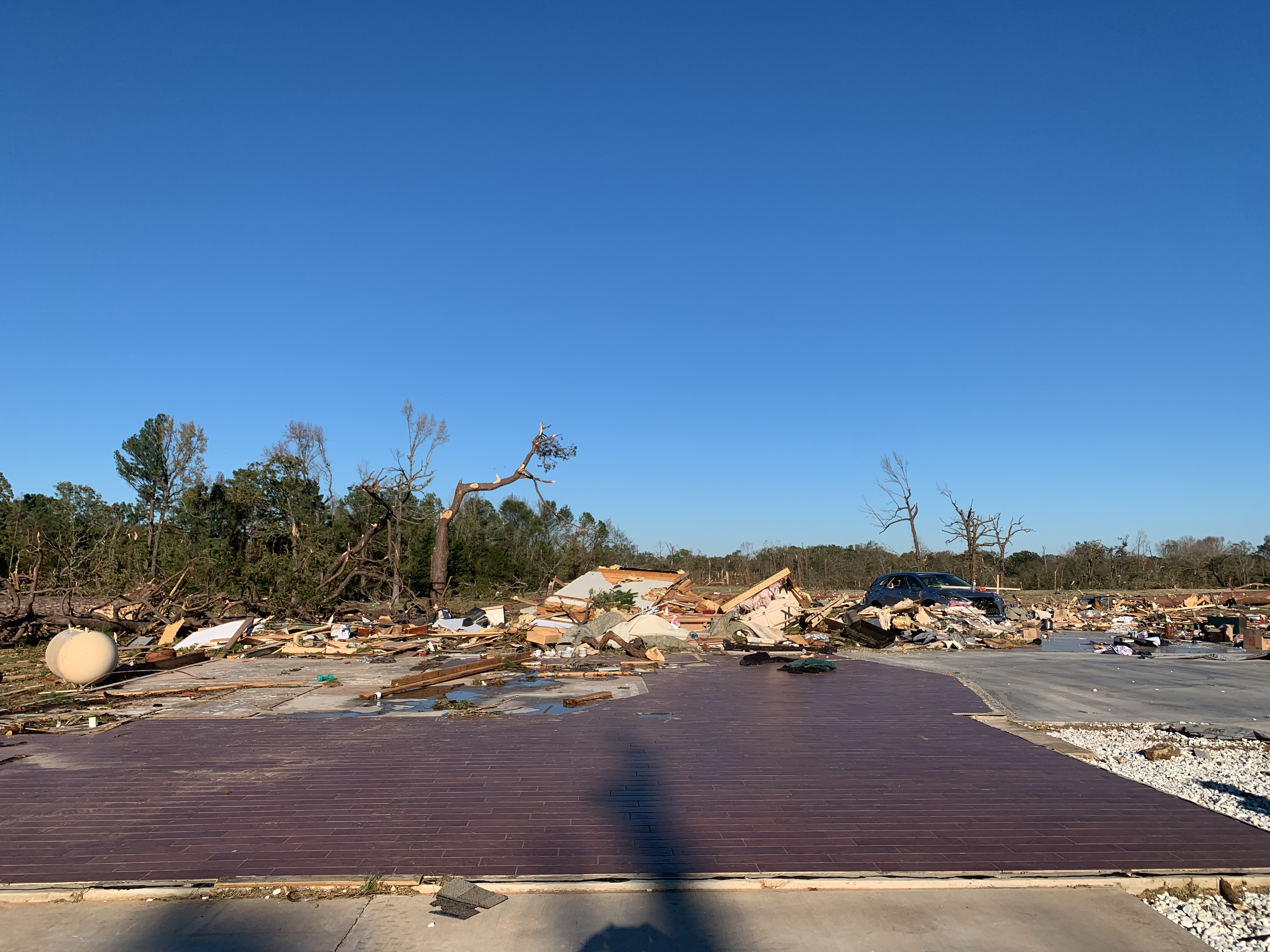
- Clockwise from top: An EF4 tornado near Midcity, Texas on November 4; A home after an EF4 tornado north of Clarksville, Texas on November 4; EF4 damage from a tornado that struck Caviness, Texas on November 4.
- Timespan: November 4 – December 31
- Maximum rated tornado: EF4 tornado: Caviness, Texas on November 4; Clarksville, Texas on November 4
- Tornadoes: 142
- Fatalities: 8
- Injuries: 70

This page documents all tornadoes confirmed by various weather forecast offices of the National Weather Service in the United States from November to December 2022. On average, there are 54 confirmed tornadoes in the United States in November and 28 in December. In November and December, these tornadoes are most likely in the southern states due to their proximity to the unstable airmass and warm waters of the Gulf of Mexico, with occasional incursions farther north into the Midwest especially in November.

Most of the tornadoes during the month of November came from two significant outbreaks. The first one produced 31 tornadoes at the beginning of the month, including two violent EF4 tornadoes, while the other at the end of the month produced 27. As a result, November finished with a near average 63 tornadoes. December was significantly above average, with 79 tornadoes. Almost all of the tornadoes occurred during an outbreak in the middle of the month that produced 77 tornadoes.

== United States yearly total ==
Confirmed tornadoes by Enhanced Fujita rating
EFU	EF0	EF1	EF2	EF3	EF4	EF5	Total
157	406	466	123	20	4	0	1,176

== November ==
Confirmed tornadoes by Enhanced Fujita rating
EFU	EF0	EF1	EF2	EF3	EF4	EF5	Total
5	14	26	12	4	2	0	63

=== November 4 event ===
List of confirmed tornadoes – Friday, November 4, 2022 (Note: All dates are based on the local time zone where the tornado touched down; however, all times are in Coordinated Universal Time for consistency.)
EF#	Location	County / Parish	State	Start Coord.	Time (UTC)	Path length	Max width
EF1	Calera	Bryan	OK	33.912°N 96.458°W	18:30–18:34	3.4 mi (5.5 km)	40 yd (37 m)
EF1	A mobile home was overturned and destroyed, other mobile homes were damaged, and a semi-truck and trailer were thrown into the median of US 69 near the beginning of the path. Utility poles were snapped, and highway signs and billboards were damaged as well. The tornado moved northeast and through the western sections of Calera. Damage in town was primarily to trees, although two homes were significantly damaged by falling trees. Some other homes suffered shingle damage as well.						
EF4	SW of Brookston, TX to Midcity, TX to ESE of Spencerville, OK	Lamar (TX), Choctaw (OK)	TX, OK	33.5995°N 95.749°W	21:16–22:12	44.71 mi (71.95 km)	1,700 yd (1,600 m)
EF4	See section on this tornado – Eleven people were injured.						
EF1	W of Dougherty to WNW of Bonanza	Rains, Hopkins	TX	32.9545°N 95.7928°W	22:08–22:14	4.38 mi (7.05 km)	150 yd (140 m)
EF1	A carport and many large trees were damaged.						
EF2	SW of Sulphur Springs	Hopkins	TX	33.0072°N 95.7297°W	22:15–22:19	2.9 mi (4.7 km)	160 yd (150 m)
EF2	A relatively narrow but strong tornado touched down almost immediately after the previous tornado dissipated, snapping trees and causing significant damage to multiple houses in the Greenview community. One of the homes had roof and exterior wall loss, and another residence was pushed off its foundation.						
EF2	S of Malakoff to NE of Athens	Henderson	TX	32.1080°N 96.0044°W	22:35–22:58	15.05 mi (24.22 km)	150 yd (140 m)
EF2	A wedding venue was damaged south of Malakoff before this heavy rain-wrapped tornado moved towards Athens. Numerous homes and outbuildings were damaged in and around Athens, and a Dollar General store had its windows blown out. The Athens Steel Building Corporation, housed in a large metal warehouse building, had major roof damage and sustained collapse of the southern part of the structure. More structures were damaged after the tornado exited Athens before it dissipated just southwest of Murchison. Numerous trees were snapped or uprooted along the path.						
EF2	SE of Pickens to NW of Battiest	McCurtain	OK	34.3908°N 94.9909°W	22:46–22:49	2.83 mi (4.55 km)	800 yd (730 m)
EF2	1 death – Shortly after touching down, this tornado destroyed a chicken house, tore large sections of roof off a home, and snapped hardwood trees. The tornado then flipped and destroyed a tied-down double-wide mobile home, resulting in a fatality. One person was also injured at this location, and a nearby vehicle was rolled. Additional trees were snapped before the tornado dissipated.						
EF1	E of Honobia	McCurtain, LeFlore	OK	34.4578°N 94.9439°W	22:51–23:07	11.3 mi (18.2 km)	1,600 yd (1,500 m)
EF1	A nearly mile-wide tornado snapped and uprooted numerous trees. A few homes were damaged and several outbuildings were destroyed.						
EF4	SW of Bogata, TX to Idabel, OK to NE of Eagletown, OK	Red River (TX), McCurtain (OK)	TX, OK	33.5047°N 95.2418°W	23:15–00:21	60.23 mi (96.93 km)	1,056 yd (966 m)
EF4	See section on this tornado — A total of 13 people were injured.						
EF1	E of Heavener	LeFlore	OK	34.871°N 94.589°W	23:33–23:41	6.5 mi (10.5 km)	900 yd (820 m)
EF1	This tornado touched down just southeast of Heavener, where several homes were damaged, and outbuildings were destroyed. Numerous trees were snapped or uprooted as the tornado moved northeast into heavily wooded, mountainous terrain.						
EF1	ESE of Pittsburg	Camp	TX	32.9458°N 94.8712°W	23:38–23:41	2.22 mi (3.57 km)	350 yd (320 m)
EF1	Trees were uprooted by this relatively brief tornado. The same supercell would produce the Cason EF3 tornado shortly after this one dissipated.						
EF3	S of Cason to E of Naples	Morris, Cass	TX	33.0218°N 94.8157°W	23:44–00:06	16.91 mi (27.21 km)	650 yd (590 m)
EF3	1 death – See section on this tornado — Eight people were injured.						
EF1	NE of Winslow	Washington	AR	35.829°N 94.054°W	23:53–00:00	6.5 mi (10.5 km)	1,000 yd (910 m)
EF1	This tornado moved through wooded and rugged terrain, uprooting trees and snapping a few power poles before dissipating.						
EF1	SW of Mansfield to NE of Huntington	Sebastian	AR	35.019°N 94.272°W	23:58–00:07	5.8 mi (9.3 km)	1,000 yd (910 m)
EF1	This high-end EF1 tornado struck Mansfield, where tree damage occurred and 16 homes were damaged, some significantly. Trees were snapped or uprooted at the east edge of Huntington and elsewhere along the path. Several outbuildings were damaged, power poles were downed, and a house between the two towns sustained considerable roof damage.						
EF3	W of Simms to N of New Boston	Bowie	TX	33.3163°N 94.5625°W	00:17–00:38	15.65 mi (25.19 km)	800 yd (730 m)
EF3	See section on this tornado						
EF0	NE of Huntsville	Madison	AR	36.115°N 93.697°W	00:20–00:22	1.3 mi (2.1 km)	150 yd (140 m)
EF0	A poultry barn received damage to its roof, and multiple trees were uprooted.						
EFU	Fort Chaffee	Sebastian, Franklin	AR	35.228°N 94.099°W	00:22–00:28	2.5 mi (4.0 km)	150 yd (140 m)
EFU	Tree damage occurred at Fort Chaffee, though the tornado moved through an area that was inaccessible to the damage survey team, and no intensity rating was assigned.						
EF2	SW of Hughes Springs to W of Douglassville	Cass	TX	32.9829°N 94.645°W	00:37–01:00	19.67 mi (31.66 km)	700 yd (640 m)
EF2	The tornado first struck the town of Hughes Springs, inflicting considerable damage to homes, heavily damaging some outbuildings and the fire station in town, and downing trees and power poles. The tornado reached peak strength shortly after it exited town, as two homes sustained loss of their roofs, including one that had some exterior walls partially knocked over. The tornado then weakened and downed numerous trees as it continued through sparsely populated areas. However, the tornado re-intensified near Cusseta, and countless large trees were snapped and twisted in this area, while a structure was damaged to a lesser degree. The tornado then weakened again, causing additional tree damage before dissipating over SH 77.						
EF1	NW of Branch	Franklin	AR	35.340°N 93.913°W	00:38–00:42	3.3 mi (5.3 km)	350 yd (320 m)
EF1	A few homes were damaged, outbuildings were destroyed, and trees were snapped or uprooted.						
EF0	W of Etna	Franklin	AR	35.370°N 93.900°W	00:41–00:43	1.7 mi (2.7 km)	150 yd (140 m)
EF0	Outbuildings were damaged and tree branches were snapped.						
EF1	SE of Wickes	Polk	AR	34.2862°N 94.3135°W	00:43–00:45	1.8 mi (2.9 km)	200 yd (180 m)
EF1	Several chicken houses had their roof panels ripped off, and one had its walls collapsed. Tree damage occurred along US 278 before the tornado dissipated.						
EF1	Green Forest	Carroll	AR	36.307°N 93.489°W	00:43–00:51	8.5 mi (13.7 km)	1,100 yd (1,000 m)
EF1	This tornado moved directly through Green Forest, where many homes had roof damage and broken windows, and one house had its garage door pushed in. A few businesses in town sustained minor damage, while fences and light poles were bent at a baseball field. Additional damage occurred outside of town, where several outbuildings and poultry barns were damaged or destroyed, and a few homes were damaged as well. Many trees and some power poles were downed along the path.						
EF1	W of Denning	Franklin, Logan	AR	35.416°N 93.829°W	00:46–00:51	3.1 mi (5.0 km)	1,100 yd (1,000 m)
EF1	Trees were uprooted, tree branches were snapped, and large round hay bales were moved.						
EF2	SW of Center Point to N of Briar	Howard	AR	34.0178°N 93.9763°W	01:37–01:43	8.14 mi (13.10 km)	200 yd (180 m)
EF2	To the west of Center Point, some chicken houses were badly damaged, a metal outbuilding was destroyed, and other outbuildings were damaged. Carports were torn from homes as well, one of which was thrown 100 yd (91 m). The most intense damage occurred as the tornado crossed US 278, where a free-standing communications tower was toppled to the ground and a mobile home was destroyed at low-end EF2 intensity. Numerous large trees were snapped or uprooted as the tornado moved through densely forested areas before it dissipated near Briar. This tornado was very fast-moving and had an average forward speed of 81.6 miles per hour (131.3 km/h).						
EF1	SW of Bluffton	Yell	AR	34.8638°N 93.6553°W	01:49–01:53	3.7 mi (6.0 km)	600 yd (550 m)
EF1	A mobile home was damaged, a carport was destroyed, and trees were snapped or uprooted along the path.						
EF2	SE of Kirby	Pike	AR	34.2297°N 93.6332°W	02:08–02:10	1.7 mi (2.7 km)	75 yd (69 m)
EF2	A barn was completely destroyed and many trees were snapped or uprooted by this brief low-end EF2 tornado. Power lines were downed, and a metal outbuilding sustained minor roof damage.						
EF1	NW of Plainview	Yell	AR	35.0074°N 93.3366°W	02:15–02:18	2.3 mi (3.7 km)	100 yd (91 m)
EF1	Trees were snapped or uprooted, a double-wide manufactured home had its roof damaged, and an outbuilding was completely destroyed.						
EF1	NE of Gurdon to E of Gum Springs	Clark	AR	33.9722°N 93.0618°W	03:00–03:07	7.7 mi (12.4 km)	200 yd (180 m)
EF1	An old church building was shifted slightly off its block foundation, a house sustained minor damage, and numerous trees were downed.						
EF1	S of Malvern	Hot Spring	AR	34.268°N 92.8255°W	03:27–03:28	0.4 mi (0.64 km)	150 yd (140 m)
EF1	A brief tornado snapped trees and inflicted minor damage to a metal outbuilding.						
EF0	N of Spring Ridge	Caddo	LA	32.3166°N 93.9581°W	03:57–03:59	1.26 mi (2.03 km)	70 yd (64 m)
EF0	This brief tornado tore roof shingles and siding from a home and snapped numerous tree branches.						
EF2	SE of Sardis	Saline	AR	34.5138°N 92.4014°W	04:04–04:06	1.6 mi (2.6 km)	200 yd (180 m)
EF2	A brief but strong tornado damaged several homes, two of which were completely unroofed. Numerous trees were snapped or uprooted as well.						

=== November 5 event ===
List of confirmed tornadoes – Saturday, November 5, 2022
EF#	Location	County / Parish	State	Start Coord.	Time (UTC)	Path length	Max width
EF0	SW of Big Rock	Kendall, Kane	IL	41.7172°N 88.5733°W	16:06–16:10	3.7 mi (6.0 km)	100 yd (91 m)
EF0	Trees and power lines were downed sporadically, and a barn sustained roof damage.						

=== November 8 event ===
List of confirmed tornadoes – Tuesday, November 8, 2022 (Note: All dates are based on the local time zone where the tornado touched down; however, all times are in Coordinated Universal Time for consistency.)
EF#	Location	County / Parish	State	Start Coord.	Time (UTC)	Path length	Max width
EF0	N of Galt	Sacramento	CA	38.33°N 121.32°W	21:40–21:45	0.8 mi (1.3 km)	400 yd (370 m)
EF0	A brief tornado occurred, downing power lines and blowing a tin roofing off of a barn.						

=== November 11 event ===
List of confirmed tornadoes – Friday, November 11, 2022
EF#	Location	County / Parish	State	Start Coord.	Time (UTC)	Path length	Max width
EF0	N of Newtown to SSW of Hustle	King and Queen, Caroline	VA	37.95°N 77.11°W	20:43–20:48	2.87 mi (4.62 km)	150 yd (140 m)
EF0	Several outbuildings were severely damaged or destroyed, while one silo and three tractors were damaged. Trees were uprooted and tree limbs were snapped along the path.						
EF0	SE of McKenney	Dinwiddie	VA	36.93°N 77.62°W	20:59–21:04	2.09 mi (3.36 km)	50 yd (46 m)
EF0	This tornado was caught on drone video by a storm chaser. A cedar tree was snapped and tree limbs were broken.						

=== November 26 event ===
List of confirmed tornadoes – Saturday, November 26, 2022
EF#	Location	County / Parish	State	Start Coord.	Time (UTC)	Path length	Max width
EF1	Paradis	St. Charles	LA	29.8575°N 90.4491°W	20:18–20:22	1.95 mi (3.14 km)	200 yd (180 m)
EF1	This tornado touched down peeling the roof off of a house and rolling over an RV. Extensive tree damage was noted and debris at this property was thrown a significant distance. As the tornado continued northeast, it damaged the roof of a church complex and flipped another RV. The tornado then weakened as it continued a little further, damaging trees and shingles and siding on structures.						
EF1	NNE of Talisheek to E of Bush	St. Tammany	LA	30.5557°N 89.8584°W	21:34–21:41	3.01 mi (4.84 km)	75 yd (69 m)
EF1	A tornado touched down near Talisheek and quickly intensified, uprooting numerous trees east of Cow Hammock Lake. A tornado debris signature was observed on radar, with the maximum width estimated from the swath of damage visible in satellite imagery. The tornado occluded as it moved north over inaccessible land west of the Bogue Chitto River.						

=== November 29 event ===
List of confirmed tornadoes – Tuesday, November 29, 2022
EF#	Location	County / Parish	State	Start Coord.	Time (UTC)	Path length	Max width
EF1	SW of Tilton	Lawrence	MS	31.3837°N 90.0653°W	22:24–22:28	2 mi (3.2 km)	200 yd (180 m)
EF1	A house and a metal shed were damaged, and numerous trees were either snapped or uprooted.						
EF0	SW of Bassfield	Jefferson Davis, Marion	MS	31.4257°N 89.8311°W	23:02–23:10	3.4 mi (5.5 km)	70 yd (64 m)
EF0	A weak, intermittent tornado uprooted and damaged several trees.						
EF1	N of Bywy to S of Mathiston	Choctaw	MS	33.4605°N 89.2425°W	23:11–23:21	6.8 mi (10.9 km)	330 yd (300 m)
EF1	This tornado touched down along MS 9 before moving across the Natchez Trace Parkway. An RV was rolled, the roof of a barn was torn off, and numerous trees were downed before the tornado dissipated after crossing MS 15.						
EF1	SSW of Bassfield	Jefferson Davis	MS	31.4597°N 89.7572°W	23:14–23:21	3.9 mi (6.3 km)	400 yd (370 m)
EF1	Some tin roofing was torn off a large shed, a brick home sustained minor roof damage, and an awning was blown down. The tornado reached its peak intensity of high-end EF1 as it crossed MS 42 shortly before dissipating, and numerous trees were snapped or uprooted in this area. A metal shed had most of its roof removed as well.						
EF3	SE of Clarks	Caldwell	LA	31.9743°N 92.0655°W	00:03–00:13	7.96 mi (12.81 km)	300 yd (270 m)
EF3	This tornado reached its peak intensity of low-end EF3 immediately after it touched down along LA 126. Trees were partially debarked, outbuildings and mobile homes were destroyed, and the ground was deeply scoured in open fields, with clumps of dirt and grass pulled up. Elsewhere along the path, another mobile home was destroyed, a home suffered roof damage, a power pole was snapped, and many trees were snapped or uprooted. One person was injured.						
EF2	WSW of Wells to ESE of Woodlawn	Lowndes	MS	33.5834°N 88.4232°W	00:26–00:40	8.4 mi (13.5 km)	375 yd (343 m)
EF2	This strong tornado first struck the Wells community, where trees were snapped, and a church steeple was blown over. The tornado reached high-end EF2 intensity just south of Woodlawn near MS 12, where a metal fire department building was significantly damaged, two homes had roof and exterior wall loss, other homes had severe roof damage and broken windows, and outbuildings were destroyed. The tornado caused additional tree damage before dissipating.						
EF2	E of Stringer to S of Paulding	Jasper	MS	31.8464°N 89.2062°W	00:30–00:51	11.8 mi (19.0 km)	300 yd (270 m)
EF2	A shed was completely destroyed, with its debris scattered across a sizeable area. A well-built brick home was completely unroofed and had an exterior wall knocked down, with sections of the roof thrown and deposited a considerable distance away. An older wood-frame home lost a substantial part of its roof, and also sustained window and wall damage. Other homes were damaged to a lesser degree, and many trees were snapped or uprooted.						
EF1	W of Louisville to S of Tollison	Winston, Choctaw	MS	33.1516°N 89.1956°W	00:49–00:55	5.2 mi (8.4 km)	300 yd (270 m)
EF1	This low-end EF1 tornado snapped and uprooted numerous softwood trees northwest of Louisville.						
EFU	SW of Richmond	Madison	LA	32.2898°N 91.3668°W	01:06–01:07	1.1 mi (1.8 km)	Unknown
EFU	A storm chaser observed a tornado near the Tensas River, though a National Weather Service survey team was unable to find evidence of damage due to inaccessible roads. The tornado came from the same storm that produced the Clarks EF3 tornado.						
EFU	N of Thomastown	Madison	LA	32.3972°N 91.0795°W	01:32–01:34	0.4 mi (0.64 km)	Unknown
EFU	This tornado, which came from the same storm that produced the Clarks EF3 tornado and the Richmond EFU tornado, was photographed and caught on video by several storm chasers. No damage was found.						
EF1	SE of Penns	Lowndes	MS	33.3312°N 88.6363°W	01:34–01:41	2.48 mi (3.99 km)	250 yd (230 m)
EF1	A low-end EF1 tornado damaged or uprooted several trees.						
EF1	W of Eutaw to S of Moundville	Greene, Hale	AL	32.8445°N 87.9401°W	03:44–04:13	19.49 mi (31.37 km)	1,200 yd (1,100 m)
EF1	A large, high-end EF1 tornado first moved through the north side of Eutaw, causing roof damage to some homes, snapping and uprooting numerous trees, and downing power lines. An apartment building had its entire roof torn off, and other nearby apartment buildings sustained less severe roof damage. It continued northeast and impacted the Oak Village community, where a mobile home sustained significant damage, outbuildings were damaged or destroyed, and trees were downed. The tornado continued farther to the northeast, producing more damage to trees and the roofs of homes in Stewart before dissipating south of Moundville. This tornado moved over the same path as a low-end EF3 tornado that struck on March 25, 2021. A high-end EF2 tornado would then move over the entire tracks of both tornadoes just 44 days later on January 12, 2023.						

=== November 30 event ===
List of confirmed tornadoes – Wednesday, November 30, 2022
EF#	Location	County / Parish	State	Start Coord.	Time (UTC)	Path length	Max width
EF0	WNW of Fairview	Walker	AL	33.6237°N 87.3830°W	06:28–06:30	1.99 mi (3.20 km)	50 yd (46 m)
EF0	A few trees were downed along SR 69. Part of the track was in an inaccessible area and was unable to be surveyed.						
EF1	N of Gillsburg to SSE of Magnolia	Amite, Pike	MS	31.1033°N 90.6101°W	06:38–06:59	12.44 mi (20.02 km)	250 yd (230 m)
EF1	Numerous large trees were either snapped or uprooted, a house had part of its roof removed, and a barn was destroyed. A mobile home was pushed off its foundation and rolled over, while another mobile home had total roof loss and sustained collapse of a wall. A campground sustained damage near the end of the path.						
EF0	Locust Fork	Blount	AL	33.9149°N 86.6725°W	06:57–07:02	3.46 mi (5.57 km)	500 yd (460 m)
EF0	A weak tornado embedded in a squall line caused roof damage to two barns, rolled and destroyed a camper trailer, and caused minor roof damage to homes and other structures in Locust Fork. Several trees and tree branches were downed as well, some of which landed on structures and caused damage.						
EF1	SW of Sweet Water to N of Magnolia	Marengo	AL	32.0608°N 87.9057°W	07:11–07:30	15.49 mi (24.93 km)	525 yd (480 m)
EF1	A mobile home lost its roof, a couple of outbuildings lost portions of their roofs, and a home lost a patio overhang. Another home sustained roof and shingle damage, and a camper was moved a few feet. Numerous trees were uprooted and snapped, and one tree was blown into a mobile home in the rural community of Wayne, damaging a wall.						
EF0	S of Macon	Calhoun	AL	33.6806°N 86.0640°W	07:37–07:38	0.79 mi (1.27 km)	300 yd (270 m)
EF0	A brief tornado caused minor roof damage to two homes and snapped or uprooted several trees.						
EF2	N of Cheraw	Marion	MS	31.1624°N 89.8809°W	07:50–07:59	6 mi (9.7 km)	150 yd (140 m)
EF2	A cellular tower was knocked over, outbuildings were damaged or destroyed, a home had its roof damaged, a flag pole and a power pole were downed, and numerous trees were snapped or uprooted.						
EF3	S of State Line, MS to E of Tibbie, AL	Greene (MS), Washington (AL)	MS, AL	31.3351°N 88.5049°W	08:27–08:56	20.14 mi (32.41 km)	700 yd (640 m)
EF3	This tornado began near MS 57 in Greene County, where several softwood trees were snapped. The tornado crossed the state line into Washington County and struck Fruitdale, where Fruitdale High School had damage to its roof, windows, and side paneling, and a metal building sustained considerable damage as well. Widespread tree and power line damage was observed throughout Fruitdale before the tornado continued northeastward, strengthening to low-end EF3 intensity as it impacted a wooded area. Numerous large trees were completely mowed down along a nearly 500-yard (460 m) swath, some debarking was observed, and a small farm outbuilding was obliterated. The tornado then weakened to low-end EF2 strength, snapping many additional trees and damaging the roofs of a few homes and a church before dissipating near the small community of Tibbie. In November 2023, this tornado was reanalyzed and had its track receive cosmetic updates based on Planet satellite imagery. The maximum width was also increased from 500 yd (460 m) to 700 yd (640 m).						
EF2	NW of Boylston to SSE of Wetumpka	Elmore, Montgomery	AL	32.4385°N 86.3318°W	09:14–09:28	9.85 mi (15.85 km)	700 yd (640 m)
EF2	2 deaths – A strong tornado struck the Flatwood and Willow Springs communities north of Montgomery. Several mobile homes were heavily damaged or destroyed, and multiple frame homes suffered moderate to severe structural damage. A cinderblock building that housed the community center in Flatwood was destroyed, with only interior walls left standing. Power poles were downed, and many large trees were snapped or uprooted as well. Two fatalities and a serious injury occurred when an uprooted tree fell on a mobile home; and an additional minor injury was also confirmed when an unanchored mobile home was rolled.						
EF2	SW of Tallassee to N of Tukabatchee	Elmore	AL	32.4892°N 86.0017°W	09:38–09:49	6.26 mi (10.07 km)	400 yd (370 m)
EF2	A low-end EF2 tornado touched down shortly after the previous tornado dissipated. A home lost part of its roof and had an exterior wall knocked down, an outbuilding was damaged, and many trees were snapped or uprooted.						
EF0	E of Buckhorn	Pike	AL	31.8216°N 85.7711°W	11:42–11:44	1.42 mi (2.29 km)	150 yd (140 m)
EF0	A weak tornado embedded in a squall line uprooted several trees and broke tree branches.						
EF0	SE of Brundidge	Pike	AL	31.6823°N 85.7535°W	11:45–11:46	0.79 mi (1.27 km)	150 yd (140 m)
EF0	A brief, weak tornado embedded in a squall line downed a few trees.						
EF0	N of Texasville	Barbour	AL	31.7385°N 85.4857°W	12:06–12:17	6.6 mi (10.6 km)	300 yd (270 m)
EF0	Four chicken houses at a chicken farm were significantly damaged, with metal roofing torn off and scattered downwind. A riding arena and a farmhouse on the property sustained minor damage. Many trees were snapped or uprooted, one of which caused a car accident on SR 131.						
EF1	N of Slocomb to WSW of Malvern	Geneva	AL	31.14°N 85.58°W	12:42–12:44	1.8 mi (2.9 km)	50 yd (46 m)
EF1	A house sustained significant roof damage, a carport was damaged, and the rear window was blown out of an SUV. Trees were snapped, and a pole was bent as well.						
EFU	W of Hartsfield	Colquitt	GA	31.22°N 83.99°W	14:26–?	0.1 mi (0.16 km)	25 yd (23 m)
EFU	A barn was damaged.						
EFU	NNW of Funston	Colquitt	GA	31.23°N 83.89°W	14:38–?	0.1 mi (0.16 km)	25 yd (23 m)
EFU	A brief tornado was videoed in a field doing no damage.						

== December ==
Confirmed tornadoes by Enhanced Fujita rating
EFU	EF0	EF1	EF2	EF3	EF4	EF5	Total
6	20	32	20	1	0	0	79

=== December 12 event ===
List of confirmed tornadoes – Monday, December 12, 2022
EF#	Location	County / Parish	State	Start Coord.	Time (UTC)	Path length	Max width
EFU	W of Elmwood	Beaver	OK	36.6188°N 100.6606°W	03:21–03:23	1.22 mi (1.96 km)	50 yd (46 m)
EFU	A brief tornado touched down west of Elmwood with no damage observed.						
EF0	S of Beaver	Beaver	OK	36.6843°N 100.524°W	03:38–03:39	0.66 mi (1.06 km)	50 yd (46 m)
EF0	A brief tornado that struck powerlines but caused no visible damage to them was observed by a few storm chasers south of Beaver.						

=== December 13 event ===
List of confirmed tornadoes – Tuesday, December 13, 2022
EF#	Location	County / Parish	State	Start Coord.	Time (UTC)	Path length	Max width
EFU	SW of Erick	Beckham	OK	35.158°N 99.91°W	06:13	0.2 mi (0.32 km)	40 yd (37 m)
EFU	Storm chasers observed a brief QLCS tornado that resulted in no damage.						
EF1	Duncan	Stephens	OK	34.523°N 97.973°W	10:24–10:26	0.32 mi (0.51 km)	50 yd (46 m)
EF1	A large tree was uprooted and a power pole was snapped on the northeast side of Duncan						
EF2	NW of Cox City	Grady	OK	34.741°N 97.746°W	10:51–10:52	0.6 mi (0.97 km)	50 yd (46 m)
EF2	A home north of Cox City had its roof and second-story exterior walls removed. A barn was also destroyed.						
EF0	NW of Graford	Jack	TX	33.04°N 98.31°W	11:20–11:22	0.23 mi (0.37 km)	30 yd (27 m)
EF0	A brief tornado bent a flag pole, moved small sheds and snapped trees.						
EF2	Wayne	McClain, Cleveland	OK	34.91°N 97.318°W	11:27–11:33	4.9 mi (7.9 km)	300 yd (270 m)
EF2	This tornado touched down in the town of Wayne, causing damage to roofs, trees, and power lines. The tornado exited town and strengthened as it tracked to the north-northeast into a rural area, where a home was completely unroofed and had its exterior walls collapsed. A nearby outbuilding was destroyed as well. The tornado produced additional tree and power line damage as it tracked towards the Canadian River, dissipating just after crossing the river.						
EF2	N of Gorman to NNE of Desdemona	Eastland	TX	32.2965°N 98.6678°W	11:35–11:53	11.13 mi (17.91 km)	355 yd (325 m)
EF2	A high-end EF2 tornado touched down north of Gorman, producing damage to fences and trees. It continued northeast and moved through a large forested area, snapping or uprooting many trees, a few of which sustained some debarking. Farther along the path, a two-story house had a portion of its roof removed and sustained partial collapse of exterior walls, and was also damaged by a falling tree. A covered brick outdoor kitchen was destroyed, and farming equipment was lofted. The tornado then severely damaged a mobile home, collapsing all of its exterior walls. A large metal-framed equipment shed was also destroyed on the property. The tornado continued northeast, producing mainly tree damage before dissipating north-northeast of Desdemona.						
EF0	WSW of Wanette	Pottawatomie	OK	34.938°N 97.116°W	11:46–11:47	0.6 mi (0.97 km)	30 yd (27 m)
EF0	A weak tornado damaged trailers and trees.						
EF1	NE of Hennepin	Garvin	OK	34.511°N 97.34°W	11:55–12:00	4.2 mi (6.8 km)	100 yd (91 m)
EF1	Trees were damaged and the roof was removed from a communications building.						
EF0	NNE of Mineral Wells	Parker	TX	32.8785°N 98.0565°W	12:10–12:13	1.07 mi (1.72 km)	50 yd (46 m)
EF0	A brief, weak tornado damaged trees.						
EF1	ESE of Santo	Palo Pinto	TX	32.5735°N 98.138°W	12:31–12:44	3.7 mi (6.0 km)	230 yd (210 m)
EF1	Multiple outbuilding structures were significantly damaged by this high-end EF1 tornado, and a large metal outbuilding that housed a home gym was destroyed. Trees were downed and tree limbs were snapped, and a house had metal roofing peeled off.						
EF2	SE of Paradise to SE of Decatur	Wise	TX	33.1195°N 97.6563°W	12:59–13:13	9.71 mi (15.63 km)	370 yd (340 m)
EF2	This tornado touched down southeast of Paradise, producing minor tree damage and damaging the roof of a metal shop building. It continued to the northeast and reached mid-range EF2 intensity, snapping trees and tearing the roofs off of homes. Vehicles were also severely damaged and impaled by pieces of flying debris, while barns and storage buildings were damaged or destroyed. The tornado then crossed US 287, causing more tree damage before dissipating. Two people were injured.						
EF0	WSW of Weatherford	Parker	TX	32.7259°N 97.8788°W	13:00–13:10	0.71 mi (1.14 km)	50 yd (46 m)
EF0	A brief high-end EF0 tornado touched down west-southwest of Weatherford, producing damage to trees and a trailer. Multiple 18-wheelers were flipped over as the tornado crossed I-20, and a warehouse building had an exterior wall collapsed inward. Minor tree damage was observed in a subdivision shortly before the tornado dissipated.						
EF1	S of Bluff Dale	Erath	TX	32.3331°N 98.0242°W	13:34–13:37	0.66 mi (1.06 km)	44 yd (40 m)
EF1	Numerous trees were snapped or uprooted, and a home sustained significant roof loss. A detached garage was unroofed and had its garage door blown in.						
EF0	NW of Callisburg	Cooke	TX	33.7232°N 97.0697°W	13:44–13:46	0.44 mi (0.71 km)	150 yd (140 m)
EF0	A brief high-end EF0 tornado touched down northwest of Callisburg, where a home sustained minor roof damage, and a window at the residence was broken after being struck by a tree limb. Considerable tree damage occurred near the home and elsewhere along the path before the tornado dissipated.						
EF0	Westworth Village	Tarrant	TX	32.7693°N 97.4337°W	14:10–14:12	0.81 mi (1.30 km)	25 yd (23 m)
EF0	This brief tornado touched down at Naval Air Station Joint Reserve Base Fort Worth, where metal roofing was torn off a warehouse building and scattered across a taxiway. A fitness facility at the base was damaged as well. This was the first of six tornadoes produced by this storm in the Fort Worth area.						
EF1	Southwestern Sansom Park	Tarrant	TX	32.7945°N 97.4096°W	14:14–14:16	0.18 mi (0.29 km)	40 yd (37 m)
EF1	A brief tornado touched down at the southwestern edge of Sansom Park, snapping trees and tree branches and damaging some fences. This was the second of six tornadoes produced by this storm in the Fort Worth area.						
EF0	Northern Fort Worth	Tarrant	TX	32.8294°N 97.3387°W	14:18–14:20	0.34 mi (0.55 km)	25 yd (23 m)
EF0	A brief tornado touched down in an industrial area of Fort Worth to the south of Blue Mound, knocking over a few rail cars. Minor tree damage was observed in the area as well. This was the third of six tornadoes produced by this storm in the Fort Worth area.						
EF1	North Richland Hills	Tarrant	TX	32.8863°N 97.2055°W	14:34–14:40	1.85 mi (2.98 km)	40 yd (37 m)
EF1	A low-end EF1 tornado touched down in the northeastern part North Richland Hills, causing damage to trees and the roofs of homes in a residential area. Several businesses had their roofs damaged as it continued to the northeast. The tornado then moved through another residential neighborhood, where additional tree and roof shingle damage was observed, and dissipated shortly after. This was the fourth of six tornadoes produced by this storm in the Fort Worth area.						
EF1	Grapevine	Tarrant	TX	32.9282°N 97.1016°W	14:42–14:49	3.11 mi (5.01 km)	150 yd (140 m)
EF1	A high-end EF1 tornado touched down in Grapevine, where an office building suffered heavy roof damage, an automotive service building had an exterior wall blown out, a Discount Tire store sustained extensive damage to its roof decking and windows, and large sections of roof were torn off of a Sam's Club. An 18-wheeler was flipped over in the Sam's Club parking lot, and power poles were also damaged. The tornado was caught on video as it crossed SH 114 before it moved into a residential area, damaging trees and causing minor roof damage to homes. Elsewhere, a car wash was largely destroyed, a restaurant had roofing and awnings ripped off, HVAC units on the roof of Grapevine Middle School were damaged, and sheet metal was wrapped around power lines. A large warehouse that housed the Grapevine Service Center had multiple garage doors blown out and sustained severe roof damage, and a small truck was overturned nearby. Additional damage to trees, roofs, and garage doors occurred before the tornado dissipated. Five people were injured. This was the fifth of six tornadoes produced by this storm in the Fort Worth area.						
EF1	Northeastern Grapevine	Tarrant	TX	32.965°N 97.044°W	14:49–14:51	0.75 mi (1.21 km)	100 yd (91 m)
EF1	A brief tornado touched down in northeastern Grapevine, damaging the roof and walls of the Grapevine Mills Mall. Trees were damaged, along with the roofs of some apartment buildings. This was the last of six tornadoes produced by this storm in the Fort Worth area.						
EF2	W of Blue Ridge to WNW of Bailey	Collin, Fannin	TX	33.2981°N 96.4287°W	15:47–16:13	17.61 mi (28.34 km)	225 yd (206 m)
EF2	A strong tornado touched down west of Blue Ridge, causing damage to trees and destroying an outbuilding. Moving through the north edge of town, the tornado destroyed a mobile home, damaged a few other buildings and a cemetery, and impacted the athletic field at Blue Ridge High School, where fences and bleachers were damaged, dugouts were destroyed, and metal light poles were bent to the ground. The tornado continued to the northeast of Blue Ridge, where a house sustained destruction of its attached garage, other homes sustained significant roof damage, outbuildings were destroyed, and several mobile homes were heavily damaged or destroyed as well. As the tornado passed near Leonard, several homes sustained roof damage and two were completely unroofed, one of which sustained some collapse of exterior walls. A water treatment plant in this area was also damaged and an office trailer was completely destroyed, with its undercarriage being twisted. The tornado downed several trees before it lifted along SH 11 west-northwest of Bailey. Two people were injured.						
EF1	NW of Wolfe City	Hunt, Fannin	TX	33.3566°N 96.1333°W	16:12–16:22	6.6 mi (10.6 km)	50 yd (46 m)
EF1	A low-end EF1 tornado damaged trees and destroyed several sheds. The exterior wall of a mobile home was pushed in and impaled by a piece of wood, and a small trailer was thrown 100 yd (91 m). The tornado also moved through a solar farm, destroying numerous solar panels at that location.						
EF2	W of Petty to W of Hopewell	Lamar	TX	33.6144°N 95.8268°W	16:45–16:57	10.21 mi (16.43 km)	200 yd (180 m)
EF2	A low-end EF2 tornado significantly damaged a commercial building, which lost half of its roof. Siding panels were removed from the structure, and metal support beams were ripped from their anchors. The tornado also damaged two nearby metal buildings. Elsewhere, a metal-framed combination barn/residence was mostly destroyed with the beams being severely twisted, and some other homes were damaged to a lesser degree. Outbuildings and trees were damaged along the path as well.						
EF2	NW of De Berry to SSW of Waskom	Panola, Harrison	TX	32.3323°N 94.2154°W	21:38–21:52	9.15 mi (14.73 km)	460 yd (420 m)
EF2	A low-end EF2 wedge tornado touched down northwest of De Berry, snapping and uprooting approximately 200 large softwood trees. Continuing northeast, the roofs of a few homes were damaged, a metal outbuilding was damaged, and numerous additional trees were snapped. The tornado continued to snap and uproot trees and inflicted minor roof damage to a house as it crossed into Harrison County, passing near Elysian Fields. Additional trees were downed beyond this point, and a couple of outbuildings were damaged or destroyed. A two-story house had a substantial amount of roofing torn off shortly before the tornado dissipated.						
EF2	NW of Keachi	Caddo	LA	32.221°N 94.0102°W	22:36–22:41	3.46 mi (5.57 km)	700 yd (640 m)
EF2	2 deaths – A high-end EF2 tornado touched down northwest of Keachi and impacted the small community of Four Forks, where multiple mobile homes were obliterated and debris was strewn throughout the area. One mobile home was lifted and tossed to the northeast, completely destroying the structure and killing the two occupants, including a woman whose body was thrown 200 yd (180 m). A few other residences were damaged to a lesser degree, and numerous large trees were snapped or uprooted. At least two people were injured.						
EF3	Northern Farmerville	Union	LA	32.772°N 92.4683°W	02:23–02:34	9.06 mi (14.58 km)	500 yd (460 m)
EF3	See section on this tornado – 14 people were injured.						
EF1	E of Winnsboro	Franklin, Madison	LA	32.1807°N 91.5396°W	04:19–04:35	11.12 mi (17.90 km)	300 yd (270 m)
EF1	A home was shifted off its block foundation, with a part of its roof ripped off and most of its windows shattered as well. An irrigation pivot was overturned, a few buildings at a camp site were damaged, other structures had their roofs peeled back, and some carports were blown away. Trees were snapped and uprooted, one of which fell on and crushed a car.						
EF1	Northwestern Forest Hill to S of Woodworth	Rapides	LA	31.0599°N 92.5369°W	04:26–04:29	2.74 mi (4.41 km)	100 yd (91 m)
EF1	A house and a plant nursery were damaged, and numerous trees were snapped or uprooted.						
EF1	SSE of Woodworth to S of Alexandria	Rapides	LA	31.1208°N 92.4855°W	04:31–04:37	7.3 mi (11.7 km)	150 yd (140 m)
EF1	Vehicles were flipped, and metal buildings sustained considerable damage at the Louisiana Department of Agriculture and Forestry as a result of this high-end EF1 tornado, which touched down after the previous one dissipated. A large office supply warehouse was heavily damaged near US 167, and trees were snapped. A house was damaged at a farm shortly before the tornado dissipated, while several metal grain silos and numerous outbuildings were damaged or destroyed on the property. A large truck was overturned at this location as well.						
EF2	Anguilla	Sharkey	MS	32.97°N 90.84°W	05:11–05:14	1.06 mi (1.71 km)	250 yd (230 m)
EF2	A brief but strong tornado impacted Anguilla and destroyed multiple outbuilding structures, including one that was well-constructed and had several hundred pound concrete anchors ripped out of the ground and thrown about 50 yards (46 m). Several manufactured homes were rolled and destroyed, and some frame homes and the community center in town sustained roof damage. A large metal warehouse building had exterior wall panels blown out, numerous trees were downed, and three people were injured.						
EF2	NW of Valley Park	Issaquena, Sharkey	MS	32.60°N 91.00°W	05:21–05:36	10.26 mi (16.51 km)	400 yd (370 m)
EF2	This strong tornado impacted the Kelso community. Numerous farm outbuildings were destroyed, a grain bin was tossed, and semi-trailers were rolled. Trees were snapped and uprooted as well.						
EF1	N of Belzoni	Humphreys	MS	33.24°N 90.50°W	05:56–06:00	3.15 mi (5.07 km)	200 yd (180 m)
EF1	Two small outbuildings were destroyed, one of which had its concrete footing pulled out of the ground and thrown, and a third outbuilding was damaged. An irrigation pivot was overturned, trees were uprooted, and tree branches were snapped.						

=== December 14 event ===
List of confirmed tornadoes – Wednesday, December 14, 2022
EF#	Location	County / Parish	State	Start Coord.	Time (UTC)	Path length	Max width
EF0	E of Tchula	Holmes	MS	33.12°N 90.19°W	07:04–07:09	5.91 mi (9.51 km)	100 yd (91 m)
EF0	A brief tornado caused tree and vegetation damage in the Hillside National Wildlife Refuge.						
EF1	E of Natchez	Adams	MS	31.5°N 91.27°W	08:54–09:04	4.61 mi (7.42 km)	300 yd (270 m)
EF1	A manufactured home, a travel trailer, and multiple sheds were damaged. Some trees were snapped or uprooted as well.						
EF1	SE of Fayette	Jefferson	MS	31.61°N 91.04°W	09:24–09:34	5.08 mi (8.18 km)	300 yd (270 m)
EF1	Several trees were snapped or uprooted, two homes sustained roof damage, and a shed was damaged as well.						
EF0	NW of Tallahala	Forrest	MS	31.4°N 89.17°W	10:44	0.2 mi (0.32 km)	50 yd (46 m)
EF0	The roof of a small shed was ripped off, while the roof of a hay barn was damaged. A trailer was tossed around 100 feet (30 m), and some trees were snapped. A separate, stronger tornado occurred a half mile west of this tornado a few hours later.						
EF1	NW of Good Hope	Jones	MS	31.54°N 89.04°W	11:09–11:18	4.08 mi (6.57 km)	50 yd (46 m)
EF1	Trees were snapped or uprooted along the path, and power lines were downed.						
EF0	Southwestern Terry	Hinds	MS	32.08°N 90.32°W	11:16–11:18	0.8 mi (1.3 km)	70 yd (64 m)
EF0	A brief tornado caused minor tree damage at the southwestern outskirts of Terry.						
EF1	NW of Georgetown	Copiah, Simpson	MS	31.87°N 90.23°W	11:48–11:57	6.43 mi (10.35 km)	150 yd (140 m)
EF1	Trees were uprooted along the path of this tornado.						
EF1	E of Canton	Rankin, Madison	MS	32.55°N 89.89°W	12:03–12:18	9.04 mi (14.55 km)	1,000 yd (910 m)
EF1	A large tornado snapped or uprooted numerous trees, some of which fell onto power lines.						
EF0	NW of Puckett	Rankin	MS	32.10°N 89.90°W	12:30–12:34	4.15 mi (6.68 km)	500 yd (460 m)
EF0	Several outbuildings were damaged, including a hay barn that was collapsed, and another structure that sustained damage to its metal roll-up door. Skirting on a manufactured home was blown off, and trees sustained minor damage.						
EF2	WNW of Polkville	Rankin	MS	32.20°N 89.79°W	12:44–12:50	3.23 mi (5.20 km)	250 yd (230 m)
EF2	A low-end EF2 tornado touched down west-northwest of Polkville, destroying four chicken houses. The debris from the chicken houses was strewn for several miles to the northeast. A few smaller trees were uprooted or damaged as the tornado crossed MS 43. The tornado continued northeast, producing minor tree damage and dissipating just before reaching the Smith County line.						
EF1	SE of Forest	Scott	MS	32.28°N 89.46°W	13:38–13:45	5.43 mi (8.74 km)	500 yd (460 m)
EF1	A few homes sustained considerable roof damage, some trees were snapped or uprooted, and many tree branches were snapped.						
EF1	NW of Lake	Scott	MS	32.38°N 89.35°W	13:58–14:00	0.85 mi (1.37 km)	200 yd (180 m)
EF1	Trees were snapped or uprooted, and a few barns were damaged.						
EF1	W of Mount Olive	Jefferson Davis, Simpson	MS	31.74°N 89.82°W	13:59–14:09	6.32 mi (10.17 km)	250 yd (230 m)
EF1	A few homes sustained roof damage, and some outbuildings were damaged as well. Numerous trees were damaged and uprooted along the path, and a carport was also damaged.						
EFU	NE of Ville Platte	Evangeline	LA	30.7663°N 92.2172°W	15:25–15:26	0.01 mi (0.016 km)	1 yd (0.91 m)
EFU	A storm spotter observed and photographed a tornado that touched down in a remote swampy area near Ville Platte. The area where the tornado occurred was not accessible to damage surveyors, and no intensity rating was assigned.						
EF2	Southeastern New Iberia	Iberia	LA	29.9533°N 91.8382°W	16:50–16:59	5.2 mi (8.4 km)	300 yd (270 m)
EF2	A high-end EF2 multiple-vortex tornado was broadcast live on KADN-TV as it impacted the southeastern part of New Iberia, causing significant damage. 20 to 25 mobile homes were damaged at a mobile home park, including four that were destroyed. Multiple homes and apartment buildings were significantly damaged, several of which sustained loss of roofs and exterior walls, while a few businesses were also severely damaged. The New Iberia Medical Center was heavily damaged, where roofing was torn off, numerous windows were blown out on multiple floors, and some damage to interior walls occurred. Other buildings at the medical complex were also damaged, along with several vehicles in the parking lots. The tornado would lift at Sam Snead Drive, doing low-end EF1 damage to one building. Along its path, numerous trees were snapped and sixteen people were injured.						
EFU	SSW of New Iberia	Iberia	LA	29.9523°N 91.8281°W	16:52–16:53	0.2 mi (0.32 km)	10 yd (9.1 m)
EFU	A satellite tornado to the previous tornado was confirmed using satellite imagery and video. The tornado touched down in an open field near the start of the main tornado's track and caused no damage. 3 to 4 other weak potential satellites visible on KADN-TV video formed in the same area, but were not rated by the NWS.						
EF1	SE of Catahoula	St. Martin	LA	30.1120°N 91.6390°W	17:16–17:17	0.09 mi (0.14 km)	50 yd (46 m)
EF1	A brief tornado overturned a mobile home and damaged some trees.						
EF2	SW of Garlandville to NW of Hickory to SW of Collinsville	Jasper, Newton, Lauderdale	MS	32.19°N 89.21°W	18:09–18:55	25.3 mi (40.7 km)	600 yd (550 m)
EF2	A strong, long-tracked tornado snapped or uprooted countless large trees as it moved through forested areas. A couple of sheds were heavily damaged or destroyed, a few homes sustained roof damage, and power lines were downed.						
EF1	SSW of Loranger to N of Osceola	Tangipahoa	LA	30.58°N 90.37°W	17:58–18:10	6.84 mi (11.01 km)	50 yd (46 m)
EF1	This tornado touched down and damaged sheds, snapped or uprooted hardwood trees, and tore down residential fencing as it moved northeast. The tornado reached its peak intensity, causing tree damage and defoliation in wooded and field areas. It continued northeast, with video and satellite imagery confirming damage before lifting near LA-445.						
EF2	NW of Tallahala	Forrest	MS	31.40°N 89.18°W	19:14–19:16	1.93 mi (3.11 km)	100 yd (91 m)
EF2	Numerous trees were snapped or uprooted, including one that fell on a manufactured home. The roof was ripped off of a small outbuilding.						
EF1	SE of Marion	Lauderdale	MS	32.31°N 88.55°W	19:57–20:11	8.14 mi (13.10 km)	50 yd (46 m)
EF1	The roofs were ripped off of an outbuilding and a hay barn, and another structure also sustained roof damage. Trees were snapped or uprooted as well.						
EF2	NE of Shubuta	Clarke	MS	31.90°N 88.65°W	20:19–20:47	19.07 mi (30.69 km)	1,000 yd (910 m)
EF2	A large high-end EF2 tornado impacted the Mannassa community. It destroyed a small wood-frame home and tore much of the roofing off of a second house. A manufactured home was completely destroyed, another manufactured home sustained roof and siding damage, and an outbuilding was also damaged. Countless large trees and many power poles were snapped along the path.						
EF2	Killona to NE of Montz	St. Charles	LA	29.98°N 90.52°W	20:20–20:33	9.85 mi (15.85 km)	75 yd (69 m)
EF2	1 death – This tornado first touched down at the Nelson Coleman Correctional Center, where metal roofing was torn off. The roof of a nearby manufactured home was damaged as well, along with some power poles. The tornado reached its peak intensity as it struck Killona, where multiple frame homes had roofs and exterior walls torn off, a few were shifted off their foundations, and some mobile homes were completely destroyed, resulting in the death of a woman. One mobile home was tossed into a neighboring residence, a FEMA trailer and a car were flipped, while trees and power poles in town were snapped. After crossing the Mississippi River into Montz, the tornado completely unroofed a couple of homes, shifted a mobile home off its foundation, and snapped large tree branches. Several vehicles had their windows shattered at a steel fabricating business as well. Continuing past Montz, the tornado ripped the porch off a house, downed trees and tree limbs, and damaged or destroyed some outbuildings. High-resolution satellite coupled with radar imagery showed turned east-northeast causing tree damage and defoliation. The tornado then likely continued onto Lake Pontchartrain, where it then dissipated. Eight people were injured.						
EF0	E of Abita Springs to S of Talisheek	St. Tammany	LA	30.45°N 89.97°W	20:55–21:05	7.7 mi (12.4 km)	50 yd (46 m)
EF0	A weak tornado tracked through rural areas of St. Tammany Parish, primarily causing tree damage. This tornado was confirmed in November 2023, from a combination of damage reports, radar analysis, and high-resolution satellite data.						
EF0	Southern Houma	Terrebonne	LA	29.5651°N 90.7226°W	21:02–21:05	1.63 mi (2.62 km)	50 yd (46 m)
EF0	A high-end EF0 tornado rolled an RV trailer, downed some fences, removed all the roofing panels from an entrance shed, and peeled some of the siding and roof off of a large metal warehouse. The tornado also tore the front porch and some roofing panels from a home, and inflicted siding damage to other homes in a residential area before it dissipated. Tree branches were snapped along the path.						
EF1	NE of Ward	Sumter	AL	32.3698°N 88.2732°W	21:17–21:24	4.40 mi (7.08 km)	225 yd (206 m)
EF1	Two homes sustained minor roof damage, farm structures sustained roof and minor structural damage from flying debris, and trees were damaged.						
EF1	E of Lumberton	Forrest	MS	30.98°N 89.33°W	21:28–21:36	4.5 mi (7.2 km)	50 yd (46 m)
EF1	A pig shed was destroyed, the roof was ripped off a hay barn, and several trees were snapped or uprooted.						
EF2	Marrero to Arabi	Jefferson, Orleans, St. Bernard	LA	29.8773°N 90.1239°W	21:49–22:06	10.59 mi (17.04 km)	200 yd (180 m)
EF2	A strong tornado was broadcast live on WDSU as it caused significant damage in the New Orleans metro area. The tornado impacted the suburbs and neighborhoods of Marrero, Harvey, Gretna, Algiers, and Arabi, damaging some of the same areas that were struck by an EF3 tornado on March 22, 2022, especially on the south side of Arabi where the damage paths crossed. Numerous structures were damaged or destroyed along the tornado's path, including multiple homes that were unroofed, had exterior walls collapsed, or were shifted from their foundations. A brewery housed in a metal building in Arabi was rebuilt after being destroyed by the March EF3 tornado, only to be destroyed once again by this tornado. A small, unanchored house and a church were pushed off their foundations and destroyed, and some apartment buildings sustained extensive roof and fascia damage. Sets of anchored metal bleachers were ripped from their bolts at Archbishop Shaw Junior High School, while West Jefferson High School sustained roof and window damage. The front façade of a Winn Dixie grocery store was collapsed, trees and power poles were downed, and signs were destroyed. Several businesses and industrial buildings were also damaged, HVAC units were ripped off the roof of a hotel, and a semi-truck and an RV were flipped as well. Ten people were injured, with approximately $150 million in damage confirmed.						
EF0	NW of Silver Run	Pearl River, Stone	MS	30.725°N 89.3626°W	21:56–22:03	2.02 mi (3.25 km)	75 yd (69 m)
EF0	Multiple trees and two sheds were damaged.						
EFU	NE of Shell Beach	St. Bernard	LA	29.902°N 89.592°W	22:43–22:52	3.95 mi (6.36 km)	50 yd (46 m)
EFU	A post-event analysis revealed a defined, narrow damage path in the marsh of the Biloxi State Wildlife Management area. KLIX data showed a strong velocity couplet and a Tornado Debris Signature (TDS) between 5:44 and 5:52 PM CST. The exact path length and intensity are unknown due to the lack of damage indicators.						
EFU	N of Happy Jack	Plaquemines	LA	29.55°N 89.73°W	23:01-23:12	7.14 mi (11.49 km)	50 yd (46 m)
EFU	A post-event analysis revealed a defined, narrow damage path in the marsh near Felicity Bay. KLIX data showed a strong velocity couplet and a Tornado Debris Signature (TDS) between 6:01 and 6:06 PM CST. The exact path length and intensity are unknown due to the lack of damage indicators.						
EF2	W of Silver Cross to ENE of Bladon Springs	Washington, Choctaw	AL	31.68°N 88.214°W	23:40–23:48	3.36 mi (5.41 km)	140 yd (130 m)
EF2	A high-end EF2 tornado touched down west of Silver Cross and continued to the north of Frankville, snapping or uprooting countless large trees as it moved through areas of dense forest. Total deforestation occurred in the most severely affected area, with nearly all trees in the direct path being snapped at their bases. This tornado then continued northeast, crossing US 84 and downing several large tree branches before dissipating. In November 2023, this tornado was reanalyzed and received cosmetic updates based on Worldview satellite imagery.						
EF2	E of Bladon Springs	Choctaw	AL	31.7296°N 88.1707°W	23:49–23:52	1.79 mi (2.88 km)	120 yd (110 m)
EF2	Shortly after the previous tornado dissipated, this tornado touched down in a wooded area and almost immediately intensified to EF2 strength, snapping or uprooting numerous large trees. In November 2023, this tornado was reanalyzed and had its starting point further southeast based on Planet and Worldview satellite imagery.						
EF1	Western Biloxi	Harrison	MS	30.3908°N 88.9702°W	23:52–23:55	2.31 mi (3.72 km)	100 yd (91 m)
EF1	A tornadic waterspout moved onshore in the western part of Biloxi, snapping or uprooting many trees, many of which fell on power lines. One tree landed on and damaged the roof of a pavilion, and the roof of a metal shed was ripped off. Unsecured bleachers were tossed 50 yards (46 m), a few shingles were torn from military housing, and grave markers were damaged at the Biloxi National Cemetery. The most severe damage occurred to the VA Gulf Coast Health Care System campus, where two windows were shattered, the roof of a small building was peeled off, and an outbuilding structure collapsed.						
EF0	Apalachicola National Forest	Liberty	FL	30.07°N 84.92°W	00:54-01:05	3.57 mi (5.75 km)	25 yd (23 m)
EF0	A tornadic debris signature was observed on radar and tree damage was confirmed.						
EF0	NNW of Carrabelle	Franklin	FL	29.9233°N 84.7343°W	01:54–01:56	0.33 mi (0.53 km)	210 yd (190 m)
EF0	Multiple pine trees were snapped or uprooted by this brief and weak tornado.						
EF0	SE of DeFuniak Springs	Walton	FL	30.678°N 86.029°W	01:55-02:00	1.61 mi (2.59 km)	25 yd (23 m)
EF0	Several trees were blown down.						
EF1	NW of Sopchoppy	Wakulla	FL	30.053°N 84.548°W	02:29–02:42	5.69 mi (9.16 km)	75 yd (69 m)
EF1	A home sustained roof damage, and several pine trees were snapped.						
EF0	S of Tallahassee	Wakulla	FL	30.274°N 84.348°W	03:14-03:18	1.5 mi (2.4 km)	25 yd (23 m)
EF0	Trees were blown down.						

=== December 15 event ===
List of confirmed tornadoes – Thursday, December 15, 2022
EF#	Location	County / Parish	State	Start Coord.	Time (UTC)	Path length	Max width
EF2	SW of Doerun to Ticknor	Colquitt	GA	31.3039°N 83.9463°W	10:27–10:32	1.96 mi (3.15 km)	280 yd (260 m)
EF2	This strong tornado touched down southwest of Doerun, causing damage to trees and a mobile home. Continuing northeast, it snapped and uprooted numerous large trees and caused minor roof damage to a home. The tornado then crossed SR 270, causing significant damage to a cotton gin facility. More trees were either snapped or uprooted before the tornado dissipated shortly after.						
EF1	Southern Masaryktown to SW of Ridge Manor	Pasco, Hernando	FL	28.4310°N 82.4729°W	15:48–16:03	10.3 mi (16.6 km)	100 yd (91 m)
EF1	A low-end EF1 tornado touched down in the southern part of Masaryktown, causing minor damage to a home and snapping trees. Additional tree damage occurred farther along the path before the tornado dissipated.						
EF1	NE of South Pasadena	Pinellas	FL	27.7744°N 82.7345°W	17:01–17:05	1.88 mi (3.03 km)	100 yd (91 m)
EF1	A short-lived EF1 tornado touched down south of Kenneth City damaging the roofs of a few homes, a daycare center, and a church. Two people were injured.						
EF0	North Port	Sarasota	FL	27.07°N 82.22°W	20:15–20:17	0.14 mi (0.23 km)	100 yd (91 m)
EF0	A brief high-end EF0 tornado uprooted trees and caused pool cage damage to homes in North Port.						

=== December 29 event ===
List of confirmed tornadoes – Thursday, December 29, 2022
EF#	Location	County / Parish	State	Start Coord.	Time (UTC)	Path length	Max width
EF1	W of Fred	Tyler	TX	30.5840°N 94.2611°W	22:08–22:09	0.42 mi (0.68 km)	75 yd (69 m)
EF1	A BBQ shack was heavily damaged with its awning destroyed. A pontoon boat was ripped off a trailer and thrown 25 yd (23 m) into a pine tree. Two mobile homes sustained minor damage. Trees were snapped or uprooted along the tornado's path.						

=== December 30 event ===
List of confirmed tornadoes – Friday, December 30, 2022
EF#	Location	County / Parish	State	Start Coord.	Time (UTC)	Path length	Max width
EF1	S of Bogue Chitto	Lincoln	MS	31.38°N 90.55°W	12:52–13:01	8.29 mi (13.34 km)	100 yd (91 m)
EF1	Dozens of trees were damaged or downed; some of these trees downed several power poles and landed on a shed. This tornado had an average forward speed of 59.3 miles per hour (95.4 km/h).						

== See also ==
- Tornadoes of 2022
- List of United States tornadoes from July to October 2022
- List of United States tornadoes from January to February 2023
