= Tornado outbreak of December 12–15, 2022 =

Late-season tornado outbreak in the Southern United States

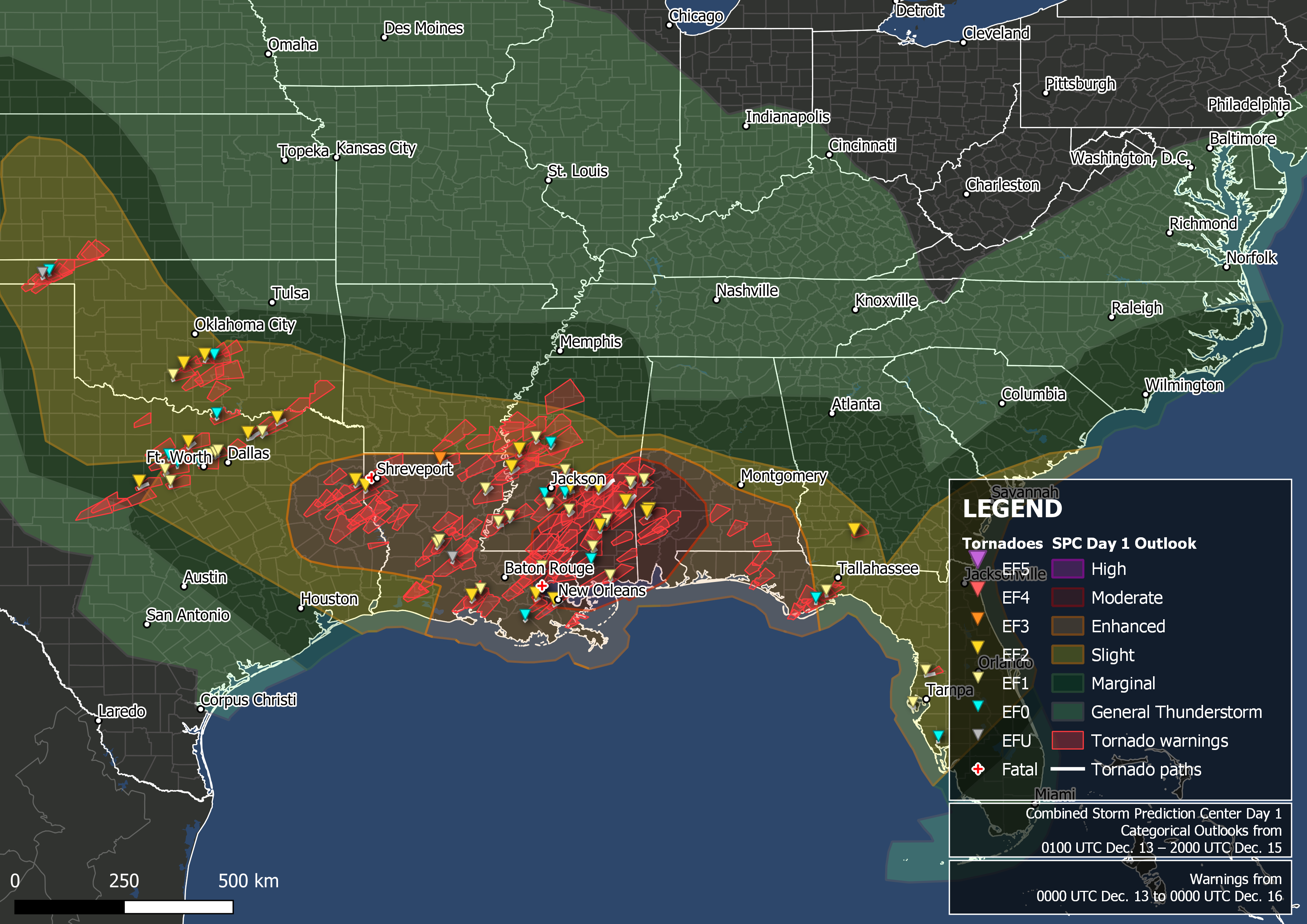
- Map of tornado warnings and confirmed tornadoes from the outbreak

Meteorological history
- Date: December 12–15, 2022

Category 4 "Crippling" winter storm
- Regional snowfall index: 15.80 (NOAA)
- Max. snowfall: 48 in (120 cm) in Cheyenne Crossing, South Dakota on December 13–15

Tornado outbreak
- Tornadoes: 77
- Max. rating: EF3 tornado
- Duration: 2 days, 17 hours, and 54 minutes
- Highest winds: Tornadic – 140 mph (230 km/h) (Farmerville, Louisiana EF3)
- Largest hail: 2.50 in (6.4 cm) in multiple locations on December 12 and 13

Overall effects
- Fatalities: 3 fatalities (+3 non-tornadic), 64 injuries
- Damage: >$164.19 million (Per NOAA NCEI); $345 million (Per Aon)
- Part of the tornado outbreaks of 2022 and 2022–23 North American winter

A four-day tornado outbreak affected the Central and Southern United States in mid-December 2022. The outbreak produced strong tornadoes in Oklahoma, Texas, Louisiana, Mississippi, Alabama, and Georgia, resulting in severe damage and three fatalities. On December 13, a high-end EF1 tornado was caught on video from multiple angles as it caused considerable damage in Grapevine, Texas, where five people were injured, and multiple EF2 tornadoes caused significant damage in other parts of Texas and Oklahoma that morning. Two large EF2 tornadoes occurred near DeBerry, Texas and Keachi, Louisiana to the southwest of Shreveport, Louisiana, with the second one causing severe damage and two fatalities. An EF3 tornado struck the northern fringes of Farmerville, causing major structural damage and 14 injuries.

Multiple strong tornadoes occurred across parts of the Gulf Coast region on December 14, and another fatality was confirmed in St. Charles Parish, Louisiana as a result of an EF2 tornado that struck Killona. Another damaging EF2 tornado impacted the New Orleans metro, following a path similar to a high-end EF3 tornado from March 22, 2022. A total of 77 tornadoes were confirmed, making this the fourth largest outbreak on record for the month of December, with the first and third being recorded in 2021, and the second being recorded in 2024. In addition, this tornado outbreak gave Oklahoma their most active December for tornadoes on record.

== Meteorological synopsis ==
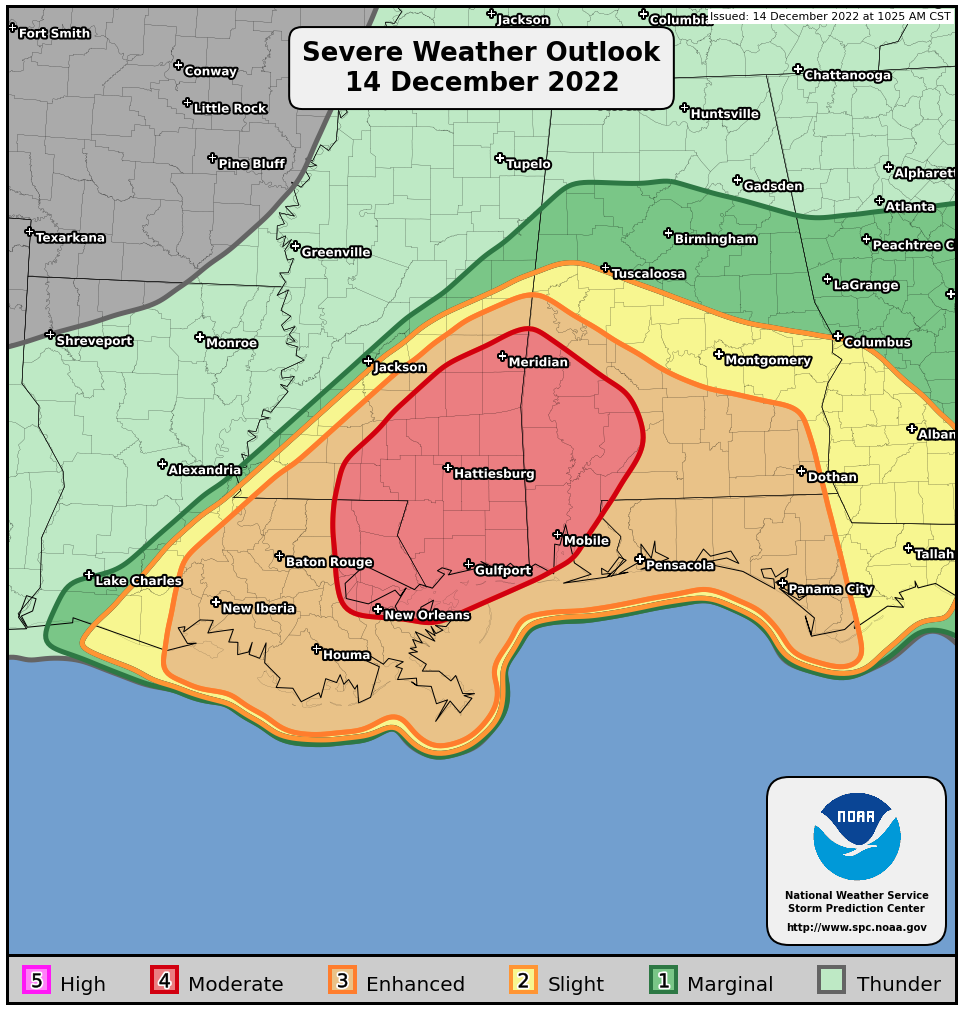
The SPC Severe Weather Outlook for December 14, 2022.

On December 12, the Storm Prediction Center outlined a level 2/Slight risk of severe weather for parts of Southwestern Kansas, Western Oklahoma, and Northern Texas. A brief window for discrete supercells was forecasted, with a risk for all hazards (tornadoes, damaging winds, and large hail) before a transition to a linear mode with a risk for embedded tornadoes and damaging winds. A few supercells developed, producing two weak tornadoes in Oklahoma, neither of which caused any damage. On December 13, as the associated longwave trough ejected eastwards, the Storm Prediction Center outlined a level 3/Enhanced risk of severe weather across eastern Texas, much of Louisiana, and southwestern sections of Mississippi. Environmental conditions were expected to favor the development of semi-discrete supercell thunderstorm structures, with an attendant risk for strong (EF2+) tornadoes. A broader level 2/Slight risk encompassed a larger share of the South Plains, particularly around the Dallas–Fort Worth metroplex where some questions about the level of instability existed but wind shear profiles were conducive for severe weather. During the pre-dawn hours, a broken line of atmospheric convection with embedded supercell structures progressed eastward across North Texas. Here, temperatures in the mid- to upper 60s Fahrenheit overlapped with dewpoints in the low to mid-60s, contributing to modest surface convective available potential energy of 500–1,000 J/kg. Combined with strong shear profiles, atmospheric conditions led to the development of several tornadoes across the Dallas–Fort Worth metroplex throughout the morning hours.

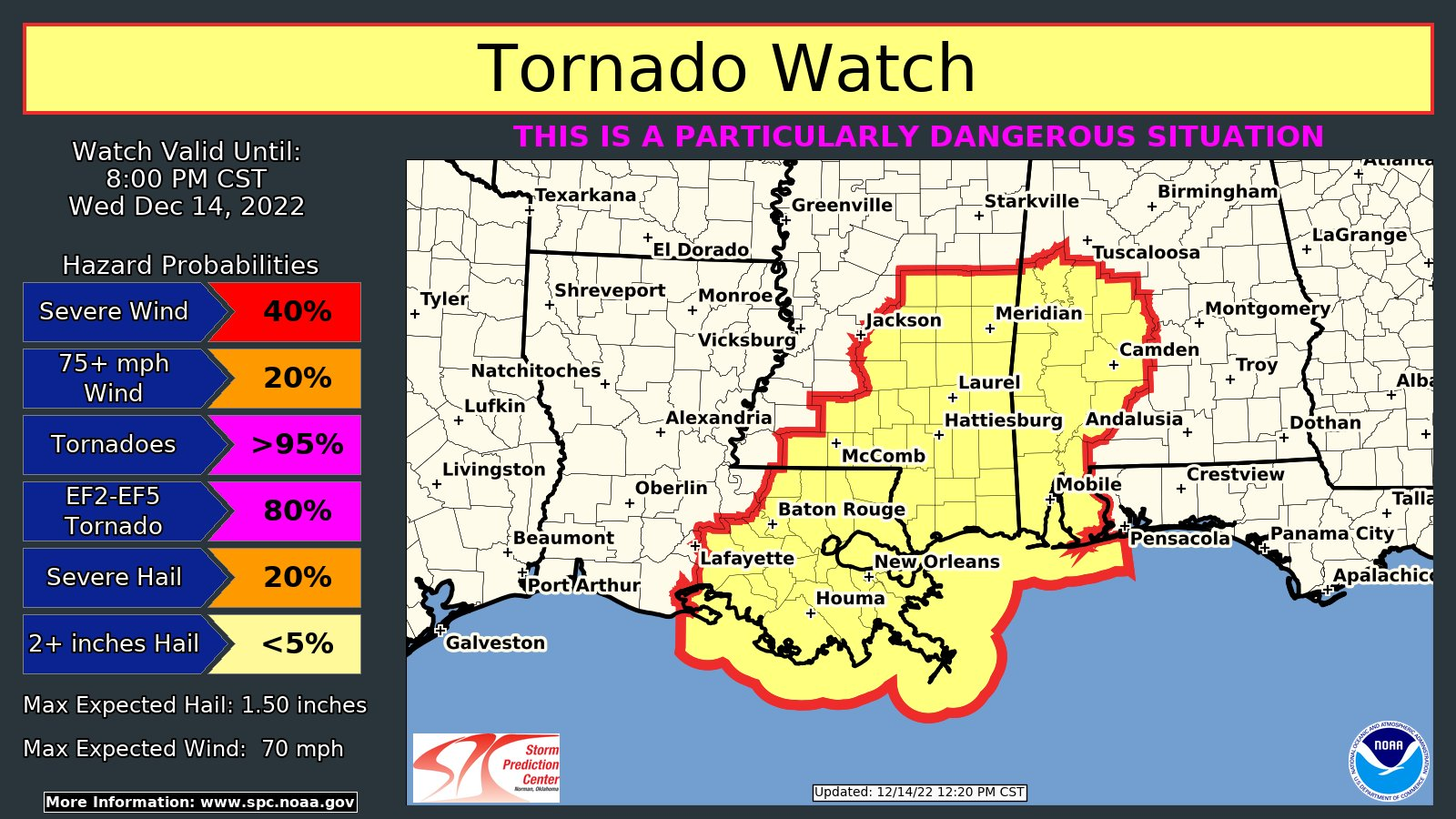
A Particularly Dangerous Situation Tornado Watch on December 14, 2022

By the early afternoon hours, a surface low-pressure area moved into northeastern Texas, supporting a cold front to the southwest and a warm front to the southeast. In the warm sector of this low, temperatures climbed to upwards of the mid-70s while dewpoints reached the upper 60s; this contributed to mid-level CAPE around 1,000 J/kg. Discrete supercells developed within this environment, tracking northeastward with time. As these storms overspread northern and central Louisiana into the afternoon hours, forecasters warned of the potential for renewed supercell development given the approach of the upper-level trough, both in Louisiana as well as Mississippi. All the while, the SPC renewed a level 3/Enhanced risk valid for December 14 across the Gulf Coast, continuing to highlight a large area for the potential of long-lived supercells capable of producing strong tornadoes. With time, discrete activity across the region congealed into an eastward-moving line of convection across portions of Louisiana and Mississippi. However, as the shortwave trough progressed eastward, strengthening wind fields in a warm sector increasingly destabilized by daytime heating, the SPC became increasingly concerned about the potential for this line to break down into discrete cells. The potential for numerous tornadic supercells to develop prompted the issuance of a level 4/Moderate risk across southeastern Louisiana, southern Mississippi, and western/southern Alabama.

As expected, numerous discrete supercells developed across the open warm sector in eastern Louisiana and southern Mississippi, where forecasters outlined a Particularly Dangerous Situation tornado watch and warned of the potential for a few intense tornadoes. These cells eventually congealed into a line of five or six dominant supercells. As the threat area shifted eastward with time, additional supercells developed in the northern Gulf of Mexico. These thunderstorms progressed northeastward into the Florida Panhandle, southern Alabama, and southwestern Georgia.

== Confirmed tornadoes ==
Confirmed tornadoes by Enhanced Fujita rating
| EFU | EF0 | EF1 | EF2 | EF3 | EF4 | EF5 | Total |
|---|---|---|---|---|---|---|---|
| 6 | 20 | 30 | 20 | 1 | 0 | 0 | 77 |

=== December 12 event ===
List of confirmed tornadoes – Monday, December 12, 2022 (Note: All dates are based on the local time zone where the tornado touched down; however, all times are in Coordinated Universal Time for consistency.)
| EF# | Location | County / Parish | State | Start Coord. | Time (UTC) | Path length | Max width |
|---|---|---|---|---|---|---|---|
| EFU | W of Elmwood | Beaver | OK | 36.6188°N 100.6606°W | 03:21–03:23 | 1.22 mi (1.96 km) | 50 yd (46 m) |
| EFU | A brief tornado touched down west of Elmwood with no damage observed. | | | | | | |
| EF0 | S of Beaver | Beaver | OK | 36.6843°N 100.524°W | 03:38–03:39 | 0.66 mi (1.06 km) | 50 yd (46 m) |
| EF0 | A brief tornado that struck powerlines but caused no visible damage to them was observed by a few storm chasers south of Beaver. | | | | | | |

=== December 13 event ===
List of confirmed tornadoes – Tuesday, December 13, 2022
| EF# | Location | County / Parish | State | Start Coord. | Time (UTC) | Path length | Max width |
|---|---|---|---|---|---|---|---|
| EFU | SW of Erick | Beckham | OK | 35.158°N 99.91°W | 06:13 | 0.2 mi (0.32 km) | 40 yd (37 m) |
| EFU | Storm chasers observed a brief QLCS tornado that resulted in no damage. | | | | | | |
| EF1 | Duncan | Stephens | OK | 34.523°N 97.973°W | 10:24–10:26 | 0.32 mi (0.51 km) | 50 yd (46 m) |
| EF1 | A large tree was uprooted and a power pole was snapped on the northeast side of Duncan | | | | | | |
| EF2 | NW of Cox City | Grady | OK | 34.741°N 97.746°W | 10:51–10:52 | 0.6 mi (0.97 km) | 50 yd (46 m) |
| EF2 | A home north of Cox City had its roof and second-story exterior walls removed. A barn was also destroyed. | | | | | | |
| EF0 | NW of Graford | Jack | TX | 33.04°N 98.31°W | 11:20–11:22 | 0.23 mi (0.37 km) | 30 yd (27 m) |
| EF0 | A brief tornado bent a flag pole, moved small sheds and snapped trees. | | | | | | |
| EF2 | Wayne | McClain, Cleveland | OK | 34.91°N 97.318°W | 11:27–11:33 | 4.9 mi (7.9 km) | 300 yd (270 m) |
| EF2 | This tornado touched down in the town of Wayne, causing damage to roofs, trees, and power lines. The tornado exited town and strengthened as it tracked to the north-northeast into a rural area, where a home was completely unroofed and had its exterior walls collapsed. A nearby outbuilding was destroyed as well. The tornado produced additional tree and power line damage as it tracked towards the Canadian River, dissipating just after crossing the river. | | | | | | |
| EF2 | N of Gorman to NNE of Desdemona | Eastland | TX | 32.2965°N 98.6678°W | 11:35–11:53 | 11.13 mi (17.91 km) | 355 yd (325 m) |
| EF2 | A high-end EF2 tornado touched down north of Gorman, producing damage to fences and trees. It continued northeast and moved through a large forested area, snapping or uprooting many trees, a few of which sustained some debarking. Farther along the path, a two-story house had a portion of its roof removed and sustained partial collapse of exterior walls, and was also damaged by a falling tree. A covered brick outdoor kitchen was destroyed, and farming equipment was lofted. The tornado then severely damaged a mobile home, collapsing all of its exterior walls. A large metal-framed equipment shed was also destroyed on the property. The tornado continued northeast, producing mainly tree damage before dissipating north-northeast of Desdemona. | | | | | | |
| EF0 | WSW of Wanette | Pottawatomie | OK | 34.938°N 97.116°W | 11:46–11:47 | 0.6 mi (0.97 km) | 30 yd (27 m) |
| EF0 | A weak tornado damaged trailers and trees. | | | | | | |
| EF1 | NE of Hennepin | Garvin | OK | 34.511°N 97.34°W | 11:55–12:00 | 4.2 mi (6.8 km) | 100 yd (91 m) |
| EF1 | Trees were damaged and the roof was removed from a communications building. | | | | | | |
| EF0 | NNE of Mineral Wells | Parker | TX | 32.8785°N 98.0565°W | 12:10–12:13 | 1.07 mi (1.72 km) | 50 yd (46 m) |
| EF0 | A brief, weak tornado damaged trees. | | | | | | |
| EF1 | ESE of Santo | Palo Pinto | TX | 32.5735°N 98.138°W | 12:31–12:44 | 3.7 mi (6.0 km) | 230 yd (210 m) |
| EF1 | Multiple outbuilding structures were significantly damaged by this high-end EF1 tornado, and a large metal outbuilding that housed a home gym was destroyed. Trees were downed and tree limbs were snapped, and a house had metal roofing peeled off. | | | | | | |
| EF2 | SE of Paradise to SE of Decatur | Wise | TX | 33.1195°N 97.6563°W | 12:59–13:13 | 9.71 mi (15.63 km) | 370 yd (340 m) |
| EF2 | This tornado touched down southeast of Paradise, producing minor tree damage and damaging the roof of a metal shop building. It continued to the northeast and reached mid-range EF2 intensity, snapping trees and tearing the roofs off of homes. Vehicles were also severely damaged and impaled by pieces of flying debris, while barns and storage buildings were damaged or destroyed. The tornado then crossed US 287, causing more tree damage before dissipating. Two people were injured. | | | | | | |
| EF0 | WSW of Weatherford | Parker | TX | 32.7259°N 97.8788°W | 13:00–13:10 | 0.71 mi (1.14 km) | 50 yd (46 m) |
| EF0 | A brief high-end EF0 tornado touched down west-southwest of Weatherford, producing damage to trees and a trailer. Multiple 18-wheelers were flipped over as the tornado crossed I-20, and a warehouse building had an exterior wall collapsed inward. Minor tree damage was observed in a subdivision shortly before the tornado dissipated. | | | | | | |
| EF1 | S of Bluff Dale | Erath | TX | 32.3331°N 98.0242°W | 13:34–13:37 | 0.66 mi (1.06 km) | 44 yd (40 m) |
| EF1 | Numerous trees were snapped or uprooted, and a home sustained significant roof loss. A detached garage was unroofed and had its garage door blown in. | | | | | | |
| EF0 | NW of Callisburg | Cooke | TX | 33.7232°N 97.0697°W | 13:44–13:46 | 0.44 mi (0.71 km) | 150 yd (140 m) |
| EF0 | A brief high-end EF0 tornado touched down northwest of Callisburg, where a home sustained minor roof damage, and a window at the residence was broken after being struck by a tree limb. Considerable tree damage occurred near the home and elsewhere along the path before the tornado dissipated. | | | | | | |
| EF0 | Westworth Village | Tarrant | TX | 32.7693°N 97.4337°W | 14:10–14:12 | 0.81 mi (1.30 km) | 25 yd (23 m) |
| EF0 | This brief tornado touched down at Naval Air Station Joint Reserve Base Fort Worth, where metal roofing was torn off a warehouse building and scattered across a taxiway. A fitness facility at the base was damaged as well. This was the first of six tornadoes produced by this storm in the Fort Worth area. | | | | | | |
| EF1 | Southwestern Sansom Park | Tarrant | TX | 32.7945°N 97.4096°W | 14:14–14:16 | 0.18 mi (0.29 km) | 40 yd (37 m) |
| EF1 | A brief tornado touched down at the southwestern edge of Sansom Park, snapping trees and tree branches and damaging some fences. This was the second of six tornadoes produced by this storm in the Fort Worth area. | | | | | | |
| EF0 | Northern Fort Worth | Tarrant | TX | 32.8294°N 97.3387°W | 14:18–14:20 | 0.34 mi (0.55 km) | 25 yd (23 m) |
| EF0 | A brief tornado touched down in an industrial area of Fort Worth to the south of Blue Mound, knocking over a few rail cars. Minor tree damage was observed in the area as well. This was the third of six tornadoes produced by this storm in the Fort Worth area. | | | | | | |
| EF1 | North Richland Hills | Tarrant | TX | 32.8863°N 97.2055°W | 14:34–14:40 | 1.85 mi (2.98 km) | 40 yd (37 m) |
| EF1 | A low-end EF1 tornado touched down in the northeastern part North Richland Hills, causing damage to trees and the roofs of homes in a residential area. Several businesses had their roofs damaged as it continued to the northeast. The tornado then moved through another residential neighborhood, where additional tree and roof shingle damage was observed, and dissipated shortly after. This was the fourth of six tornadoes produced by this storm in the Fort Worth area. | | | | | | |
| EF1 | Grapevine | Tarrant | TX | 32.9282°N 97.1016°W | 14:42–14:49 | 3.11 mi (5.01 km) | 150 yd (140 m) |
| EF1 | A high-end EF1 tornado touched down in Grapevine, where an office building suffered heavy roof damage, an automotive service building had an exterior wall blown out, a Discount Tire store sustained extensive damage to its roof decking and windows, and large sections of roof were torn off of a Sam's Club. An 18-wheeler was flipped over in the Sam's Club parking lot, and power poles were also damaged. The tornado was caught on video as it crossed SH 114 before it moved into a residential area, damaging trees and causing minor roof damage to homes. Elsewhere, a car wash was largely destroyed, a restaurant had roofing and awnings ripped off, HVAC units on the roof of Grapevine Middle School were damaged, and sheet metal was wrapped around power lines. A large warehouse that housed the Grapevine Service Center had multiple garage doors blown out and sustained severe roof damage, and a small truck was overturned nearby. Additional damage to trees, roofs, and garage doors occurred before the tornado dissipated. Five people were injured. This was the fifth of six tornadoes produced by this storm in the Fort Worth area. | | | | | | |
| EF1 | Northeastern Grapevine | Tarrant | TX | 32.965°N 97.044°W | 14:49–14:51 | 0.75 mi (1.21 km) | 100 yd (91 m) |
| EF1 | A brief tornado touched down in northeastern Grapevine, damaging the roof and walls of the Grapevine Mills Mall. Trees were damaged, along with the roofs of some apartment buildings. This was the last of six tornadoes produced by this storm in the Fort Worth area. | | | | | | |
| EF2 | W of Blue Ridge to WNW of Bailey | Collin, Fannin | TX | 33.2981°N 96.4287°W | 15:47–16:13 | 17.61 mi (28.34 km) | 225 yd (206 m) |
| EF2 | A strong tornado touched down west of Blue Ridge, causing damage to trees and destroying an outbuilding. Moving through the north edge of town, the tornado destroyed a mobile home, damaged a few other buildings and a cemetery, and impacted the athletic field at Blue Ridge High School, where fences and bleachers were damaged, dugouts were destroyed, and metal light poles were bent to the ground. The tornado continued to the northeast of Blue Ridge, where a house sustained destruction of its attached garage, other homes sustained significant roof damage, outbuildings were destroyed, and several mobile homes were heavily damaged or destroyed as well. As the tornado passed near Leonard, several homes sustained roof damage and two were completely unroofed, one of which sustained some collapse of exterior walls. A water treatment plant in this area was also damaged and an office trailer was completely destroyed, with its undercarriage being twisted. The tornado downed several trees before it lifted along SH 11 west-northwest of Bailey. Two people were injured. | | | | | | |
| EF1 | NW of Wolfe City | Hunt, Fannin | TX | 33.3566°N 96.1333°W | 16:12–16:22 | 6.6 mi (10.6 km) | 50 yd (46 m) |
| EF1 | A low-end EF1 tornado damaged trees and destroyed several sheds. The exterior wall of a mobile home was pushed in and impaled by a piece of wood, and a small trailer was thrown 100 yd (91 m). The tornado also moved through a solar farm, destroying numerous solar panels at that location. | | | | | | |
| EF2 | W of Petty to W of Hopewell | Lamar | TX | 33.6144°N 95.8268°W | 16:45–16:57 | 10.21 mi (16.43 km) | 200 yd (180 m) |
| EF2 | A low-end EF2 tornado significantly damaged a commercial building, which lost half of its roof. Siding panels were removed from the structure, and metal support beams were ripped from their anchors. The tornado also damaged two nearby metal buildings. Elsewhere, a metal-framed combination barn/residence was mostly destroyed with the beams being severely twisted, and some other homes were damaged to a lesser degree. Outbuildings and trees were damaged along the path as well. | | | | | | |
| EF2 | NW of De Berry to SSW of Waskom | Panola, Harrison | TX | 32.3323°N 94.2154°W | 21:38–21:52 | 9.15 mi (14.73 km) | 460 yd (420 m) |
| EF2 | A low-end EF2 wedge tornado touched down northwest of De Berry, snapping and uprooting approximately 200 large softwood trees. Continuing northeast, the roofs of a few homes were damaged, a metal outbuilding was damaged, and numerous additional trees were snapped. The tornado continued to snap and uproot trees and inflicted minor roof damage to a house as it crossed into Harrison County, passing near Elysian Fields. Additional trees were downed beyond this point, and a couple of outbuildings were damaged or destroyed. A two-story house had a substantial amount of roofing torn off shortly before the tornado dissipated. | | | | | | |
| EF2 | NW of Keachi | Caddo | LA | 32.221°N 94.0102°W | 22:36–22:41 | 3.46 mi (5.57 km) | 700 yd (640 m) |
| EF2 | 2 deaths – A high-end EF2 tornado touched down northwest of Keachi and impacted the small community of Four Forks, where multiple mobile homes were obliterated and debris was strewn throughout the area. One mobile home was lifted and tossed to the northeast, completely destroying the structure and killing the two occupants, including a woman whose body was thrown 200 yd (180 m). A few other residences were damaged to a lesser degree, and numerous large trees were snapped or uprooted. At least two people were injured. | | | | | | |
| EF3 | Northern Farmerville | Union | LA | 32.772°N 92.4683°W | 02:23–02:34 | 9.06 mi (14.58 km) | 500 yd (460 m) |
| EF3 | See section on this tornado – 14 people were injured. | | | | | | |
| EF1 | E of Winnsboro | Franklin, Madison | LA | 32.1807°N 91.5396°W | 04:19–04:35 | 11.12 mi (17.90 km) | 300 yd (270 m) |
| EF1 | A home was shifted off its block foundation, with a part of its roof ripped off and most of its windows shattered as well. An irrigation pivot was overturned, a few buildings at a camp site were damaged, other structures had their roofs peeled back, and some carports were blown away. Trees were snapped and uprooted, one of which fell on and crushed a car. | | | | | | |
| EF1 | Northwestern Forest Hill to S of Woodworth | Rapides | LA | 31.0599°N 92.5369°W | 04:26–04:29 | 2.74 mi (4.41 km) | 100 yd (91 m) |
| EF1 | A house and a plant nursery were damaged, and numerous trees were snapped or uprooted. | | | | | | |
| EF1 | SSE of Woodworth to S of Alexandria | Rapides | LA | 31.1208°N 92.4855°W | 04:31–04:37 | 7.3 mi (11.7 km) | 150 yd (140 m) |
| EF1 | Vehicles were flipped, and metal buildings sustained considerable damage at the Louisiana Department of Agriculture and Forestry as a result of this high-end EF1 tornado, which touched down after the previous one dissipated. A large office supply warehouse was heavily damaged near US 167, and trees were snapped. A house was damaged at a farm shortly before the tornado dissipated, while several metal grain silos and numerous outbuildings were damaged or destroyed on the property. A large truck was overturned at this location as well. | | | | | | |
| EF2 | Anguilla | Sharkey | MS | 32.97°N 90.84°W | 05:11–05:14 | 1.06 mi (1.71 km) | 250 yd (230 m) |
| EF2 | A brief but strong tornado impacted Anguilla and destroyed multiple outbuilding structures, including one that was well-constructed and had several hundred pound concrete anchors ripped out of the ground and thrown about 50 yards (46 m). Several manufactured homes were rolled and destroyed, and some frame homes and the community center in town sustained roof damage. A large metal warehouse building had exterior wall panels blown out, numerous trees were downed, and three people were injured. | | | | | | |
| EF2 | NW of Valley Park | Issaquena, Sharkey | MS | 32.60°N 91.00°W | 05:21–05:36 | 10.26 mi (16.51 km) | 400 yd (370 m) |
| EF2 | This strong tornado impacted the Kelso community. Numerous farm outbuildings were destroyed, a grain bin was tossed, and semi-trailers were rolled. Trees were snapped and uprooted as well. | | | | | | |
| EF1 | N of Belzoni | Humphreys | MS | 33.24°N 90.50°W | 05:56–06:00 | 3.15 mi (5.07 km) | 200 yd (180 m) |
| EF1 | Two small outbuildings were destroyed, one of which had its concrete footing pulled out of the ground and thrown, and a third outbuilding was damaged. An irrigation pivot was overturned, trees were uprooted, and tree branches were snapped. | | | | | | |

=== December 14 event ===
List of confirmed tornadoes – Wednesday, December 14, 2022
| EF# | Location | County / Parish | State | Start Coord. | Time (UTC) | Path length | Max width |
|---|---|---|---|---|---|---|---|
| EF0 | E of Tchula | Holmes | MS | 33.12°N 90.19°W | 07:04–07:09 | 5.91 mi (9.51 km) | 100 yd (91 m) |
| EF0 | A brief tornado caused tree and vegetation damage in the Hillside National Wildlife Refuge. | | | | | | |
| EF1 | E of Natchez | Adams | MS | 31.5°N 91.27°W | 08:54–09:04 | 4.61 mi (7.42 km) | 300 yd (270 m) |
| EF1 | A manufactured home, a travel trailer, and multiple sheds were damaged. Some trees were snapped or uprooted as well. | | | | | | |
| EF1 | SE of Fayette | Jefferson | MS | 31.61°N 91.04°W | 09:24–09:34 | 5.08 mi (8.18 km) | 300 yd (270 m) |
| EF1 | Several trees were snapped or uprooted, two homes sustained roof damage, and a shed was damaged as well. | | | | | | |
| EF0 | NW of Tallahala | Forrest | MS | 31.4°N 89.17°W | 10:44 | 0.2 mi (0.32 km) | 50 yd (46 m) |
| EF0 | The roof of a small shed was ripped off, while the roof of a hay barn was damaged. A trailer was tossed around 100 feet (30 m), and some trees were snapped. A separate, stronger tornado occurred a half mile west of this tornado a few hours later. | | | | | | |
| EF1 | NW of Good Hope | Jones | MS | 31.54°N 89.04°W | 11:09–11:18 | 4.08 mi (6.57 km) | 50 yd (46 m) |
| EF1 | Trees were snapped or uprooted along the path, and power lines were downed. | | | | | | |
| EF0 | Southwestern Terry | Hinds | MS | 32.08°N 90.32°W | 11:16–11:18 | 0.8 mi (1.3 km) | 70 yd (64 m) |
| EF0 | A brief tornado caused minor tree damage at the southwestern outskirts of Terry. | | | | | | |
| EF1 | NW of Georgetown | Copiah, Simpson | MS | 31.87°N 90.23°W | 11:48–11:57 | 6.43 mi (10.35 km) | 150 yd (140 m) |
| EF1 | Trees were uprooted along the path of this tornado. | | | | | | |
| EF1 | E of Canton | Rankin, Madison | MS | 32.55°N 89.89°W | 12:03–12:18 | 9.04 mi (14.55 km) | 1,000 yd (910 m) |
| EF1 | A large tornado snapped or uprooted numerous trees, some of which fell onto power lines. | | | | | | |
| EF0 | NW of Puckett | Rankin | MS | 32.10°N 89.90°W | 12:30–12:34 | 4.15 mi (6.68 km) | 500 yd (460 m) |
| EF0 | Several outbuildings were damaged, including a hay barn that was collapsed, and another structure that sustained damage to its metal roll-up door. Skirting on a manufactured home was blown off, and trees sustained minor damage. | | | | | | |
| EF2 | WNW of Polkville | Rankin | MS | 32.20°N 89.79°W | 12:44–12:50 | 3.23 mi (5.20 km) | 250 yd (230 m) |
| EF2 | A low-end EF2 tornado touched down west-northwest of Polkville, destroying four chicken houses. The debris from the chicken houses was strewn for several miles to the northeast. A few smaller trees were uprooted or damaged as the tornado crossed MS 43. The tornado continued northeast, producing minor tree damage and dissipating just before reaching the Smith County line. | | | | | | |
| EF1 | SE of Forest | Scott | MS | 32.28°N 89.46°W | 13:38–13:45 | 5.43 mi (8.74 km) | 500 yd (460 m) |
| EF1 | A few homes sustained considerable roof damage, some trees were snapped or uprooted, and many tree branches were snapped. | | | | | | |
| EF1 | NW of Lake | Scott | MS | 32.38°N 89.35°W | 13:58–14:00 | 0.85 mi (1.37 km) | 200 yd (180 m) |
| EF1 | Trees were snapped or uprooted, and a few barns were damaged. | | | | | | |
| EF1 | W of Mount Olive | Jefferson Davis, Simpson | MS | 31.74°N 89.82°W | 13:59–14:09 | 6.32 mi (10.17 km) | 250 yd (230 m) |
| EF1 | A few homes sustained roof damage, and some outbuildings were damaged as well. Numerous trees were damaged and uprooted along the path, and a carport was also damaged. | | | | | | |
| EFU | NE of Ville Platte | Evangeline | LA | 30.7663°N 92.2172°W | 15:25–15:26 | 0.01 mi (0.016 km) | 1 yd (0.91 m) |
| EFU | A storm spotter observed and photographed a tornado that touched down in a remote swampy area near Ville Platte. The area where the tornado occurred was not accessible to damage surveyors, and no intensity rating was assigned. | | | | | | |
| EF2 | Southeastern New Iberia | Iberia | LA | 29.9533°N 91.8382°W | 16:50–16:59 | 5.2 mi (8.4 km) | 300 yd (270 m) |
| EF2 | A high-end EF2 multiple-vortex tornado was broadcast live on KADN-TV as it impacted the southeastern part of New Iberia, causing significant damage. 20 to 25 mobile homes were damaged at a mobile home park, including four that were destroyed. Multiple homes and apartment buildings were significantly damaged, several of which sustained loss of roofs and exterior walls, while a few businesses were also severely damaged. The New Iberia Medical Center was heavily damaged, where roofing was torn off, numerous windows were blown out on multiple floors, and some damage to interior walls occurred. Other buildings at the medical complex were also damaged, along with several vehicles in the parking lots. The tornado would lift at Sam Snead Drive, doing low-end EF1 damage to one building. Along its path, numerous trees were snapped and sixteen people were injured. | | | | | | |
| EFU | SSW of New Iberia | Iberia | LA | 29.9523°N 91.8281°W | 16:52–16:53 | 0.2 mi (0.32 km) | 10 yd (9.1 m) |
| EFU | A satellite tornado to the previous tornado was confirmed using satellite imagery and video. The tornado touched down in an open field near the start of the main tornado's track and caused no damage. 3 to 4 other weak potential satellites visible on KADN-TV video formed in the same area, but were not rated by the NWS. | | | | | | |
| EF1 | SE of Catahoula | St. Martin | LA | 30.1120°N 91.6390°W | 17:16–17:17 | 0.09 mi (0.14 km) | 50 yd (46 m) |
| EF1 | A brief tornado overturned a mobile home and damaged some trees. | | | | | | |
| EF2 | SW of Garlandville to NW of Hickory to SW of Collinsville | Jasper, Newton, Lauderdale | MS | 32.19°N 89.21°W | 18:09–18:55 | 25.3 mi (40.7 km) | 600 yd (550 m) |
| EF2 | A strong, long-tracked tornado snapped or uprooted countless large trees as it moved through forested areas. A couple of sheds were heavily damaged or destroyed, a few homes sustained roof damage, and power lines were downed. | | | | | | |
| EF1 | SSW of Loranger to N of Osceola | Tangipahoa | LA | 30.58°N 90.37°W | 17:58–18:10 | 6.84 mi (11.01 km) | 50 yd (46 m) |
| EF1 | This tornado touched down and damaged sheds, snapped or uprooted hardwood trees, and tore down residential fencing as it moved northeast. The tornado reached its peak intensity, causing tree damage and defoliation in wooded and field areas. It continued northeast, with video and satellite imagery confirming damage before lifting near LA-445. | | | | | | |
| EF2 | NW of Tallahala | Forrest | MS | 31.40°N 89.18°W | 19:14–19:16 | 1.93 mi (3.11 km) | 100 yd (91 m) |
| EF2 | Numerous trees were snapped or uprooted, including one that fell on a manufactured home. The roof was ripped off of a small outbuilding. | | | | | | |
| EF1 | SE of Marion | Lauderdale | MS | 32.31°N 88.55°W | 19:57–20:11 | 8.14 mi (13.10 km) | 50 yd (46 m) |
| EF1 | The roofs were ripped off of an outbuilding and a hay barn, and another structure also sustained roof damage. Trees were snapped or uprooted as well. | | | | | | |
| EF2 | NE of Shubuta | Clarke | MS | 31.90°N 88.65°W | 20:19–20:47 | 19.07 mi (30.69 km) | 1,000 yd (910 m) |
| EF2 | A large high-end EF2 tornado impacted the Mannassa community. It destroyed a small wood-frame home and tore much of the roofing off of a second house. A manufactured home was completely destroyed, another manufactured home sustained roof and siding damage, and an outbuilding was also damaged. Countless large trees and many power poles were snapped along the path. | | | | | | |
| EF2 | Killona to NE of Montz | St. Charles | LA | 29.98°N 90.52°W | 20:20–20:33 | 9.85 mi (15.85 km) | 75 yd (69 m) |
| EF2 | 1 death – This tornado first touched down at the Nelson Coleman Correctional Center, where metal roofing was torn off. The roof of a nearby manufactured home was damaged as well, along with some power poles. The tornado reached its peak intensity as it struck Killona, where multiple frame homes had roofs and exterior walls torn off, a few were shifted off their foundations, and some mobile homes were completely destroyed, resulting in the death of a woman. One mobile home was tossed into a neighboring residence, a FEMA trailer and a car were flipped, while trees and power poles in town were snapped. After crossing the Mississippi River into Montz, the tornado completely unroofed a couple of homes, shifted a mobile home off its foundation, and snapped large tree branches. Several vehicles had their windows shattered at a steel fabricating business as well. Continuing past Montz, the tornado ripped the porch off a house, downed trees and tree limbs, and damaged or destroyed some outbuildings. High-resolution satellite coupled with radar imagery showed turned east-northeast causing tree damage and defoliation. The tornado then likely continued onto Lake Pontchartrain, where it then dissipated. Eight people were injured. | | | | | | |
| EF0 | E of Abita Springs to S of Talisheek | St. Tammany | LA | 30.45°N 89.97°W | 20:55–21:05 | 7.7 mi (12.4 km) | 50 yd (46 m) |
| EF0 | A weak tornado tracked through rural areas of St. Tammany Parish, primarily causing tree damage. This tornado was confirmed in November 2023, from a combination of damage reports, radar analysis, and high-resolution satellite data. | | | | | | |
| EF0 | Southern Houma | Terrebonne | LA | 29.5651°N 90.7226°W | 21:02–21:05 | 1.63 mi (2.62 km) | 50 yd (46 m) |
| EF0 | A high-end EF0 tornado rolled an RV trailer, downed some fences, removed all the roofing panels from an entrance shed, and peeled some of the siding and roof off of a large metal warehouse. The tornado also tore the front porch and some roofing panels from a home, and inflicted siding damage to other homes in a residential area before it dissipated. Tree branches were snapped along the path. | | | | | | |
| EF1 | NE of Ward | Sumter | AL | 32.3698°N 88.2732°W | 21:17–21:24 | 4.40 mi (7.08 km) | 225 yd (206 m) |
| EF1 | Two homes sustained minor roof damage, farm structures sustained roof and minor structural damage from flying debris, and trees were damaged. | | | | | | |
| EF1 | E of Lumberton | Forrest | MS | 30.98°N 89.33°W | 21:28–21:36 | 4.5 mi (7.2 km) | 50 yd (46 m) |
| EF1 | A pig shed was destroyed, the roof was ripped off a hay barn, and several trees were snapped or uprooted. | | | | | | |
| EF2 | Marrero to Arabi | Jefferson, Orleans, St. Bernard | LA | 29.8773°N 90.1239°W | 21:49–22:06 | 10.59 mi (17.04 km) | 200 yd (180 m) |
| EF2 | A strong tornado was broadcast live on WDSU as it caused significant damage in the New Orleans metro area. The tornado impacted the suburbs and neighborhoods of Marrero, Harvey, Gretna, Algiers, and Arabi, damaging some of the same areas that were struck by an EF3 tornado on March 22, 2022, especially on the south side of Arabi where the damage paths crossed. Numerous structures were damaged or destroyed along the tornado's path, including multiple homes that were unroofed, had exterior walls collapsed, or were shifted from their foundations. A brewery housed in a metal building in Arabi was rebuilt after being destroyed by the March EF3 tornado, only to be destroyed once again by this tornado. A small, unanchored house and a church were pushed off their foundations and destroyed, and some apartment buildings sustained extensive roof and fascia damage. Sets of anchored metal bleachers were ripped from their bolts at Archbishop Shaw Junior High School, while West Jefferson High School sustained roof and window damage. The front façade of a Winn Dixie grocery store was collapsed, trees and power poles were downed, and signs were destroyed. Several businesses and industrial buildings were also damaged, HVAC units were ripped off the roof of a hotel, and a semi-truck and an RV were flipped as well. Ten people were injured, with approximately $150 million in damage confirmed. | | | | | | |
| EF0 | NW of Silver Run | Pearl River, Stone | MS | 30.725°N 89.3626°W | 21:56–22:03 | 2.02 mi (3.25 km) | 75 yd (69 m) |
| EF0 | Multiple trees and two sheds were damaged. | | | | | | |
| EFU | NE of Shell Beach | St. Bernard | LA | 29.902°N 89.592°W | 22:43–22:52 | 3.95 mi (6.36 km) | 50 yd (46 m) |
| EFU | A post-event analysis revealed a defined, narrow damage path in the marsh of the Biloxi State Wildlife Management area. KLIX data showed a strong velocity couplet and a Tornado Debris Signature (TDS) between 5:44 and 5:52 PM CST. The exact path length and intensity are unknown due to the lack of damage indicators. | | | | | | |
| EFU | N of Happy Jack | Plaquemines | LA | 29.55°N 89.73°W | 23:01-23:12 | 7.14 mi (11.49 km) | 50 yd (46 m) |
| EFU | A post-event analysis revealed a defined, narrow damage path in the marsh near Felicity Bay. KLIX data showed a strong velocity couplet and a Tornado Debris Signature (TDS) between 6:01 and 6:06 PM CST. The exact path length and intensity are unknown due to the lack of damage indicators. | | | | | | |
| EF2 | W of Silver Cross to ENE of Bladon Springs | Washington, Choctaw | AL | 31.68°N 88.214°W | 23:40–23:48 | 3.36 mi (5.41 km) | 140 yd (130 m) |
| EF2 | A high-end EF2 tornado touched down west of Silver Cross and continued to the north of Frankville, snapping or uprooting countless large trees as it moved through areas of dense forest. Total deforestation occurred in the most severely affected area, with nearly all trees in the direct path being snapped at their bases. This tornado then continued northeast, crossing US 84 and downing several large tree branches before dissipating. In November 2023, this tornado was reanalyzed and received cosmetic updates based on Worldview satellite imagery. | | | | | | |
| EF2 | E of Bladon Springs | Choctaw | AL | 31.7296°N 88.1707°W | 23:49–23:52 | 1.79 mi (2.88 km) | 120 yd (110 m) |
| EF2 | Shortly after the previous tornado dissipated, this tornado touched down in a wooded area and almost immediately intensified to EF2 strength, snapping or uprooting numerous large trees. In November 2023, this tornado was reanalyzed and had its starting point further southeast based on Planet and Worldview satellite imagery. | | | | | | |
| EF1 | Western Biloxi | Harrison | MS | 30.3908°N 88.9702°W | 23:52–23:55 | 2.31 mi (3.72 km) | 100 yd (91 m) |
| EF1 | A tornadic waterspout moved onshore in the western part of Biloxi, snapping or uprooting many trees, many of which fell on power lines. One tree landed on and damaged the roof of a pavilion, and the roof of a metal shed was ripped off. Unsecured bleachers were tossed 50 yards (46 m), a few shingles were torn from military housing, and grave markers were damaged at the Biloxi National Cemetery. The most severe damage occurred to the VA Gulf Coast Health Care System campus, where two windows were shattered, the roof of a small building was peeled off, and an outbuilding structure collapsed. | | | | | | |
| EF0 | Apalachicola National Forest | Liberty | FL | 30.07°N 84.92°W | 00:54-01:05 | 3.57 mi (5.75 km) | 25 yd (23 m) |
| EF0 | A tornadic debris signature was observed on radar and tree damage was confirmed. | | | | | | |
| EF0 | NNW of Carrabelle | Franklin | FL | 29.9233°N 84.7343°W | 01:54–01:56 | 0.33 mi (0.53 km) | 210 yd (190 m) |
| EF0 | Multiple pine trees were snapped or uprooted by this brief and weak tornado. | | | | | | |
| EF0 | SE of DeFuniak Springs | Walton | FL | 30.678°N 86.029°W | 01:55-02:00 | 1.61 mi (2.59 km) | 25 yd (23 m) |
| EF0 | Several trees were blown down. | | | | | | |
| EF1 | NW of Sopchoppy | Wakulla | FL | 30.053°N 84.548°W | 02:29–02:42 | 5.69 mi (9.16 km) | 75 yd (69 m) |
| EF1 | A home sustained roof damage, and several pine trees were snapped. | | | | | | |
| EF0 | S of Tallahassee | Wakulla | FL | 30.274°N 84.348°W | 03:14-03:18 | 1.5 mi (2.4 km) | 25 yd (23 m) |
| EF0 | Trees were blown down. | | | | | | |

=== December 15 event ===
List of confirmed tornadoes – Thursday, December 15, 2022
| EF# | Location | County / Parish | State | Start Coord. | Time (UTC) | Path length | Max width |
|---|---|---|---|---|---|---|---|
| EF2 | SW of Doerun to Ticknor | Colquitt | GA | 31.3039°N 83.9463°W | 10:27–10:32 | 1.96 mi (3.15 km) | 280 yd (260 m) |
| EF2 | This strong tornado touched down southwest of Doerun, causing damage to trees and a mobile home. Continuing northeast, it snapped and uprooted numerous large trees and caused minor roof damage to a home. The tornado then crossed SR 270, causing significant damage to a cotton gin facility. More trees were either snapped or uprooted before the tornado dissipated shortly after. | | | | | | |
| EF1 | Southern Masaryktown to SW of Ridge Manor | Pasco, Hernando | FL | 28.4310°N 82.4729°W | 15:48–16:03 | 10.3 mi (16.6 km) | 100 yd (91 m) |
| EF1 | A low-end EF1 tornado touched down in the southern part of Masaryktown, causing minor damage to a home and snapping trees. Additional tree damage occurred farther along the path before the tornado dissipated. | | | | | | |
| EF1 | NE of South Pasadena | Pinellas | FL | 27.7744°N 82.7345°W | 17:01–17:05 | 1.88 mi (3.03 km) | 100 yd (91 m) |
| EF1 | A short-lived EF1 tornado touched down south of Kenneth City damaging the roofs of a few homes, a daycare center, and a church. Two people were injured. | | | | | | |
| EF0 | North Port | Sarasota | FL | 27.07°N 82.22°W | 20:15–20:17 | 0.14 mi (0.23 km) | 100 yd (91 m) |
| EF0 | A brief high-end EF0 tornado uprooted trees and caused pool cage damage to homes in North Port. | | | | | | |

=== Farmerville, Louisiana ===
Farmerville, Louisiana
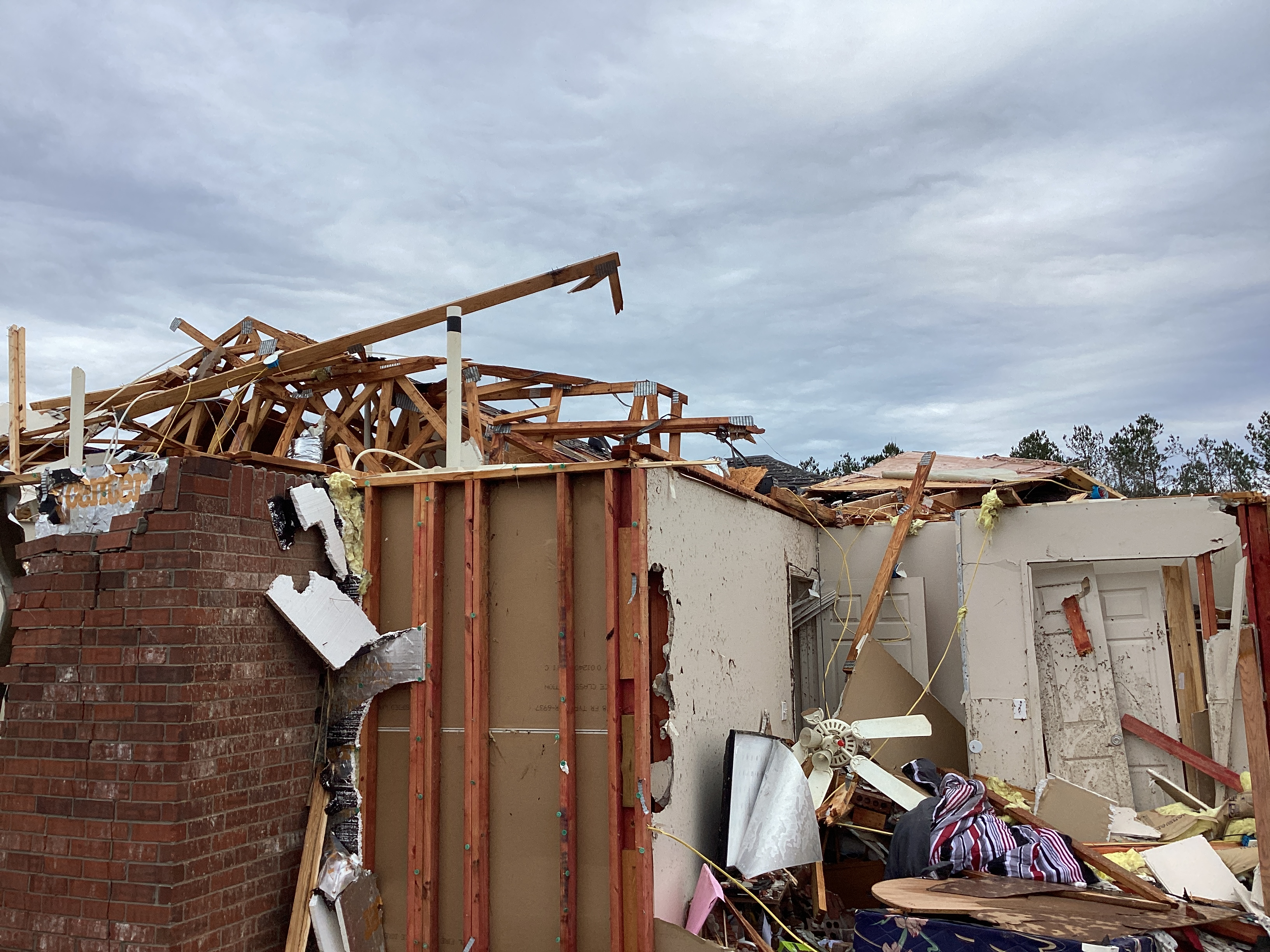
- Low-end EF3 damage to a one-story apartment building at the Union Village Apartments.

Meteorological history
- Formed: December 13, 2022, 8:23 p.m. CST (UTC−06:00)
- Dissipated: December 13, 2022, 8:34 p.m. CST (UTC−06:00)
- Duration: 11 minutes

EF3 tornado
- on the Enhanced Fujita scale
- Highest winds: 140 mph (230 km/h)

Overall effects
- Fatalities: 0
- Injuries: 14
- Damage: $1.2 million (2022 USD)

This intense low-end EF3 tornado touched down west of Farmerville, initially snapping or uprooting numerous trees at EF1 strength, some of which ended up falling on multiple homes. Moving northeast, the tornado then began to intensify as it crossed LA 2 and Lake D'Arbonne. A two-story home sustained high-end EF2 damage at this location, sustaining loss of its roof and destruction of most of its second story. Two injuries occurred inside the two-story home. EF1 damage occurred nearby, as some outbuildings and shop buildings were destroyed as well. The tornado then tracked back across Lake D'Arbonne before coming ashore at Corney Creek Drive and Dozier Road. Several residences were damaged by falling trees in this area, a cabin was destroyed by a combination of falling trees and wind from the tornado, and damage in this area was rated EF1 to EF2. The tornado then moved through a forested area and caused 2 mi (3.2 km) of tree damage that was unable to be surveyed by the National Weather Service damage survey team. While in this unsurveyable stretch, the tornado grew to its peak width of 500 yards (460 m). Continuing at EF2 intensity, the tornado crossed Denton Road where multiple outbuildings and mobile homes were demolished, including one double-wide mobile home that was thrown and completely destroyed, with five injuries reported. Two frame homes had their roofs torn off, and also sustained some damage to their exterior walls. Additionally, power poles were snapped and major tree damage occurred, with some debarking observed. The tornado continued causing significant tree damage as it continued northeast towards the Union Village Apartments, located along the northern outskirts of Farmerville. (Note: The Union Village Apartments are an enclave of the town of Farmerville.)

As the tornado entered the apartment complex, it reached its peak intensity and maintained a width of 400 to 500 yards (370 to 460 m). Dozens of one-story brick apartment buildings were severely damaged and had large portions of their roofs torn off, and vehicles were flipped as well. One apartment building sustained total roof loss and collapse of multiple exterior walls, earning a rating of EF3 with winds estimated at 140 miles per hour (230 km/h). Despite the intense damage, it was believed the strongest core of the tornadic winds only clipped the south end of the apartment complex, where the EF3 damage occurred. Louisiana Governor John Bel Edwards later said out of the 74 units at this apartment complex, only 12 of them were habitable following the tornado. Adjacent to the Union Village Apartments, 7 out of the 9 mobile homes at a mobile home park were thrown and destroyed. After exiting the apartment complex and mobile home park, the tornado then entered another heavily forested area, most of which the not accessible to the National Weather Service damage survey team. However, numerous trees were snapped along this segment of the path, and an EF2 rating was applied at this location. After exiting the forested area, the tornado then significantly weakened, with only EF1 and EF0 tree and structural damage being observed for the remaining mile of the tornado's track. After that, the tornado dissipated. In total, at least fourteen people were injured by the tornado.

== Non-tornadic effects ==
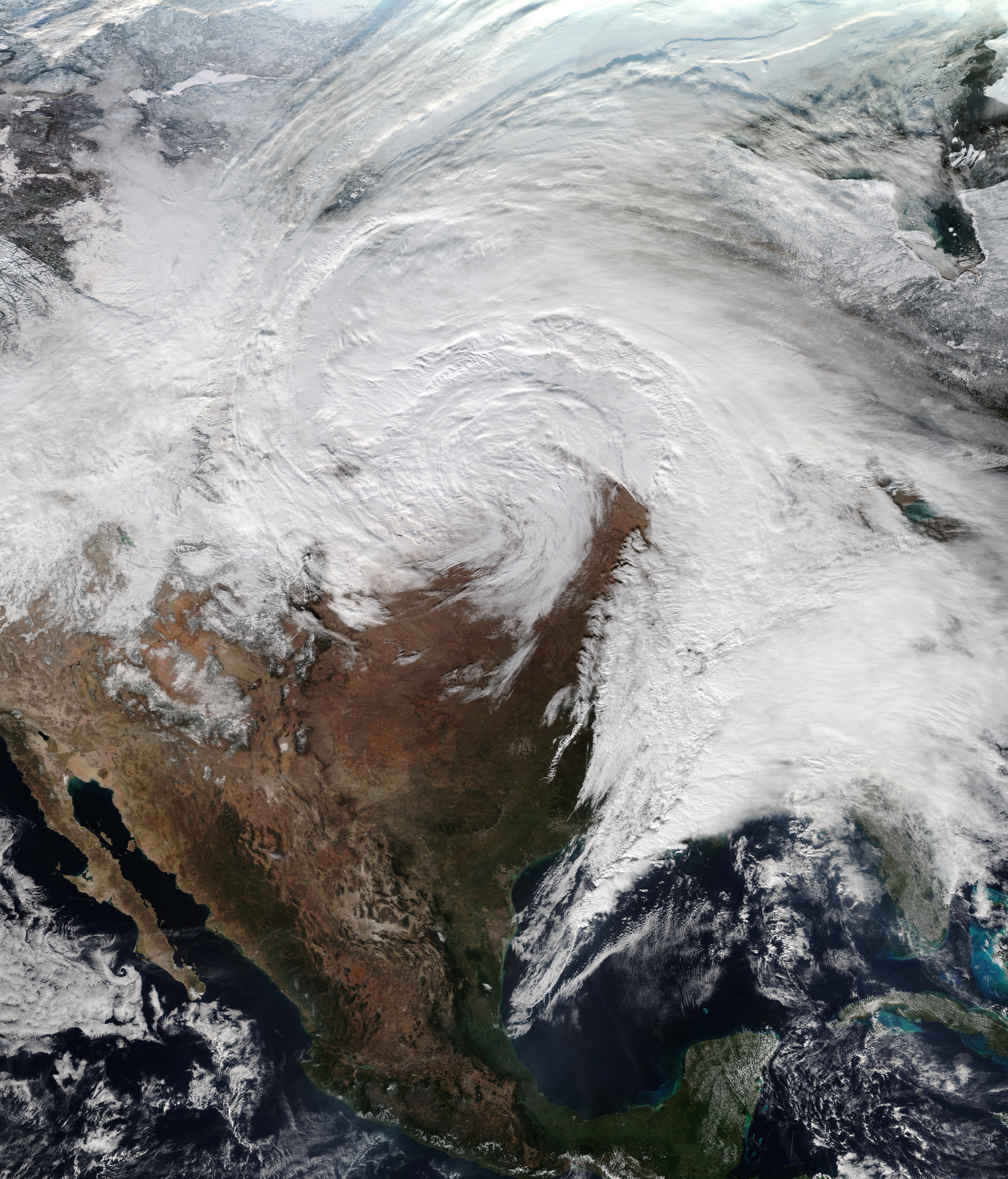
A satellite view of the extratropical cyclone that was responsible for the tornado outbreak in the south and blizzard in the north on December 14.

A major blizzard occurred in the Great Plains related to the tornado outbreak, leading to heavy snow and freezing rain. In Fargo, North Dakota, all after-school activities on December 13 were canceled. Parts of I-80 and I-76 in Nebraska were shut down due to the blizzard, as was part of I-90 in South Dakota. In Colorado, portions of I-70 and US 6 also shut down briefly. Portions of I-29 were also shut down as the storm approached. On SD 37 in Parkston, a car crash occurred due to the icy roads, killing 3 people. The Black Hills National Forest was forced to implement seasonal closures three days early due to the storm. All schools in Campbell County, Wyoming closed on December 14, as much of Wyoming’s interstate system closed. Freezing rain accumulation peaked at 0.40 in (10 mm) in Litchville, North Dakota. Further east, blizzard conditions and thundersnow were verified in Duluth, Minnesota. Power outages totaled 45,000 in Minnesota, 70,000 in Wisconsin, and 43,700 in Michigan. After the storm swept across Illinois, the city of Rockford spent 306 consecutive hours below freezing.

Further east in Pennsylvania, at Penn State University, the snowstorm forced the final exams to be rescheduled from December 15 to December 16 and 17. Small portions of I-80 closed due to the storm, and the Skyline Drive in Virginia was also closed. A ground stop was issued at Toronto Pearson International Airport. By the morning of December 16, snow accumulations reached 11.4 in (29 cm) in Wilmington, Vermont, and 31 in (79 cm) in Pinkham Notch, New Hampshire. New Hampshire reported 47 car crashes in just two hours during the storm. Ultimately, around 50,000 customers in the Northeast lost power.

== Impact ==
Amtrak's southbound Heartland Flyer was forced to go at a restricted speed on the morning of December 13 due to severe weather damage along its route, which included the tornadic damage in Wayne, Oklahoma. Tornadoes on December 14 delayed the westbound Sunset Limited as well as the northbound and southbound Crescent.

Governor John Bel Edwards declared a state of emergency throughout Louisiana on December 13. On December 14, school districts in multiple counties and parishes closed or implemented delayed starts. St. Charles Parish President Matthew Jewell also declared a state of emergency, separate from the statewide declaration, for the Louisiana parish after a tornado killed one and injured several.

On December 15, following the issuance of a tornado watch for parts of Florida, Universal Orlando Resort closed for the day. The tornado watch also resulted in a ground stop at Orlando International Airport. Disney's Blizzard Beach shut down on December 16 and 17 due to colder temperatures after the system passed through.

== See also ==
- List of North American tornadoes and tornado outbreaks
- Weather of 2022
