= Elysian Fields High School =

Location
- 2400 F M 451; Elysian Fields, Texas 75642-0120; United States; 32.379482°N 94.144650°W

Information
- School type: Public high school
- School district: Elysian Fields Independent School District
- Principal: Chaye Massey
- Grades: 9-12
- Enrollment: 241 (2023-2024)
- Colors: Orange, white, and black
- Athletics conference: UIL Class 3A
- Mascot: Yellow Jackets
- Website: Elysian Fields High School website

Elysian Fields High School is a public high school located in Elysian Fields, Texas (USA). It is part of the Elysian Fields Independent School District located in southeastern Harrison County. Students also attend from the community of DeBerry and portions of northeastern Panola County In 2011, the school was rated "Academically Acceptable" by the Texas Education Agency.

Elysian Fields High was known in the 1980s for its strong athletic, forestry, and One-Act Play programs.

== Athletics ==
The Elysian Fields Yellowjackets compete in the following sports:

- Baseball
- Basketball
- Cross country
- Football
- Golf
- Powerlifting
- Softball
- Tennis
- Track and field
- Volleyball
- Swimming

=== State titles ===
- Softball
  - 2005(2A)

==== State finalist ====
- Baseball
  - 2001(2A),
- Football
  - 1998(2A/D2), 1999(2A/D2), 2007(2A/D2),
- Softball
  - 2006(2A)

State Semi-Finals: Football - 2012(2A)
