= Happy Jack =

Happy Jack may refer to:

- "Happy Jack" (song), a song by English rock band The Who; released as a single in 1966
- Happy Jack (album), 1967 US release of A Quick One, the 1966 studio album by The Who
- "Happy Jack" Angokwazhuk (c. 1870 - 1918), an Eskimo carver
- Jack M. "Happy Jack" Ilfrey, United States Army Air Forces pilot during World War II
- John "Happy Jack" Scaddan (1876–1934), former premier of Western Australia
- John "Happy Jack" Wilton (1910–1981), Australian general
- Happy Jack, 1918 children's novel by Thornton Burgess
- Happy Jack, a play by John Godber, published in 1989, about a couple who live in a mining village in West Yorkshire

== Places ==
- Happy Jack, Arizona, an unincorporated town in Southwestern United States
- Happy Jack Chalk Mine (Greeley County, Nebraska), an underground limestone quarry Central United States, south of Scotia, Nebraska
- Happy Jack Peak, a hill in Greeley County, Nebraska, United States
- Happy Jack, Louisiana, an unincorporated community in Southern United States
- Happy Jack Mine, a uranium mine near Monticello, Utah, United States
- Happy Jack Road, Wyoming Highway 210 in Western United States
- Happy Jack Summit, a mountain pass in the Southern Rocky Mountains, in Wyoming, United States.

== See also ==
- Smilin' Jack (disambiguation)
