= Smilin' Jack =

Smilin' Jack or Smiling Jack may refer to:

- The Adventures of Smilin' Jack, an American newspaper cartoon strip that ran from 1933 to 1973
  - The Adventures of Smilin' Jack (serial), a film serial based on the cartoon strip
- Smilin' Jack Smith (1913–2006), an American singer, radio host, and actor
- John M. Conroy (1920–1979), an American actor, aviator, and businessman, nicknamed "Smiling Jack"
- John Tait (runner) (1888–1971), a Canadian athlete
- John F. Wiley (1920–2013), an American football player and coach, nicknamed "Smiling Jack"

== See also ==
- Happy Jack (disambiguation)
