= Elysian Fields Independent School District =

School district in Texas

Elysian Fields Independent School District is a public school district based in the community of Elysian Fields, Texas (USA).

In addition to Elysian Fields, the district also serves the community of DeBerry as well as rural areas in southeastern Harrison County and northeastern Panola County.

In 2009, the school district was rated "academically acceptable" by the Texas Education Agency.

== Schools ==
- Elysian Fields High School (students Grades 9–12)
- Elysian Fields Middle School (students Grades 6–8)
- Elysian Fields Elementary School (students Grades PK-5)
