= Boylston, Alabama =

- Neighborhood
- Location within Alabama Location within the United States
- Coordinates: 32°25′42″N 86°16′46″W
- Country: United States
- State: Alabama
- County: Montgomery
- Elevation: 217 ft (66 m)
- Time zone: UTC-6 (Central (CST))
  - Summer (DST): UTC-5 (CDT)
- Area code: 334
- GNIS feature ID: 114799

Boylston is a former unincorporated community in Montgomery County, Alabama, United States, that is now a neighborhood within the city of Montgomery, between the city's downtown and the Tallapoosa River.

== History ==
The community was likely named after a local family. A post office opened under the name Boylston in 1827.
