= Good Hope, Perry County, Mississippi =

Good Hope, Mississippi
- Unincorporated community
- Location within Mississippi Location within the United States
- Coordinates: 31°24′16″N 88°56′56″W
- Country: United States
- State: Mississippi
- County: Perry
- Elevation: 266 ft (81 m)
- Time zone: UTC-6 (Central (CST))
  - Summer (DST): UTC-5 (CDT)
- Area codes: 601 & 769
- GNIS feature ID: 693314

Good Hope is an unincorporated community in Perry County, Mississippi, United States. Good Hope is located on Mississippi Highway 15 3.8 miles (6.1 km) north of Richton.
