= Osceola, Louisiana =

Unincorporated community in Louisiana

- Unincorporated community
- Location within Louisiana Location within the United States
- Coordinates: 30°39′03″N 90°18′41″W
- Country: United States
- State: Louisiana
- Parish: Tangipahoa
- Elevation: 102 ft (31 m)
- Time zone: UTC-6 (Central (CST))
  - Summer (DST): UTC-5 (CDT)
- Area code: 985
- GNIS feature ID: 555570
- FIPS code: 22-58325

Osceola is an unincorporated community in Tangipahoa Parish, Louisiana, United States. The community is located 16 miles (25.75 kilometres) NW of Covington, Louisiana.

Ella B. Hughes wrote that in 1888 a post office was built in Husser, Louisiana and just a few years later a second post office was built a few miles to the south and was called Viola. The area was renamed Osceola just a few years later.

== Etymology ==
The name of the community is derived from an ancient native american ritual dating back to the Archaic period. The Muscogee people would perform a ritual they called ássi which means black drink and yahola which means "shouting man" or "singer". There was also a very influential leader of the Seminole people from Florida named Osceola that was given this name.
