= Cox City, Oklahoma =

- Unincorporated community
- Location within Oklahoma Location within the United States
- Coordinates: 34°43′31″N 97°43′54″W
- Country: United States
- State: Oklahoma
- County: Grady
- Elevation: 1,207 ft (368 m)
- Time zone: UTC-6 (Central (CST))
  - Summer (DST): UTC-5 (CDT)
- GNIS feature ID: 1091793

Cox City is an unincorporated community in Grady County, Oklahoma, United States. A post office operated in Cox City from 1927 to 1964. The town was named after an oil man, Edwin B. Cox, from Ardmore.
