= DeBerry, Texas =

Unincorporated community in Texas, US

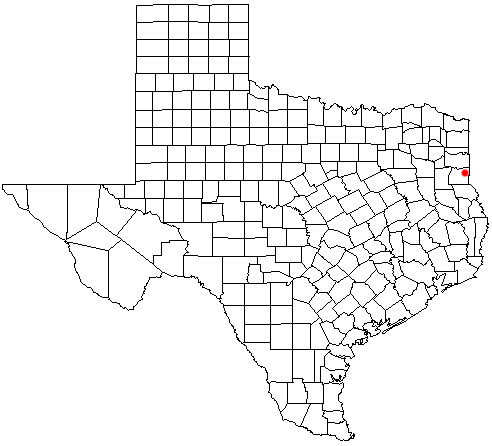
Location of DeBerry in the state of Texas

DeBerry (or De Berry) is an unincorporated community in Panola County, Texas, United States. The community has an estimated population of 3,305.

== Geography ==
DeBerry is located at 32°18′12″N 94°10′00″W (32.3032138, -94.1665797). It is situated at the junction of U.S. Highway 79 and Farm Roads 31 and 1794 in northeastern Panola County, fourteen miles northeast of Carthage.

== History ==
Known as Evergreen prior to the Civil War, the community's name was changed to DeBerry, for local citizen and legislator Alfred Wesley De Berry. A post office was established in 1874 and by 1885, 150 people lived in the community. The population doubled to 300 in the early 1890s before declining in the 1910s. The discovery of oil in the area during the 1920s led to another population boom. By 1929, approximately 250 residents lived in DeBerry. Seven years later, that figure had dipped to 233. Throughout the latter half of the twentieth century, the population remained stable at approximately 200. The community had thirty rated businesses in 2000. Despite its unincorporated status, DeBerry's post office (zip code: 75639) remains operational.

== Education ==
Public education in the community of DeBerry is provided by the Elysian Fields Independent School District, which is based in the nearby community of Elysian Fields. The district serves southeastern Harrison County and northeastern Panola County.

== Climate ==
The climate in this area is characterized by hot, humid summers and generally mild to cool winters. According to the Köppen Climate Classification system, DeBerry has a humid subtropical climate, abbreviated "Cfa" on climate maps.
