= Hennepin, Oklahoma =

Unincorporated community in Oklahoma, US

- Unincorporated community and Census-designated place
- Location within Oklahoma Location within the United States
- Coordinates: 34°30′52″N 97°20′57″W
- Country: United States
- State: Oklahoma
- County: Garvin

Area
  - Total: 1.60 sq mi (4.14 km^{2})
  - Land: 1.59 sq mi (4.13 km^{2})
  - Water: 0.0039 sq mi (0.01 km^{2})
- Elevation: 929 ft (283 m)

Population (2020)
  - Total: 143
  - Density: 89.6/sq mi (34.61/km^{2})
- Time zone: UTC-6 (Central (CST))
  - Summer (DST): UTC-5 (CDT)
- ZIP code: 73444
- FIPS code: 40-33650
- GNIS feature ID: 2805321

Hennepin is an unincorporated community along State Highway 7 in extreme southern Garvin County, Oklahoma, United States, near the point where Carter, Garvin and Murray counties intersect. As of the 2020 census, Hennepin had a population of 143. Hennepin County was named for Father Louis Hennepin, a member of Lasalle's Louisiana Expedition.

== Demographics ==
Historical population
Census	Pop.	Note	%±
2020	143		—
U.S. Decennial Census

=== 2020 census ===
As of the 2020 census, Hennepin had a population of 143. The median age was 45.5 years. 25.9% of residents were under the age of 18 and 24.5% of residents were 65 years of age or older. For every 100 females there were 93.2 males, and for every 100 females age 18 and over there were 89.3 males age 18 and over.

0.0% of residents lived in urban areas, while 100.0% lived in rural areas.

There were 48 households in Hennepin, of which 22.9% had children under the age of 18 living in them. Of all households, 45.8% were married-couple households, 6.3% were households with a male householder and no spouse or partner present, and 39.6% were households with a female householder and no spouse or partner present. About 25.0% of all households were made up of individuals and 20.9% had someone living alone who was 65 years of age or older.

There were 57 housing units, of which 15.8% were vacant. The homeowner vacancy rate was 2.1% and the rental vacancy rate was 0.0%.

Racial composition as of the 2020 census
Race	Number	Percent
White	108	75.5%
Black or African American	3	2.1%
American Indian and Alaska Native	2	1.4%
Asian	0	0.0%
Native Hawaiian and Other Pacific Islander	0	0.0%
Some other race	4	2.8%
Two or more races	26	18.2%
Hispanic or Latino (of any race)	21	14.7%
