= Tallahala, Mississippi =

- Unincorporated community
- Location within Mississippi Location within the United States
- Coordinates: 31°23′12″N 89°07′23″W
- Country: United States
- State: Mississippi
- County: Perry
- Elevation: 174 ft (53 m)
- Time zone: UTC-6 (Central (CST))
  - Summer (DST): UTC-5 (CDT)
- ZIP code: 39476
- Area code: 601
- GNIS feature ID: 694931

Tallahala, also known as Macedonia, is an unincorporated community in Perry County, in the U.S. state of Mississippi.

== History ==
The community takes its name from Tallahala Creek.
