= Ward, Alabama =

Unincorporated community in Alabama, United States

- Unincorporated community
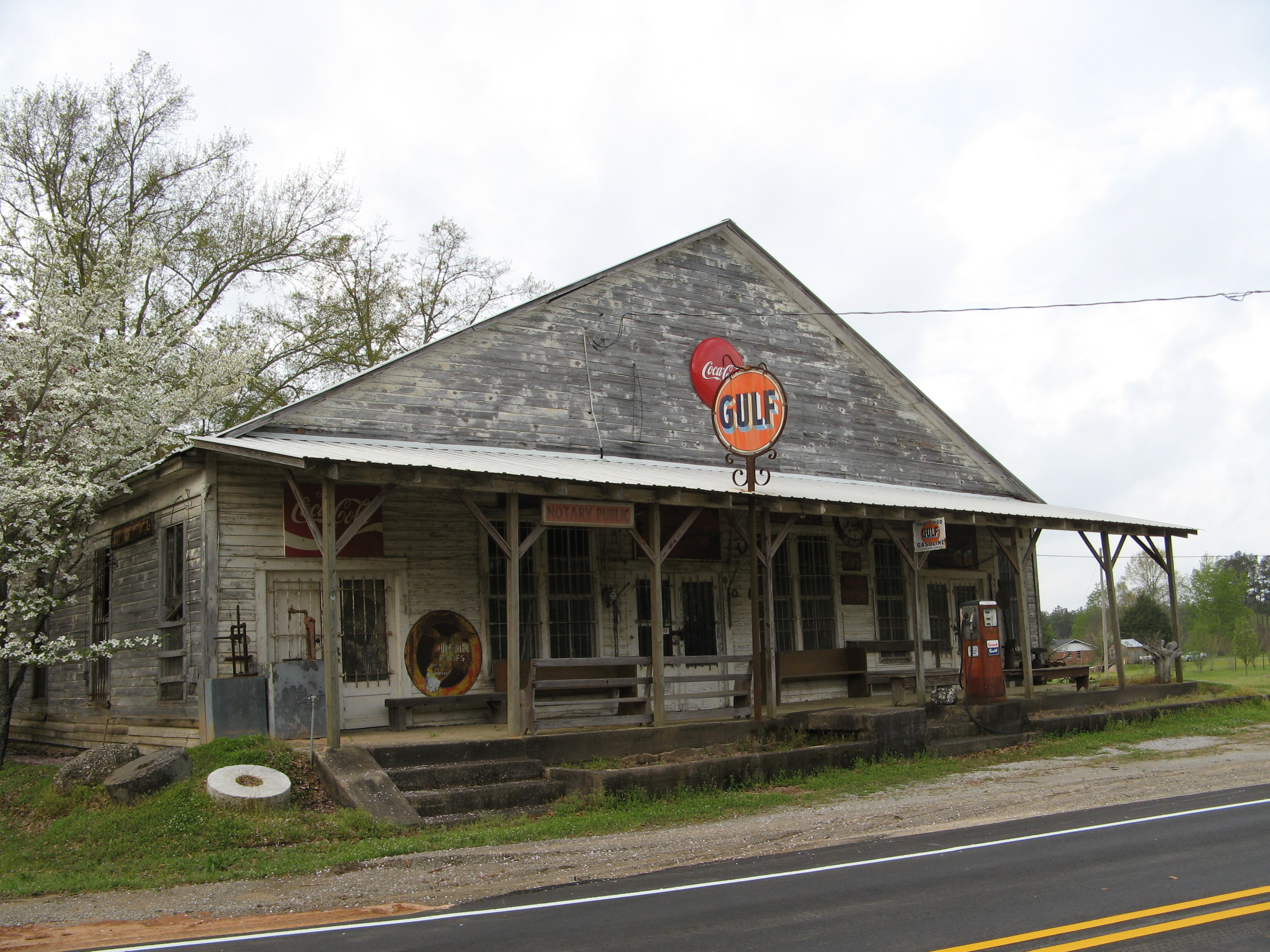
- Store in Ward, 2008

- Location within Alabama Location within the United States
- Coordinates: 32°21′44″N 88°16′41″W
- Country: United States
- State: Alabama
- County: Sumter
- Elevation: 203 ft (62 m)
- Time zone: UTC-6 (Central (CST))
  - Summer (DST): UTC-5 (CDT)
- ZIP code: 36922
- Area codes: 205, 659
- GNIS feature ID: 153882

Ward is an unincorporated community in Sumter County, Alabama, United States. Its ZIP code is 36922.
