= Happy Jack, Louisiana =

Unincorporated community in Louisiana, U.S.

Coordinates: 29°31′19″N 89°44′01″W

Happy Jack is an unincorporated community in Plaquemines Parish, Louisiana, United States.

== History ==
A post office called Happy Jack was established in 1874, and remained in operation until 1958. The community has the nickname of an early settler who was noted for his cheerful nature. Variant names were "Point Michael" and "Ronquillo Settlement".
