= Elysian Fields, Texas =

Unincorporated community in Texas, US

Coordinates: 32°22′07″N 94°10′59″W

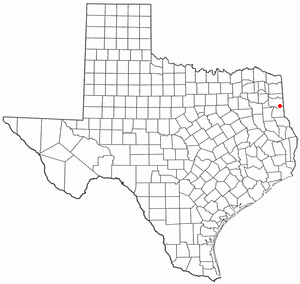
Elysian Fields

Elysian Fields is a rural unincorporated community in Harrison County, Texas, United States. It lies 11 miles southeast of the county seat of Marshall.

The community was originally the site of a Caddo village named Big Springs. The name of the town is believed to have originated from a dinner conversation in New Orleans in which Capt. Edward Smith compared its beauty to the Elysian Fields of Greek Mythology in 1817. Smith and his family settled in the area in the 1830s. In 1910 the community relocated one mile to the west, so it could be linked to a railroad. The community is now the center of the Elysian Fields Independent School District.

The school district has an estimated population of 3,917.
