= Land Trust for the Mississippi Coastal Plain =

American non-profit conservation organization

- Formation: 2000
- Purpose: Conservation
- Headquarters: 955-A Howard Avenue, Biloxi, Mississippi
- Region served: Six Coastal Plain counties of south Mississippi
- Executive Director: Sara Guice
- Website: Land Trust for the Mississippi Coastal Plain

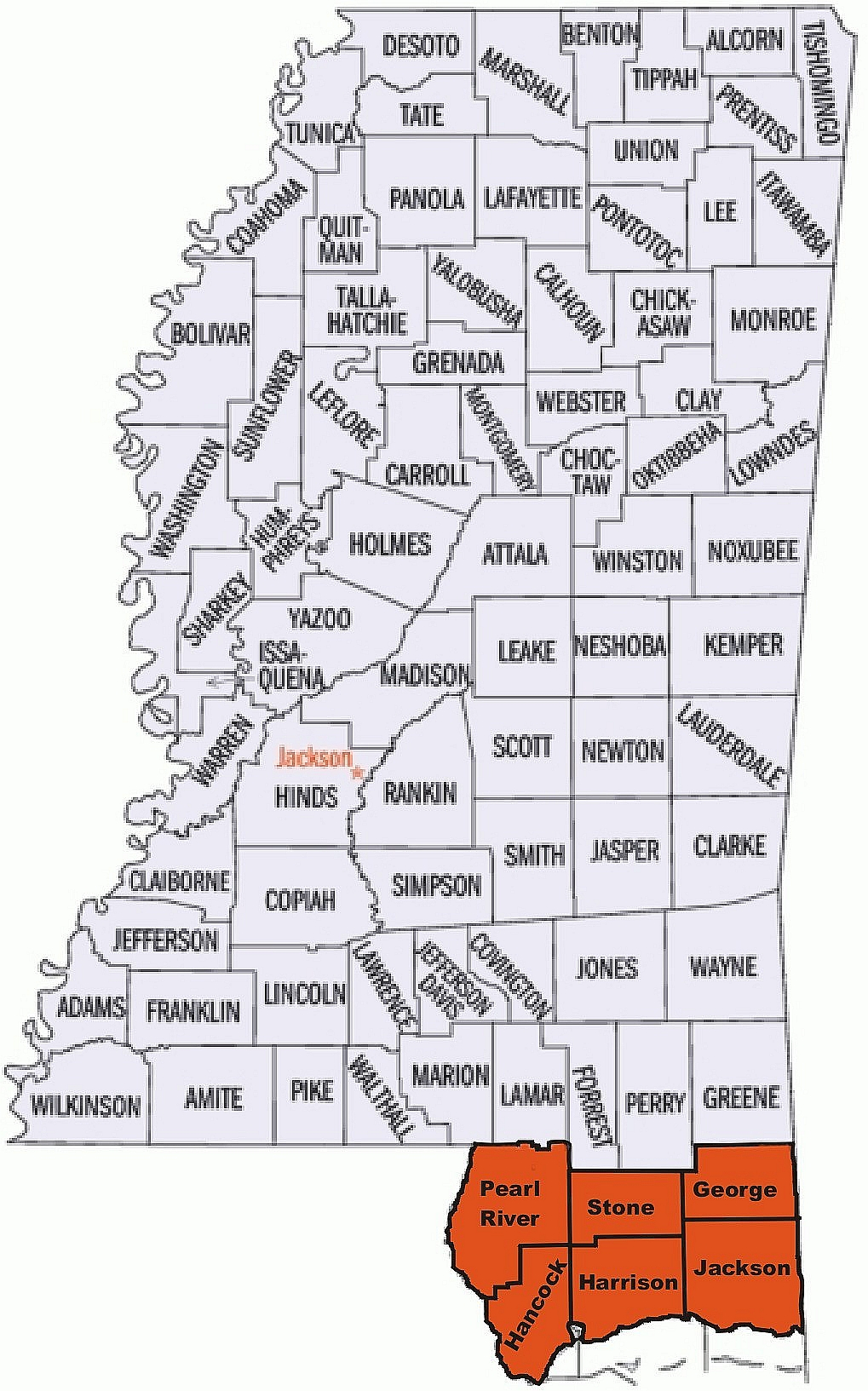
Mississippi Coastal Plain Counties

The mission of the Land Trust for the Mississippi Coastal Plain is:

to conserve, promote and protect open spaces and green places of ecological, cultural or scenic significance in the counties of the Mississippi Coastal Plain.

== History ==
Founded in 2000, the non-profit Land Trust for the Mississippi Coastal Plain (LTMCP) operates in the six Coastal Plain counties of south Mississippi and is accredited by the Land Trust Accreditation Commission of the Land Trust Alliance. The LTMCP works with private landowners and local authorities to conserve wetlands, as well as other lands in the region, that are environmentally or culturally significant. The agency has more than 10,000 acres (4047 hectares) in conservation management. Many of the properties offer public access for hiking and bird watching.

=== Donation ===
In 2010, the LTMCP acquired 57 acres (23 hectares) at the site of the former Ramsey Springs Hotel in Stone County, Mississippi, and conveyed it to the State of Mississippi with an understanding that the property would be dedicated to conservation and managed for public-use because of its ecological, cultural, and scenic significance.

== Conservation properties by county ==
As of 2020, LTMCP had 54 conservation properties under its protection.

George County

- Lucedale Depot Creek, Summerour Property, Sistrunk Property

Hancock County

- Blount Property, Highway 603, Rooney-Shoreline Park, Sweetbay Hollow, Tate Property, Whitney Property

Harrison County

- Blue Skies, Cedar Lake Island, East Taylor Road, Fay Browne Property, Hairston, Henderson Point, The Enchanted Nature Trail at Henderson Point, Johnson Property, Little Biloxi River Mitigation Bank, Potoman Property, Tchoutacabouffa Nature Park, Turkey Creek Greenway, Wessler Property, Wolf River, Wooten

Jackson County

- Antioch Road, Bay Sweep, Bennett Bayou, Black Creek Swamp, Branch Property, Butera Property, CCC Camp, Dismuke Property, Grafe, Halstead Road, Hannesson, Hearn, Hellmer's Lane, Highway 57, Hurley Property, Hussey, Johnson/Adcock Property, Linwood Grierson Nature Preserve, Mavar Property, McCool, Oswald, Pfeiffer, Pitcher Plant Bog, Sunset Avenue, Twelve Oaks, and Braemar property.

Pearl River County

- Morton Conservation Easement, Perry, Shaw Property, Wildwood Subdivision

Stone County

- Woodcock

== See also ==
- Mississippi Gulf Coast
- Gulf Coast of the United States
