= Joseph Hilliard Cain Sr. =

American military officer and politician

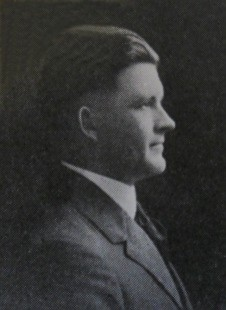
- Joseph Hilliard Cain Sr., State Representative in the Mississippi Legislature, 1920-24
- Born: March 25, 1892; Ramsey Springs, Mississippi, U.S.
- Died: April 22, 1962 (aged 70); Wiggins, Mississippi, U.S.
- Occupations: U.S. military officer, Mississippi legislator, educator, and preacher

Joseph Hilliard Cain Sr. (March 25, 1892 − April 22, 1962) was an American military officer, a member of the Mississippi State Legislature, a licensed preacher and Mississippi educator.

== Early years ==
Joseph Hilliard Cain was born in the Ramsey Springs community of Harrison County, Mississippi (now part of Stone County) on March 25, 1892, and was the sixth child of Thomas Wistar Cain and Miranda Whittington Cain. At age 20, he was licensed to preach in the Methodist Episcopal Church South.

In 1913, he completed his secondary education at Daisy-Vestry High School. In 1915, Cain enrolled in Mississippi Normal College where he studied for two years.

== Military service ==
When the United States entered World War I in 1917, Cain enlisted in Troop D, First Mississippi Cavalry on June 29, and served as a corporal and sergeant. He was stationed at Camp Beauregard in Louisiana.

On August 4, 1917, while in military service, Joseph Cain married Hilda Martin of Moss Point, Mississippi. Joseph and Hilda would become the parents of six children.

In July 1918, Cain was commissioned a second lieutenant in Field Remount Squadron 337 of the Quartermaster Corps, serving at Camp Johnston, Florida. The war ended before Cain's unit was sent overseas, and he was honorably discharged on December 18, 1918, at Camp Stuart, Virginia.

After World War I, Cain served as a deputy sheriff in Jackson County, Mississippi.

== Mississippi legislator ==
In 1919, Cain was elected to the House of Representative in the Mississippi State Legislature and served Jackson County for four years (1920–24). Cain was a member of the House Standing Committees on Education, Railroads, Census and Apportionment, Fees and Salaries, Commerce and Shipping, and Fisheries.

== Educator ==
In 1915, Cain first received a license to teach in Mississippi public schools. He taught in Jackson, George, and Stone Counties. He also served as principal in the Leakesville school and in the Powers School of Stone County.

In 1924, Cain was reauthorized to teach in Mississippi public schools. On occasion, he officiated as preacher at Pine Grove Methodist Church in Jackson County.

== Civilian Conservation Corps ==
From 1927 to 1933, Cain worked with the Mississippi State Forest Service (now Mississippi Forestry Commission). In 1933, he leased 16 acres (6.5 ha) of his land in the Ramsey Springs community to the Civilian Conservation Corps for use as Camp F-16 (Unit 1484), which opened on June 21, 1935. Cain was a Project Superintendent for Stone County CCC Camp P-51 (Unit 1486), from 1933 until it closed. In 1942, the CCC program was disbanded nationwide as many enrollees entered military service following the attack on Pearl Harbor.

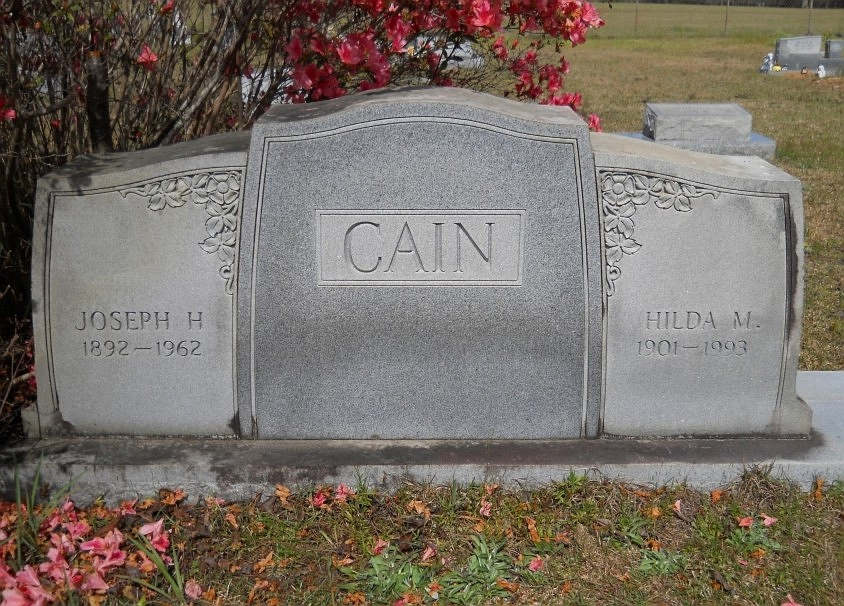
^{Headstone}

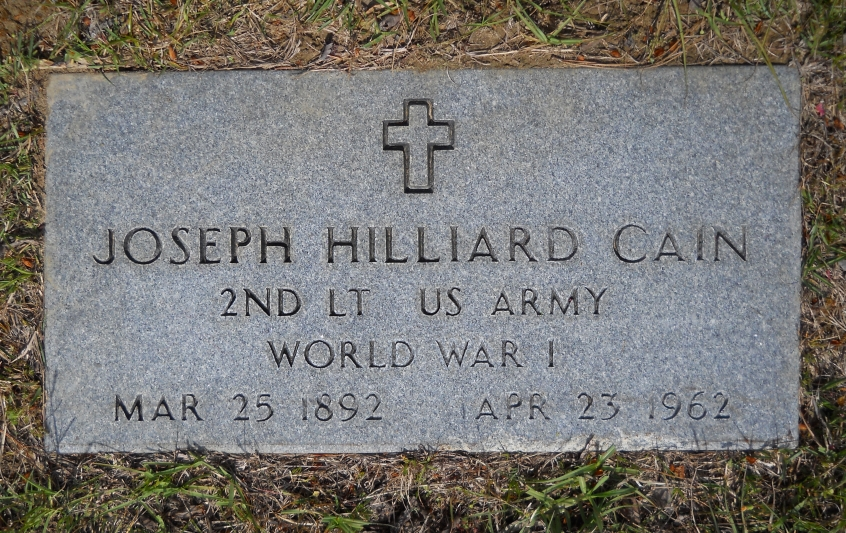
^{Footstone}

Joseph Hilliard Cain Sr. gravesite within Hunt-Whittington Cemetery, Stone County, Mississippi

== Later years ==
During World War II, Cain worked as a shipfitter at Ingalls Shipbuilding Corporation in Pascagoula, Mississippi. After World War II, he was an employee of the Veterans Administration Hospital in Gulfport, Mississippi.

Joseph Hilliard Cain Sr. died in 1962 and is buried in Hunt-Whittington Cemetery, in Stone County, Mississippi.
