= St James' Pit =

Protected area in Norwich, England

- Site of Special Scientific Interest
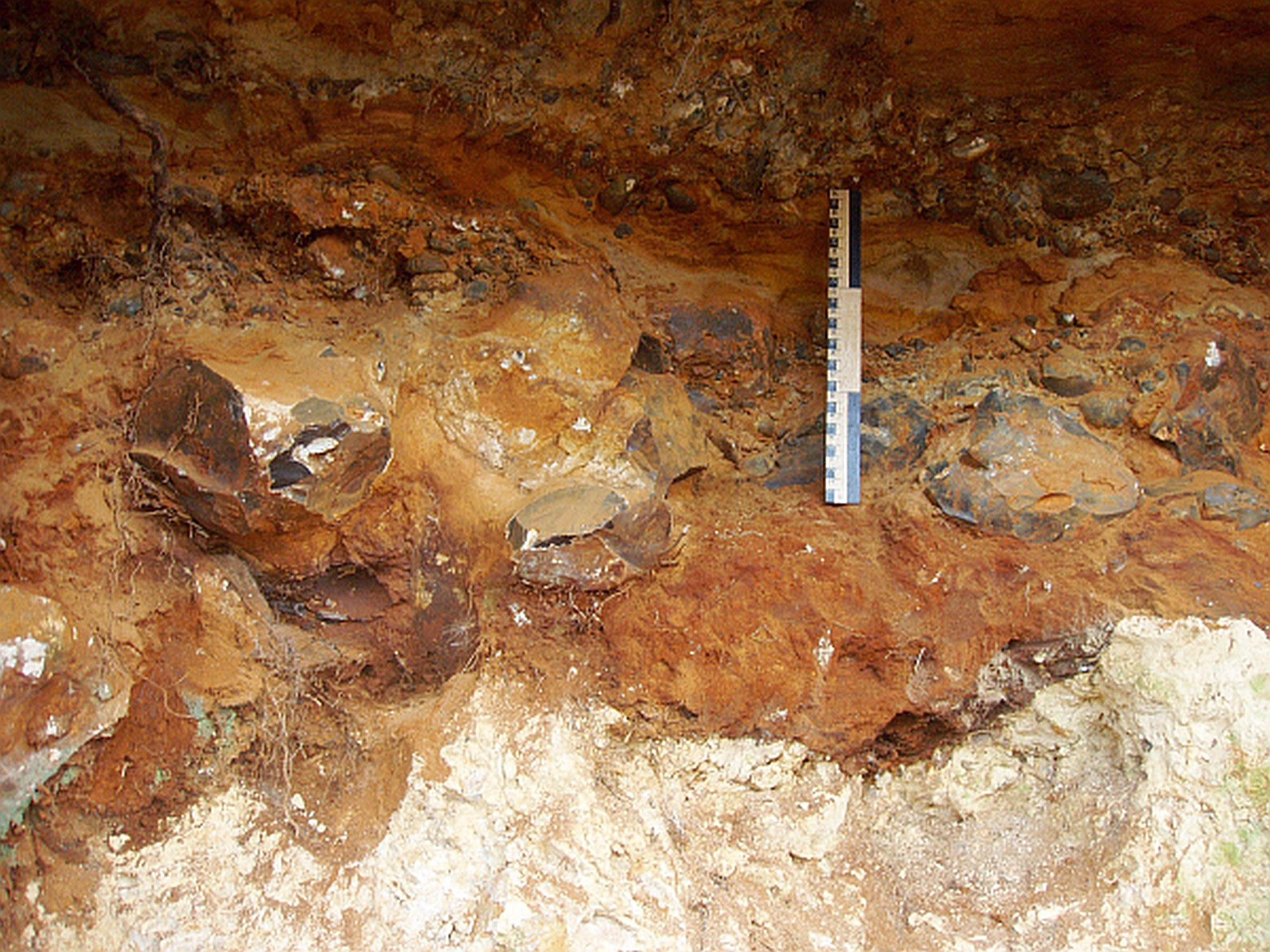
- Norwich Crag basement bed at St James' Pit

- Location within Norfolk
- Location of St James' Pit.
- Area of search: Norfolk
- Grid reference: TG241094
- Coordinates: 52.63555°N 1.31038°E
- Interest: Geological
- Area: 3.5 hectares (8.6 acres)
- Notification date: 1995

St James' Pit is a 3.5-hectare (8.6-acre) geological Site of Special Scientific Interest in Norwich in Norfolk, England. It is a Geological Conservation Review site within Mousehold Heath, which is a Local Nature Reserve.

This site has been designated because of its jaw and vertebra fossils of Liodon and Mosasaurus, which were two genera of mosasaurs, large marine reptiles dating to the Upper Cretaceous (Campanian-Maastrichtian).

== Land ownership ==
All land within St James' Pit SSSI is owned by the local authority.
