= Ramsey Springs, Mississippi =

- Unincorporated community
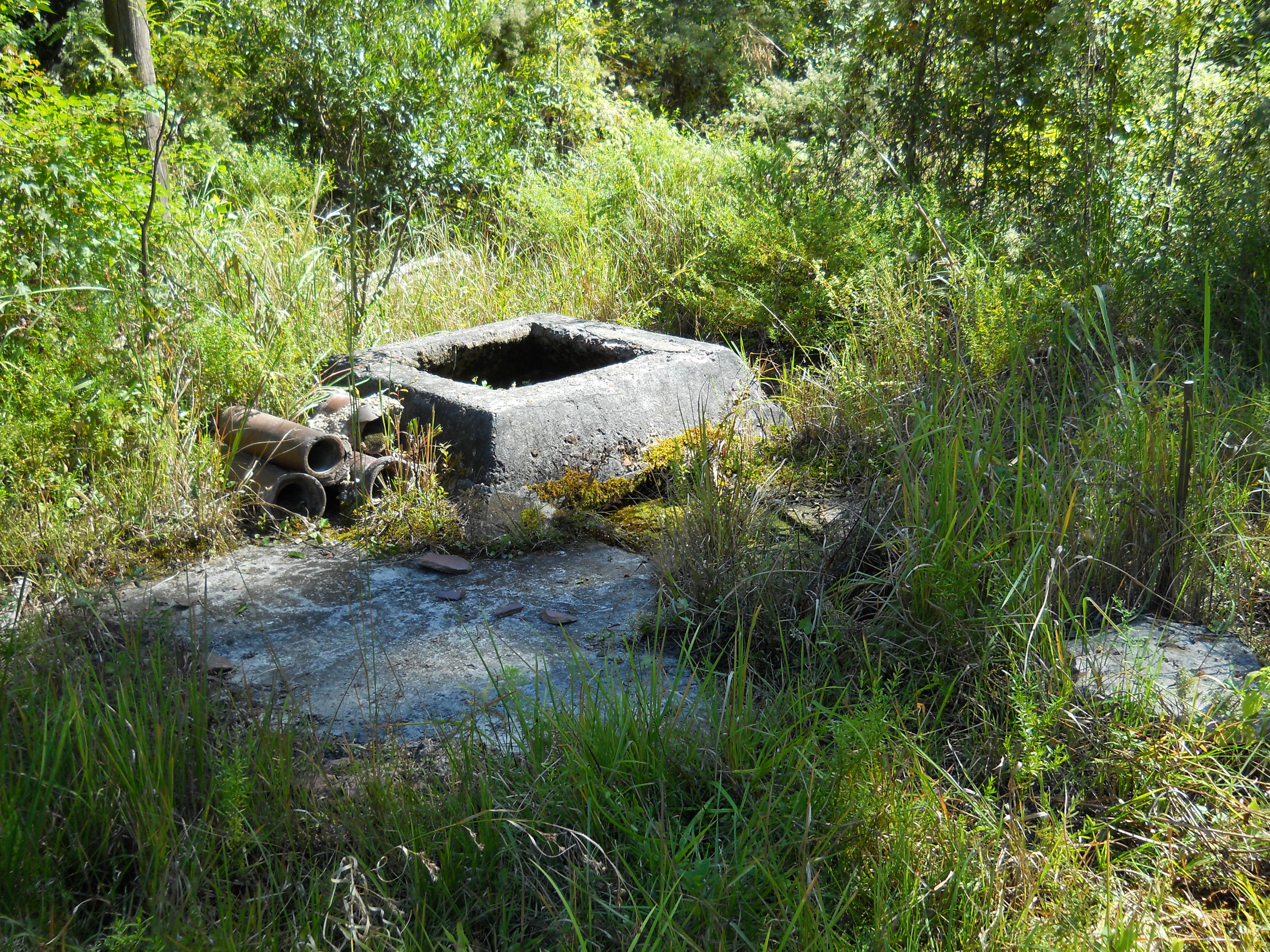
- Remnant structure over the artesian spring, Ramsey Springs, Mississippi, 2010

- Location within Mississippi Location within the United States
- Coordinates: 30°46′15″N 88°54′53″W
- Country: United States
- State: Mississippi
- County: Stone
- Elevation: 79 ft (24 m)
- Time zone: UTC-6 (Central (CST))
  - Summer (DST): UTC-5 (CDT)
- ZIP code: 39573
- Area code: Area code 601
- GNIS feature ID: 694509

Ramsey Springs is an unincorporated community in Stone County, Mississippi, United States. It is part of the Gulfport–Biloxi, Mississippi Metropolitan Statistical Area.

== History ==
The Ramsey Springs Community is located approximately 20 miles (32 kilometers) southeast of the City of Wiggins in Stone County, (formerly Harrison County) Mississippi, and dates back to the days of Native Americans. The Reverend Abner Walker and his brother George were directed to the artesian springs situated on the banks of Red Creek a tributary of the Pascagoula River. Red Creek watershed covers over 400 square miles (1036 square kilometers) in south Mississippi; the creek derives its name from the reddish stain of naturally occurring tannins that are carried in the water.

George Walker was suffering from a stomach ailment which the Native Americans said could be cured if he drank the mineral spring water. Walker began using the water and found that it relieved his stomach pain. Impressed with the water's curative powers, the Walkers told others about the spring, located on the A.C. Ramsey farm. In 1820, Ramsey had moved to the area and cleared land on a bluff along Red Creek. As early as 1896, a newspaper advertisement referenced a boarding house on the property. Soon, people arrived by the hundreds to camp near the natural spring and use the water for drinking and bathing.

Andrew Ramsey, an heir to the property, and A. Baldwin developed the spring and later sold out to Dr. George McHenry and George Bustin, who promoted the spring water as a cure for stomach ulcers and skin diseases. An analysis of the spring water, made by the National Bureau of Standards, listed eight chemicals, plus a small amount of radium. In the 1890s, a pamphlet advertised the advantages of Ramsey Mineral Springs water. The water was publicized for treating skin disorders, blood and bowel diseases, and liver and kidney complaints.

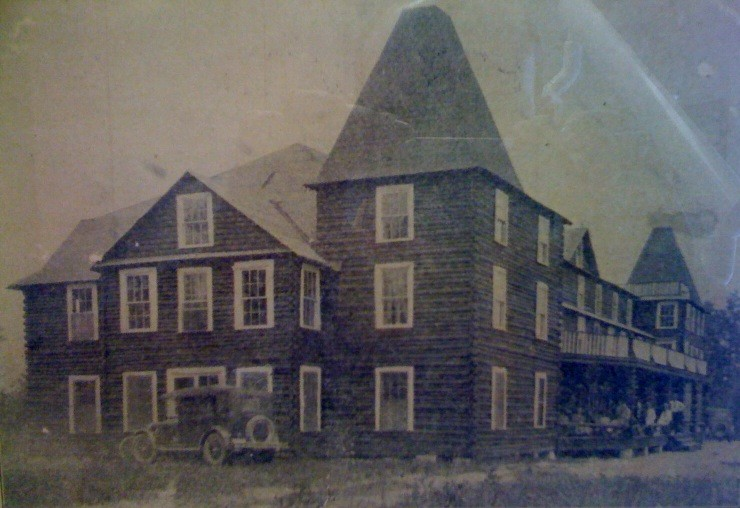
Ramsey Springs Hotel, circa 1920.

Through the years, ownership of the property changed hands, and around 1920, a hotel was constructed by the Miller family. The 25- to 35-room hotel was situated about one-quarter mile (0.4 kilometer) from the spring and Red Creek. As word spread, more and more visitors came to Ramsey Springs for its resort atmosphere. Guests relaxed and enjoyed home-cooked dinners and other accommodations in the rustic hotel. The hotel's interior was decorated with curious timbers, pine cones, and taxidermy specimens from the local forest. The huge lobby had a large, cobblestone fireplace and a ceiling of cypress logs that supported the upper floors. On the grounds of the hotel was a swimming pool that contained clear, cold water from the natural spring. During the first half of the 20th century, Ramsey Springs Hotel was booked solid by Mississippi Gulf Coast residents as a weekend and vacation retreat. Interest in Ramsey Springs Hotel waned after World War II, because the Mississippi Gulf Coast, from Gulfport to Biloxi, experienced development of motels and hotels and construction of a sandy beach-front along the shore of the Gulf of Mexico, which was paralleled by U.S. Highway 90.

In 1961, the Ramsey Springs Hotel was demolished. Fifty years later, the Land Trust for the Mississippi Coastal Plain acquired 57 acres (23 hectares) of the Ramsey homestead property and conveyed it to the State of Mississippi with an understanding that the property would be dedicated to conservation and managed for public-use because of its ecological, cultural, and scenic significance.

== Civilian Conservation Corps ==
On June 21, 1935, CCC Camp F-16 opened in the Ramsey Springs Community. The camp was located on property owned by Joseph Hilliard Cain, Sr., which he leased to the Civilian Conservation Corps for $75. By 1942, the CCC program was disbanded nationwide as many enrollees entered military service following the attack on Pearl Harbor.

== Education ==
- The Ramsey Springs community is served by the Stone County School District.

== Transportation ==
- The Ramsey Springs community is served by Mississippi Highway 15.

== Gallery ==
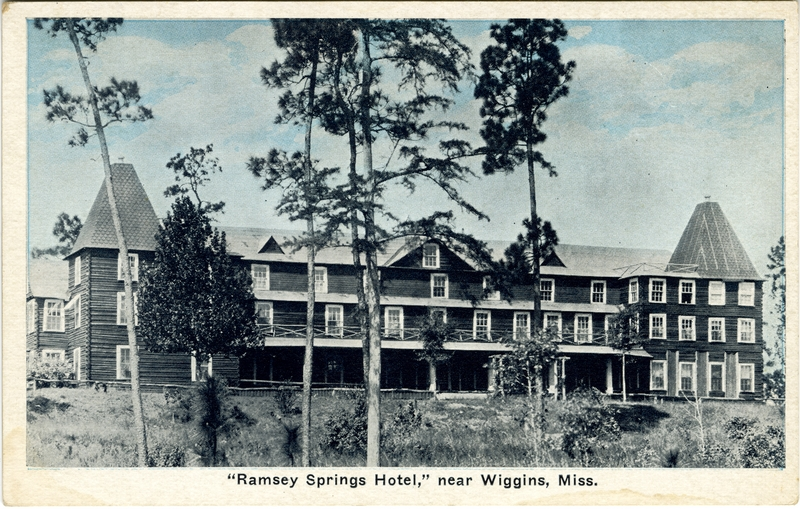
Ramsey Springs Hotel, circa 1930.

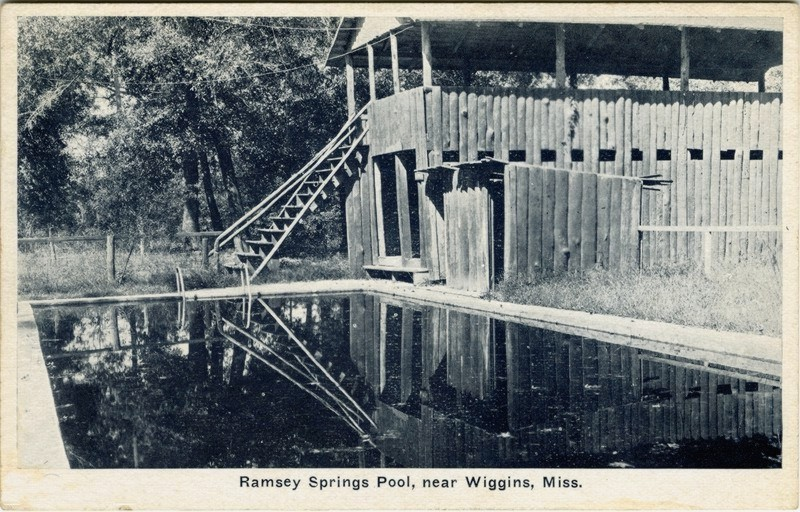
Ramsey Springs Hotel Pool, circa 1930.

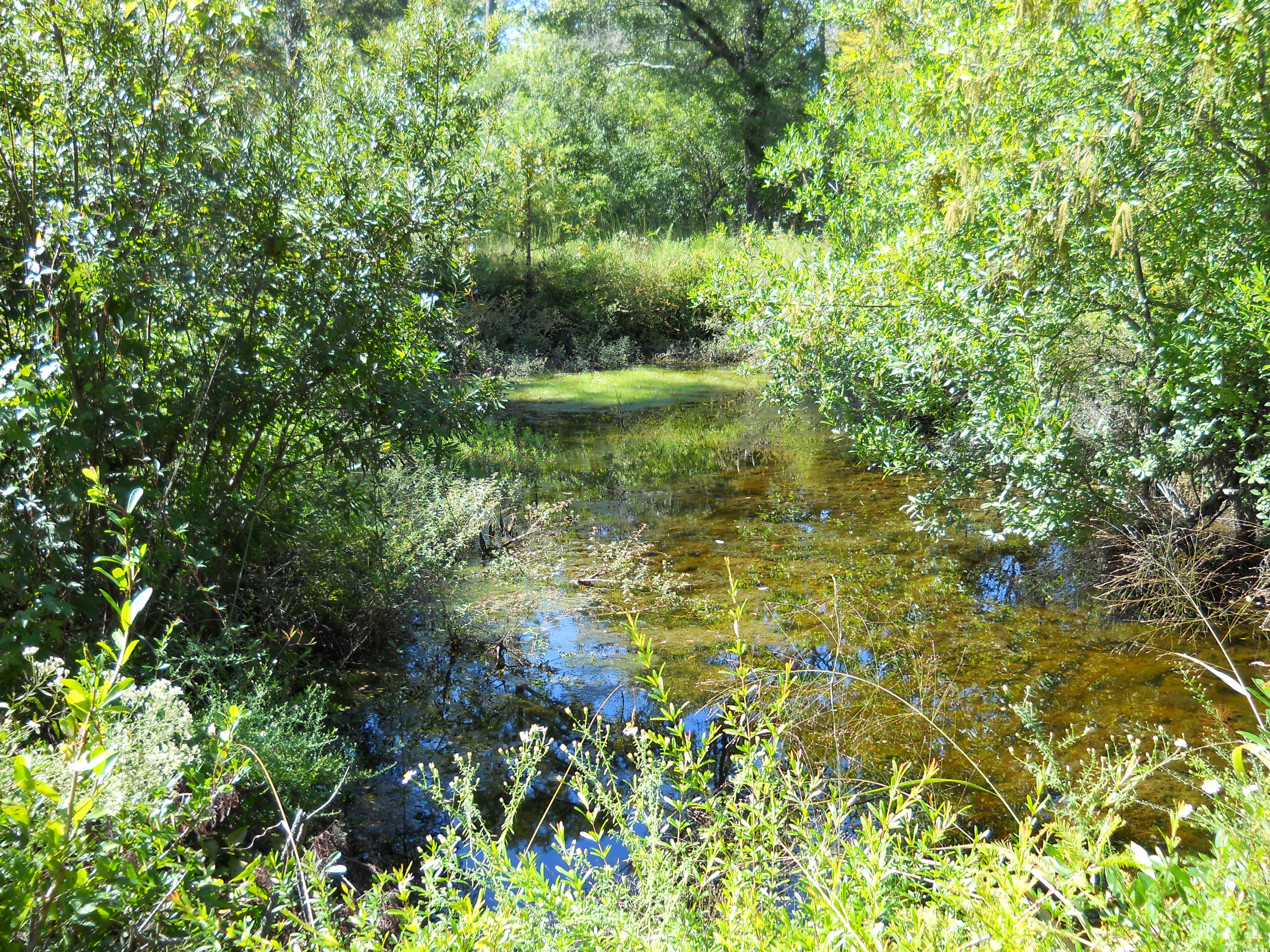
Remnant of Ramsey Springs Hotel Pool, 2010.

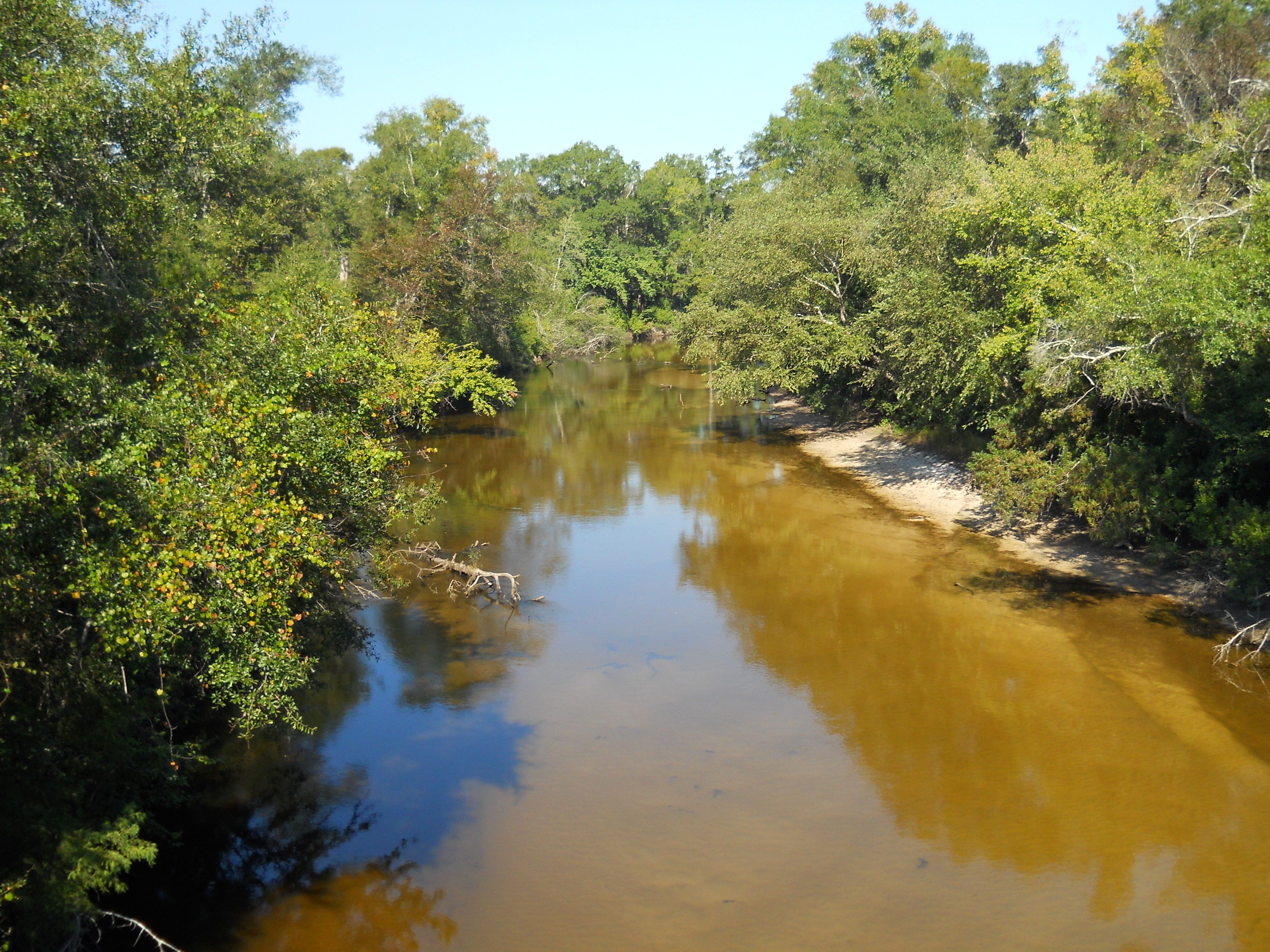
Red Creek, as viewed looking west from MS Highway 15 bridge, 2010.

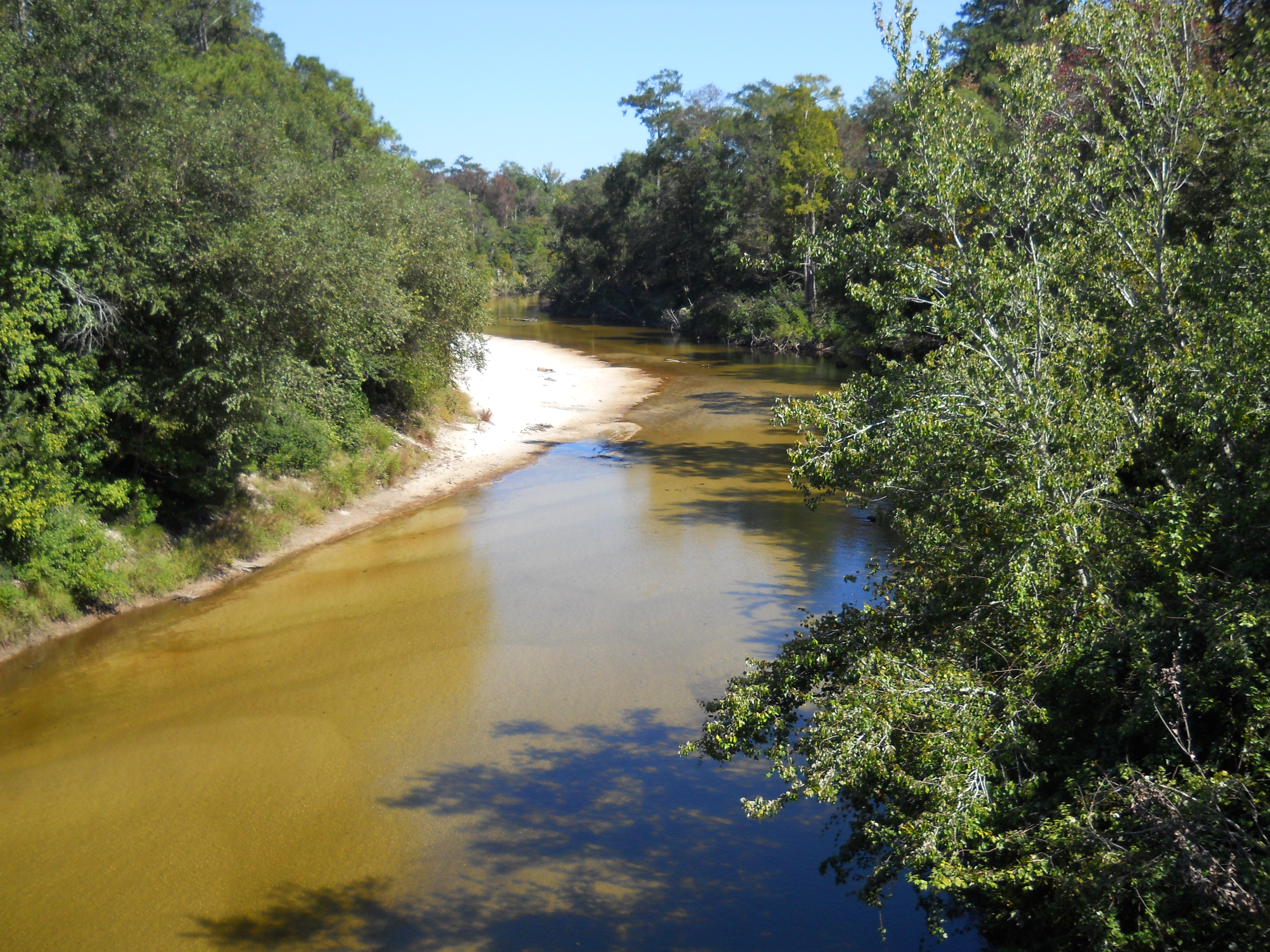
Red Creek, as viewed looking east from MS Highway 15 bridge, 2010.
