= Conservation management system =

A conservation management system (CMS) is a procedure for maintaining a species or habitat in a particular state. It is a means whereby humankind secures wildlife in a favourable condition for contemplation, education or research, in perpetuity. It is an important topic in cultural ecology, where conservation management counterbalances the unchecked exploitative management of natural resources. Conservation management systems are vital for turning sustainable development strategies into successful operations.

In New Zealand the Department of Conservation develops conservation management strategies in conjunction with the community as a means of prioritising conservation issues.

Conservation management has historically adopted ideals deriving from 3 discursive approaches: the classic approach, populist approach, and neoliberal approach. All three approaches have differing ideas about the nexus of conservation and development and their potential interactions.

- The Classic Approach understands local people to be a threat to environmental conservation and therefore people occupying landed intended for conservation have historically and presently been evicted from their land.
- The Populist Approach understands that conservation requires the participation and the empowerment of local people in order to reach both social and environmental aims.
- The Neoliberal Approach sees the need for value to be placed on biodiversity in order for conservation to be incorporated in the economic systems and be successful as a tool of economic development.

National Parks are heavily managed conservation areas. The approach adopted by a conservation authority will influence the management of a Park and dictate how the park authorities view the role of the park and the relationship visitors may have with it. An example of a park adopting a populist approach is the Rouge National Urban Park located in Canada’s largest city Toronto. Though controlled by the Government of Canada through Parks Canada, the Rouge National Urban Park encourages the community to access the park to learn, play and live. The complexity of the Park being in a large metropolitan city has meant that Parks Canada has incorporated the surrounding communities into the planning, implementation, and management of the park.

== Conservation Management Systems in Practice ==
Poorly managed or incorrectly manage conservation practices can have consequences beyond what is initially expected while successful plans can make positive change. One example of unintended consequences of the Classic approach is the spread of organized crime in the Mexican Oyamel forest. The land was made part of UNESCO's Monarch Butterfly Biosphere Reserve Program and had the intention of protecting the migratory habitat of the monarch butterfly. Locals were pushed out to protect the habitat as part of the classic management approach. However, local crime organizations have now taken up residence and there have been numerous deaths and 'disappearances' in the area An example of a plan that made positive change was that of the use of technoscience to create American chestnut trees that were resistant to blight. Through crosses and manipulations, a lab at SUNY-ESF was able to create a blight resistant strain of hybrid American chestnut trees. In order to prevent privatization and patenting from limiting the access of conservation endeavors from using this strain, the lab chose to forego such neoliberal practices. This has led to positive impact in the conservation endeavors for the American chestnut tree but has also opened up the door to further biotechnological advances and possible commodification of related strains.

== See also ==
- Conservation management system (United Kingdom)
- Conservation ethic
- Conservation biology
- Environmental management
